= BMW X3 =

Compact luxury crossover SUV

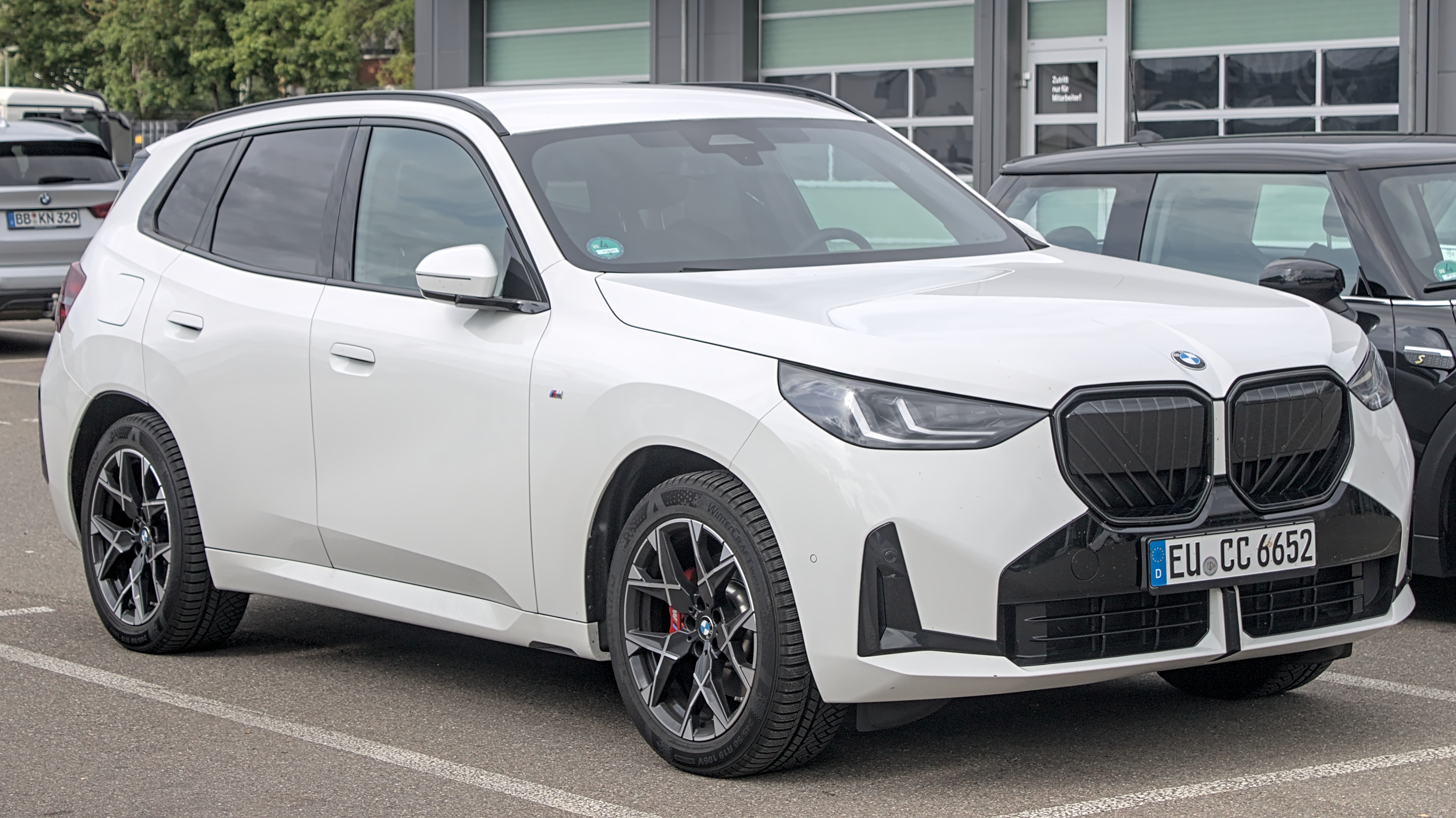
- BMW X3 (G45)

Overview
- Manufacturer: BMW
- Production: 2003–present

Body and chassis
- Class: Compact luxury crossover SUV (D)
- Body style: 5-door SUV

The BMW X3 is a compact luxury crossover SUV manufactured by BMW since 2003, based on the BMW 3 Series platform. BMW markets the car as a Sports Activity Vehicle, the company's proprietary descriptor for its X-line luxury vehicles.

The first-generation X3 E83 in 2003 was designed by BMW in conjunction with Magna Steyr of Graz, Austria—who also manufactured all X3s under contract to BMW. The BMW X3 (2003) was the first BMW model to officially introduce the xDrive system under this name. The car was the first mid-size, premium SUV on the market. In 2008, BMW started competing with the Mercedes-Benz GLK-Class (renamed GLC-Class since 2016), and numerous other SUVs in this segment.

BMW manufactured the second-generation X3 F25 in 2010 at their Spartanburg plant in South Carolina, USA.

Starting with the third generation G01 in 2017, BMW South Africa's Rosslyn plant began production of the X3, alongside the Spartanburg plant, after the facility underwent a major upgrade to prepare for the X3 production, replacing the long-running 3 Series production in the plant. The battery electric model was sold as the BMW iX3. In 2019 the first BMW X3 M (F97) version fitted with a 3.0 L S58 was produced.

The fourth-generation X3 G45 went into the production in 2024.

The X3 is smaller than the X5 and X6, and bigger than the X1 and the X2.

- 1st Generation: E83 (2003–2010)
- 2nd Generation: F25 (2011–2017)
- 3rd Generation: G01/F97 (2017–2024)
- 4th Generation: G45 (2024–Present)

== First generation (E83; 2003) ==
First generation
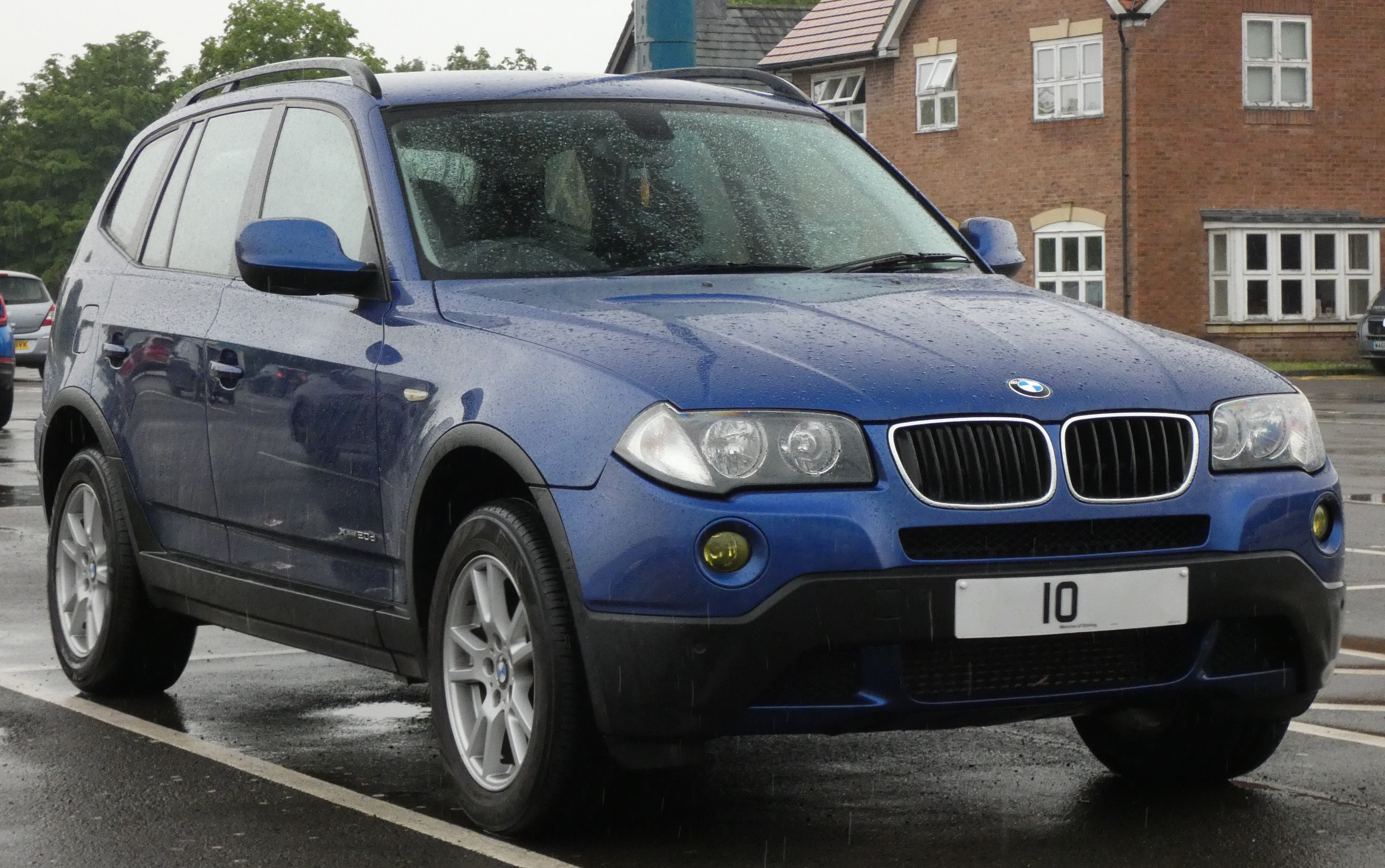

Overview
- Model code: E83
- Production: August 2003 – August 2010
- Model years: 2004–2010
- Assembly: Austria: Graz (Magna Steyr); Thailand: Rayong (BMW Thailand); Egypt: 6th of October City (BAG); Russia: Kaliningrad (Avtotor)
- Designer: Pascal Tanghe, Geoff Velasco

Body and chassis
- Layout: Longitudinally mounted, front engine, four-wheel drive
- Related: BMW 3 Series (E46)

Powertrain
- Engine: Petrol: 2.0 L N46 I4; 2.5 L M54 / N52 I6; 3.0 L M54 / N52 I6; Diesel: 2.0 L M47 / N47 I4; 3.0 L M57 I6
- Transmission: 6-speed automatic and manual

Dimensions
- Wheelbase: 2,795 mm (110.0 in)
- Length: 4,564–4,570 mm (179.7–179.9 in)
- Width: 1,855 mm (73.0 in)
- Height: 1,673–1,675 mm (65.9–65.9 in)

The first-generation BMW X3, internally designated as the E83, was produced from 2003 to 2010 and based on the BMW 3 Series platform. The E83 was designed by BMW in conjunction with Magna Steyr of Graz, Austria who also manufactured all first-generation X3s under contract to BMW.

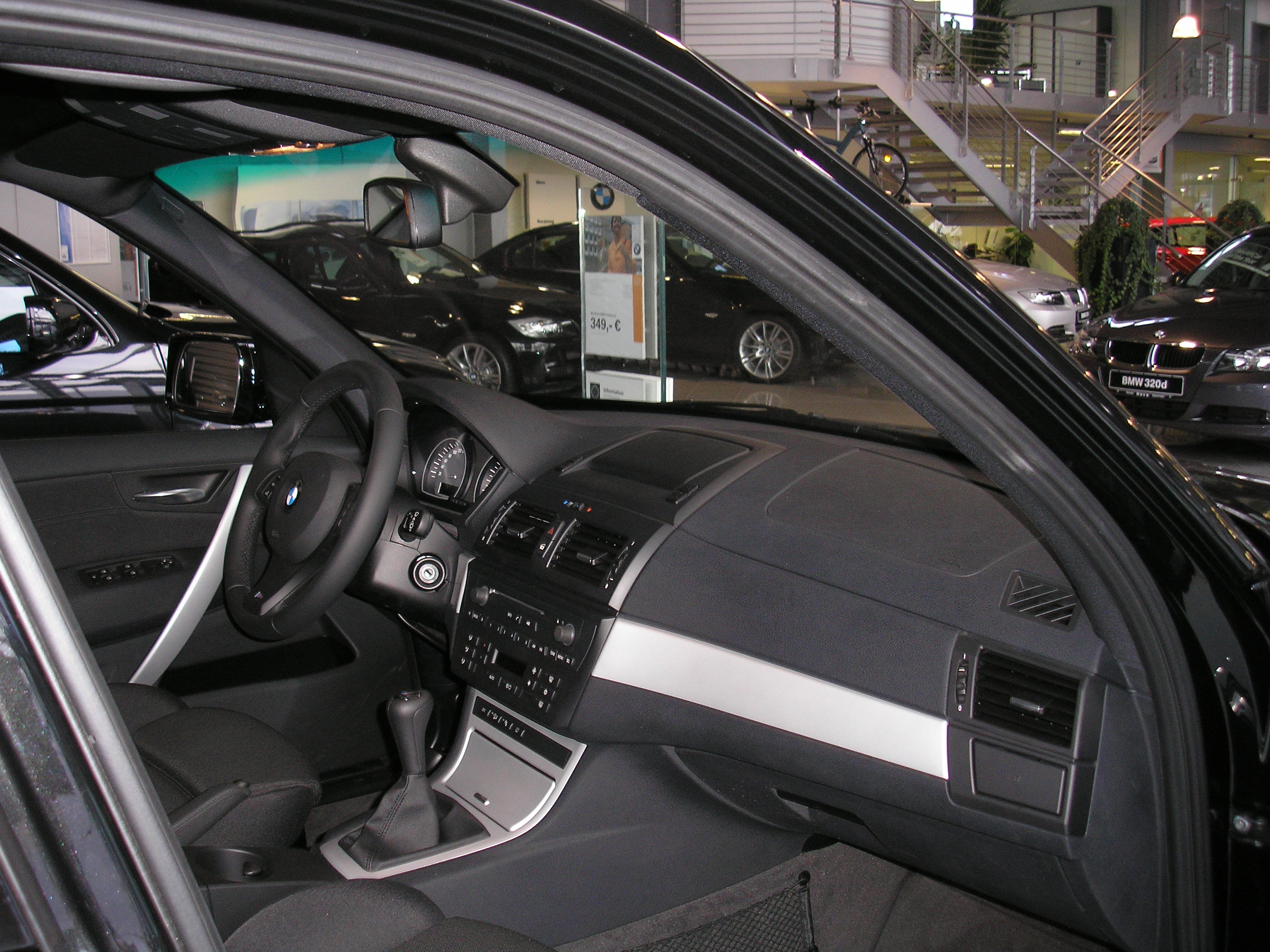
Interior

As a precursor to the X3, in 2003 BMW presented the xActivity concept vehicle at the Detroit Auto Show featuring the 3 Series platform and a fixed-profile convertible body style with reinforced longitudinal rails connecting the A-pillars to the rear of the car on both sides, eliminating B- or C-pillars.

The X3 premiered in September 2003 at the Frankfurt Auto Show (Internationale Automobil-Ausstellung), sharing its rear suspension with the E46 330xi and using an automatic four-wheel drive system marketed as xDrive. All X3 models feature BMW's all-wheel drive system, with a default 40:60 torque split between the front and rear axles. The system used an electronically controlled multiple-plate clutch to enable infinitely adjustable, fully variable distribution of torque from rear to front axle with the capability of up to 50 per cent of engine torque going to the front. This is because the rear-biased AWD system X-drive delivers direct drive to the rear axle from the transmission, but the front axle only receives input through the infinitely-variable transfer case clutch "as needed". This makes X-drive particularly durable for acceleration and towing, as the weight shifts rearward during climbing onto the un-clutched directly-driven rear axle. Finally, advanced traction control allows both axles to behave as electro-hydraulically-controlled limited slip differentials employed "as needed" to achieve ultimate traction by synchronizing torque to left and right tires irrespective of grip and resulting in effortless acceleration on any surface. BMW markets the crossover as a Sports Activity Vehicle, the company's descriptor for its X-line of vehicles.

The X3 was conceived to combine the agility of a compact model with the driving experience of the company's X5. The X3 featured an upright, high H-point seating configuration, marketed as "command seating". Styling exhibited interacting concave and convex surfacing, characteristic for the company at the time along with a reinterpreted Hofmeister kink.

BMW upgraded the model in 2005 and facelifted the model in 2007, with revised body bumpers, engine, interior trim, and suspension.

The X3 3.0i won the Canadian Car of the Year Best Sports Utility Vehicle award for 2005. The X3 was initially criticised for its harsh ride, austere interior, lack of off-road capability and high price.

U.S-spec X3 models were well-equipped, with standard equipment such as: the BMW Business A/M-F/M-CD radio (with optional dealer-activated Bluetooth functionality for wireless phones), an eight-speaker premium audio system, leatherette-trimmed seating surfaces, dual power front bucket seats, aluminium interior trim accents, keyless entry, and seventeen-inch (17") aluminium-alloy wheels. Optional equipment included a ten-speaker premium audio system with Digital Sound Processing (DSP), Sirius Satellite Radio, a dashboard-mounted colour GPS navigational system that replaced the upper dashboard storage compartment and contained a modified version of BMW's "iDrive" multimedia system, eighteen-inch (and later nineteen-inch) aluminium-alloy wheels, Nevada leather-trimmed seating surfaces, heated front and rear seats, a heated steering wheel, a security system, BMW Assist, a panoramic dual-pane moonroof, Xenon front headlamps with adaptive front headlamps, and sport front bucket seats.

=== 2003–2006 ===
- Bluetooth could actually be ordered straight from the factory (part of the Premium Package) and functioned without dealer intervention. (Although the BMW X3 was originally offered and promised with Bluetooth support in 2004, none of the cars that shipped from the factory actually had it installed. Few were able to get it to work with servicing from their dealer.)
- The interior was upgraded with more consistent plastic panels. Also instead of having grey carpeting which was present on all 2004 X3s, the 2005 X3 came with carpeting that matched the leather ordered (with the exception of the Terracotta interior with black carpeting).
- Slightly softer suspension.
- Front fenders are one-piece, as opposed to the two-piece found on 2004 models.
- A 2.0d engine became available in 2005 for some markets – joining the 2.5i and 3.0i engines (found stateside) as well as the 3.0d engine sold elsewhere in the world.
- An 'Open-Door' indicator was added on the 2004 models.

=== 2006–2010 ===
For 2006, the U.S.-spec X3 lost its 2.5L M54 inline 6-cylinder engine for the 2.5i model. The only model available from 2006 onwards for the U.S.-spec X3 was the 3.0L M54 inline 6-cylinder engine (later, the N52 inline 6-cylinder engine) and the 3.0i model (later, 3.0Si or xDrive30i). This further increased the X3's base price.

In September 2006, the E83 received a facelift with revised headlights, grille, front bumper, tail lights, rear bumper, and interior.

For the 2007 model year, the US market X3 was powered by the N52 inline 6-cylinder engine that debuted on the 2006 E90 3 Series. Internationally, the X3 received smaller engines including the 4-cylinder petrol and diesel options. In Europe, the range started with a 2.0-litre 4-cylinder petrol, a 4cyl. turbo diesel and continues with 6-cylinder turbo & bi-turbo diesels. The largest diesel offered was the sport diesel with 210 kW (282 hp).

U.S. market 2006 X3s were equipped with a version of the 'M' technik body kit with unpainted door sills and wheel arches. U.S. spec Sport Package 2006 X3's received the full 'M' body kit (with painted front, side and rear plastic) available internationally as a factory accessory. 2.5i was removed for sale from the U.S. and Adaptive headlamps and a panoramic sunroof were made available, as well as upgraded dashboard components and leather seating.

Since September 2008, the Edition Exclusive and Edition lifestyle were available. The M-Sport Package was replaced in March 2009 by the Sport Limited Edition.

Pre-facelift styling

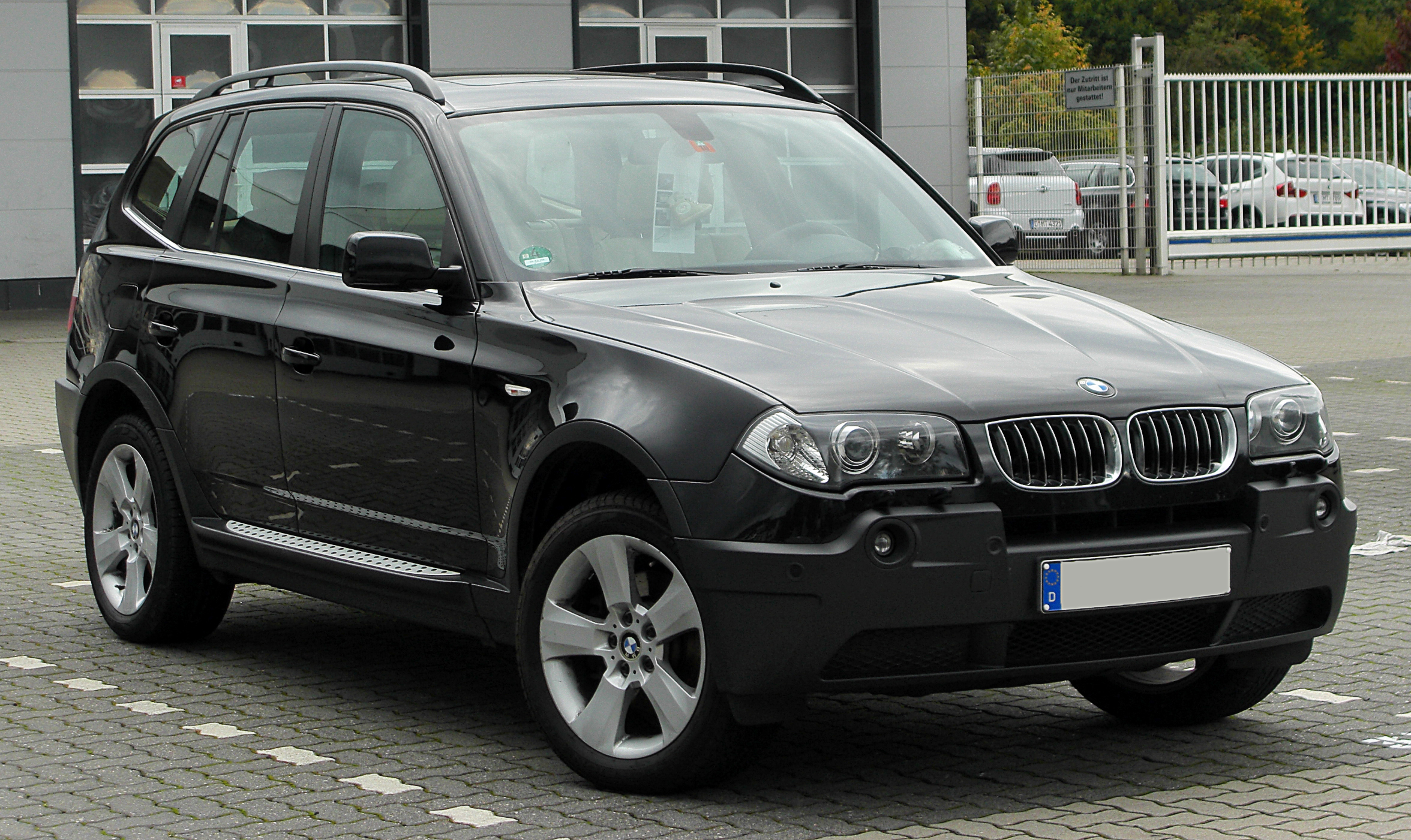
Front

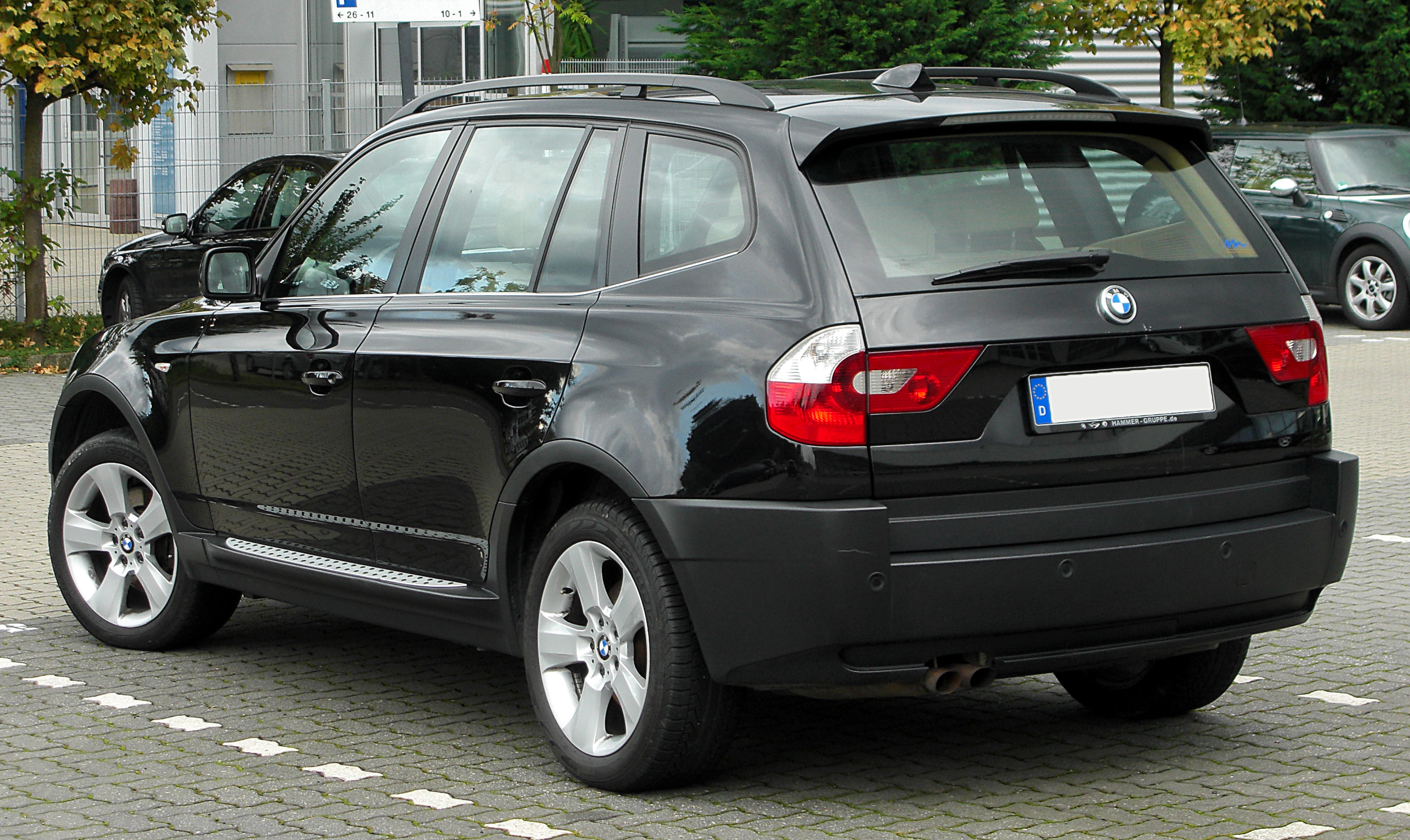
Rear

Post-facelift styling

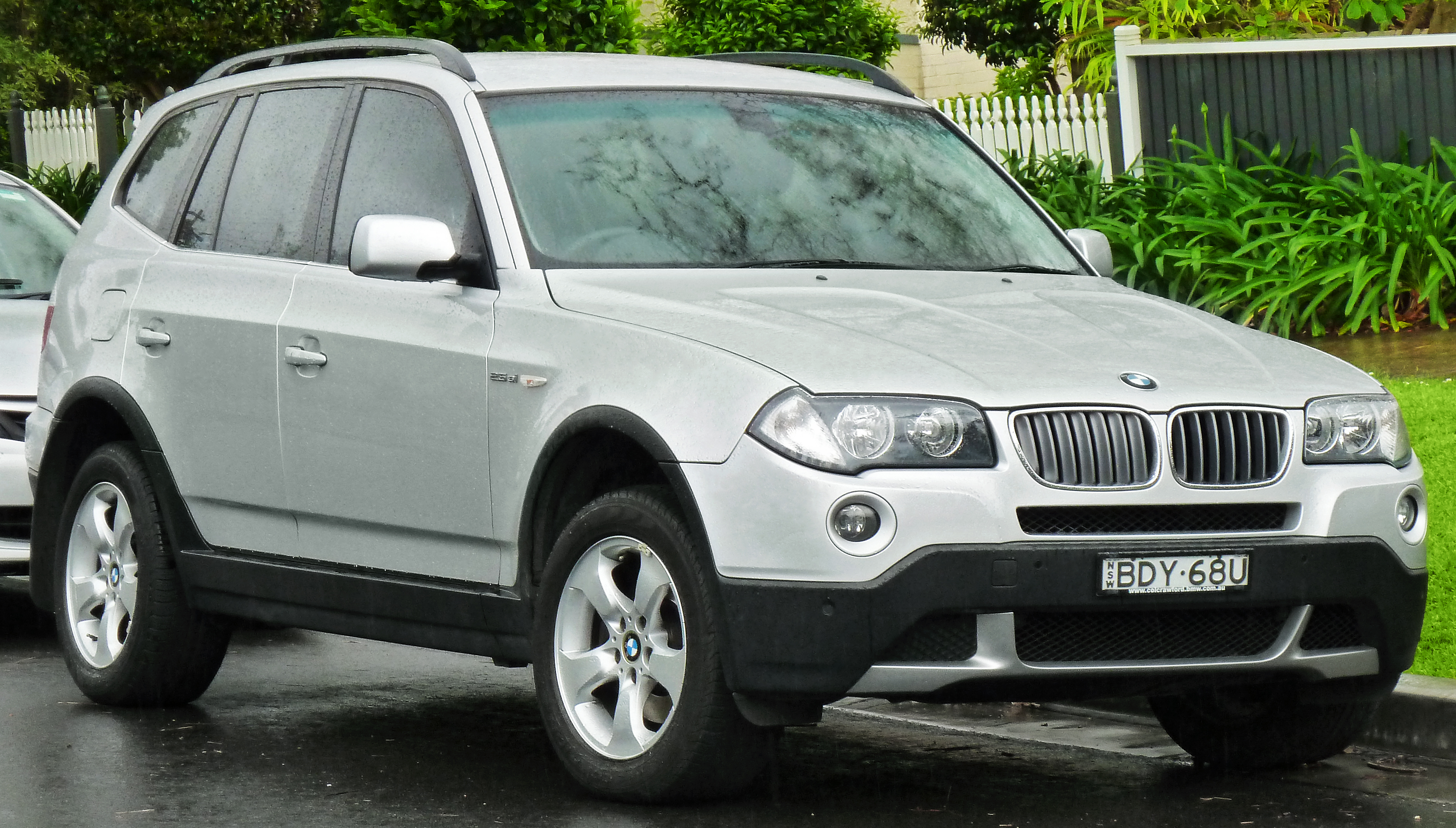
Front (2.5si)

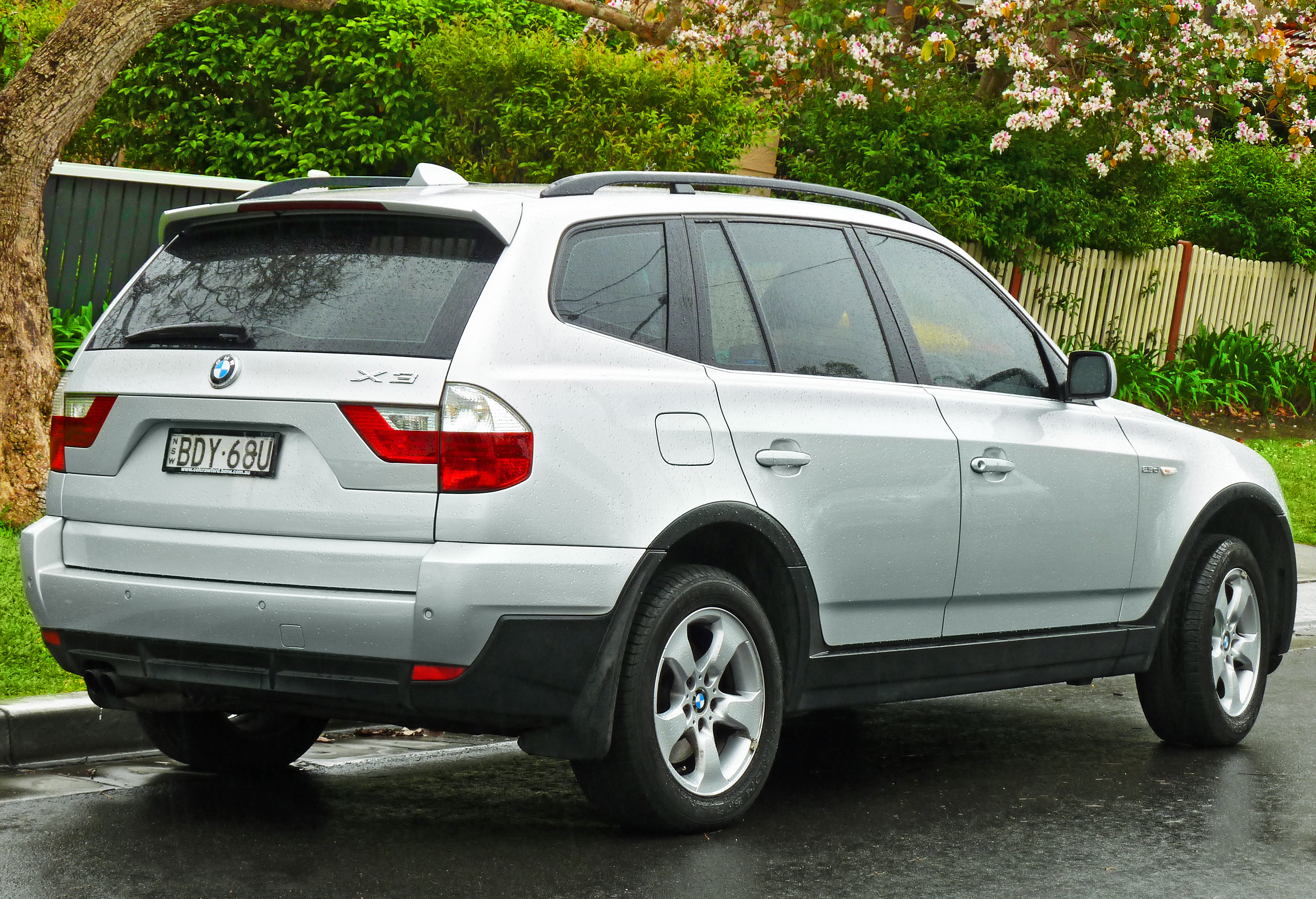
Rear (2.5si)

=== Engines ===
Petrol engines
Model	Years	Engine	Power	Torque	0–100 km/h (0–62 mph)	Top speed
2.0i, xDrive20i	2005–2010	2.0 L N46 straight-4	110 kW (150 PS; 148 hp) at 6200 rpm	200 N⋅m (148 lbf⋅ft) at 3750 rpm	11.5 s	198 km/h (123 mph)
2.5i	2004–2006	2.5 L M54 straight-6	141 kW (192 PS; 189 hp) at 6000 rpm	245 N⋅m (181 lb⋅ft) at 3500 rpm	MT: 8.9 s AT: 9.8 s	208 km/h (129 mph)
2.5si, xDrive25i	2006–2010	2.5 L N52 straight-6	160 kW (218 PS; 215 hp) at 6500 rpm	250 N⋅m (184 lbf⋅ft) at 2750–4250 rpm	MT: 8.5 s AT: 8.9 s	MT: 221 km/h (137 mph); AT: 220 km/h (137 mph)
3.0i	2004–2006	3.0 L M54 straight-6	170 kW (231 PS; 228 hp) at 5900 rpm	300 N⋅m (221 lbf⋅ft) at 3500 rpm	MT: 7.8 s AT: 8.1 s	MT: 224 km/h (139 mph); AT: 210 km/h (130 mph)
3.0si, xDrive30i	2006–2010	3.0 L N52 straight-6	200 kW (272 PS; 268 hp) at 6650 rpm	315 N⋅m (232 lb⋅ft) at 2750 rpm	MT: 7.2 s AT: 7.5 s	MT: 228 km/h (142 mph); AT: 232 km/h (144 mph)

Diesel engines
Model	Years	Engine- turbo	Power	Torque	0–100 km/h (0–62 mph)	Top speed
xDrive18d	2009–2010	2.0 L N47 straight-4	110 kW (150 PS; 148 hp) at 4000 rpm	350 N⋅m (258 lbf⋅ft) at 1750 rpm	10.3 s	195 km/h (121 mph)
2.0d, xDrive20d	2005–2007	2.0 L M47 straight-4	110 kW (150 PS; 148 hp) at 4000 rpm	330 N⋅m (243 lbf⋅ft) at 2000 rpm	10.2 s	198 km/h (123 mph)
2.0d, xDrive20d	2007–2010	2.0 L N47 straight-4	130 kW (177 PS; 174 hp) at 4000 rpm	350 N⋅m (258 lbf⋅ft) at 1750–3000 rpm	MT: 8.9 s AT: 9.2 s	MT: 206 km/h (128 mph); AT: 205 km/h (127 mph)
3.0d, xDrive30d	2003–2004	3.0 L M57 straight-6	150 kW (204 PS; 201 hp) at 4000 rpm	410 N⋅m (302 lbf⋅ft) at 1500–3250 rpm	MT: 7.9 s AT: 8.2 s	MT: 218 km/h (135 mph); AT: 215 km/h (134 mph)
3.0d, xDrive30d	2004–2010	3.0 L M57 straight-6	160 kW (218 PS; 215 hp) at 4000 rpm	500 N⋅m (369 lbf⋅ft) at 1750–2750 rpm	MT: 7.4 s AT: 7.7 s	210 km/h (130 mph)
3.0sd, xDrive35d	2006–2010	3.0 L M57 straight-6	210 kW (286 PS; 282 hp) at 4400 rpm	580 N⋅m (428 lbf⋅ft) at 1750–2250 rpm	6.4 s	240 km/h (149 mph)

=== Cross Country ===
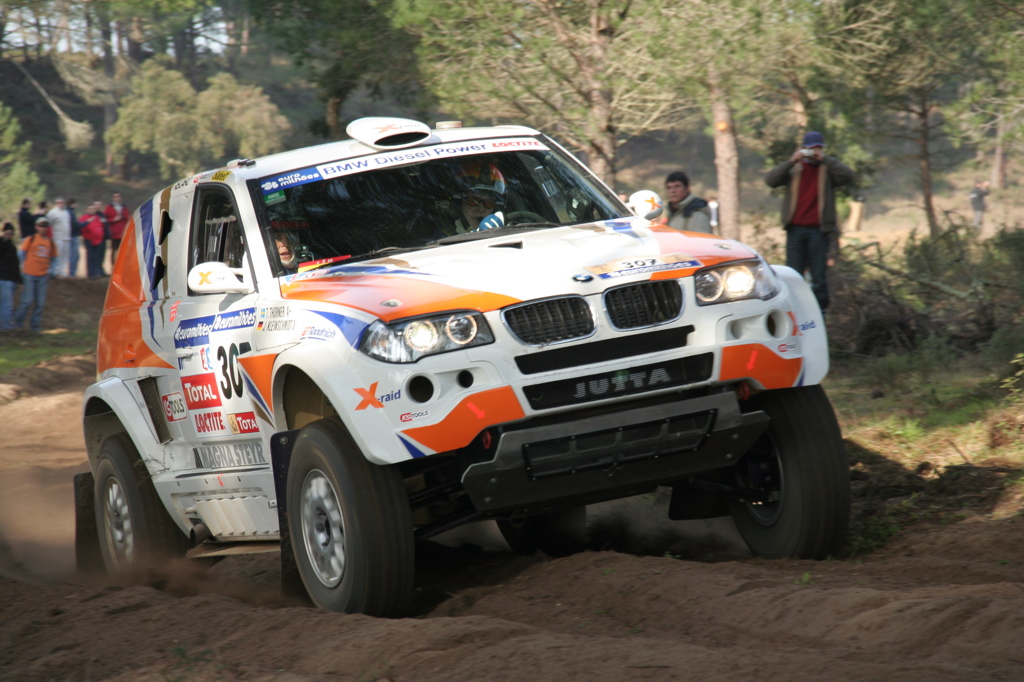
X3 CC in the 2007 Dakar Rally

The X3 Cross Country, also known as the X3 CC, is an X3 prepared for rally raid competition. It features a 2.9-litre inline-6 (debore and destroked M57TU2D30 engine from 3.0 litre to 2.9-litre), twin turbocharged diesel engine.

=== Safety ===
==== ANCAP ====
ANCAP test results* BMW X3 all variants (2008)
Test	Score
Overall	4 /5 stars
Frontal offset	11.77/16
Side impact	15/16
Pole	1/2
Seat belt reminders	0/3
Whiplash protection	Not Assessed
Pedestrian protection	Poor
Electronic stability control	Standard

==== Euro NCAP ====
Euro NCAP scores (2008 BMW X3)
Adult Occupant:	4/5 stars
Child Occupant:	4/5 stars
Pedestrian:	1/4 stars

==== IIHS ====
IIHS scores (2004 model year)
Moderate overlap front (original test)	Good
Head restraints and seats	Poor

== Second generation (F25; 2010) ==
Second generation
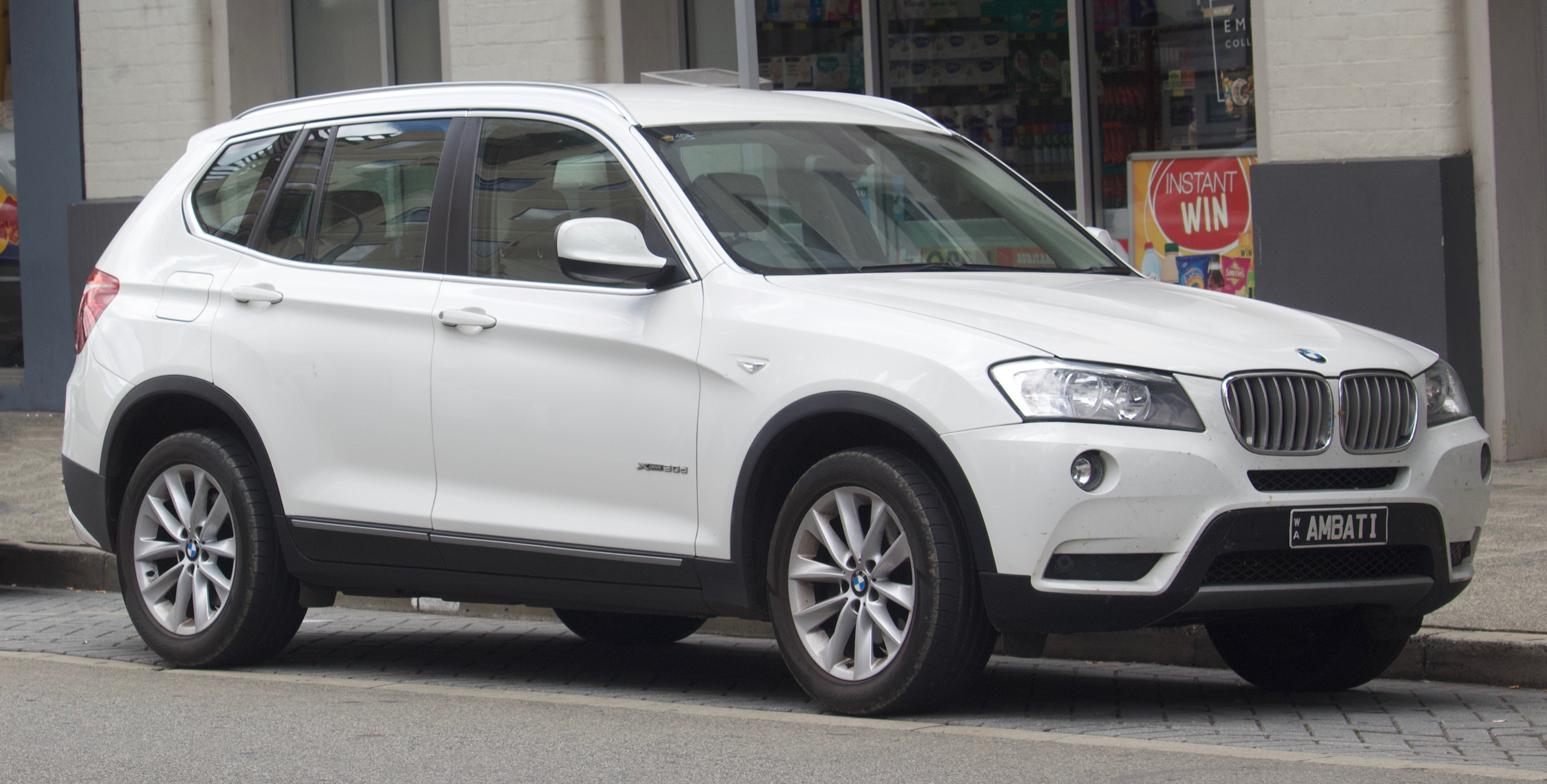

Overview
- Model code: F25
- Production: September 2010 – August 2017
- Model years: 2011–2017
- Assembly: United States: Greer, South Carolina (Plant Spartanburg); India: Chennai (BMW India); Thailand: Rayong (BMW Thailand); Malaysia: Kulim, Kedah (Inokom); Indonesia: Jakarta (Gaya Motor); Russia: Kaliningrad (Avtotor); Egypt: 6th of October City (BAG)
- Designer: Erik Goplen (2006)

Body and chassis
- Layout: Front-engine, rear-wheel-drive (sDrive); Front-engine, four-wheel-drive (xDrive)
- Platform: BMW L7
- Related: BMW X4 (F26)

Powertrain
- Engine: Petrol: 2.0 L N20 I4; 3.0 L N52 / N55 I6; Diesel: 2.0 L N47 / B47 I4; 3.0 L N57 I6
- Transmission: 6-speed manual; 8-speed ZF 8HP automatic

Dimensions
- Wheelbase: 2,810 mm (110.6 in)
- Length: 4,652 mm (183.1 in)
- Width: 1,884 mm (74.2 in)
- Height: 1,713 mm (67.4 in)

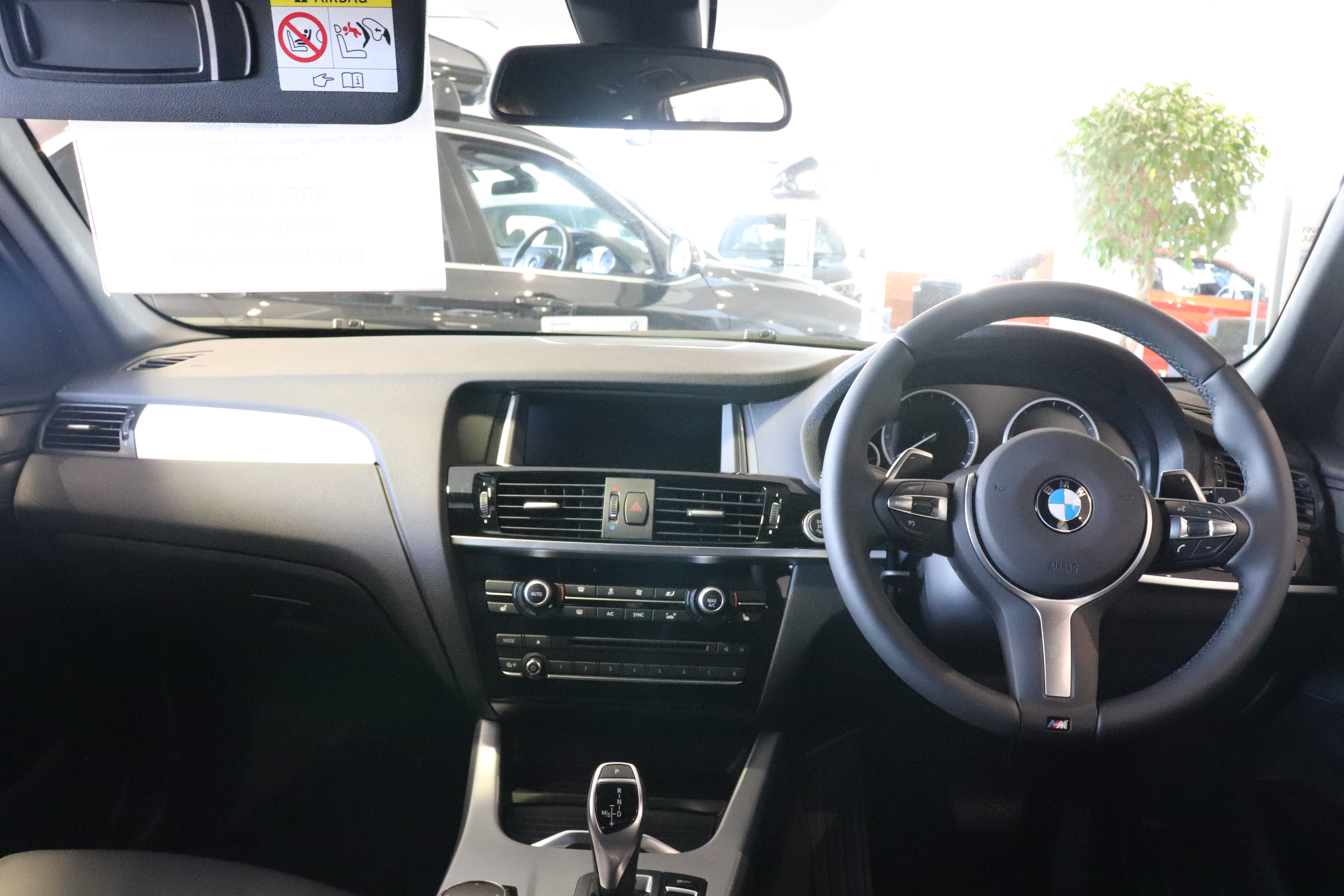
Interior

The F25 is the second generation of BMW X3. The vehicle was unveiled in 2010 at the 2010 Paris Motor Show. For this generation, production moved from Magna Steyr in Austria to at BMW's United States plant in Greer, South Carolina. Production started on 1 September 2010, and ended in August 2017.

Dimensions-wise, the F25-based X3 is almost as large as the original E53 series X5. At launch, all models use all-wheel drive, badged as xDrive. Transmission choices are a six-speed manual or eight-speed ZF 8HP automatic transmission. The emission standard for all engines was Euro 5, until the June 2014 LCI facelift when all diesels became Euro 6. A rear-wheel drive only model called sDrive was added to the range in some markets in 2012.

M Performance Parts were released in the facelift and can be installed to all models. These include carbon fibre mirrors, a sport steering wheel, M rims, black kidney grilles and Aluminium pedals. 30d models also get a power boost kit making 27 hp more (286 hp) and 18d and 20d models can be fitted with a dual exhaust.

Europe

UK models went on sale on 18 November 2010. Early UK models included the xDrive20d. xDrive30d was added in April 2011. xDrive35d was added from September 2011. sDrive18d was added on 20 August 2012. From early 2013, the latest generation of BMW Professional Navigation System became available.

North America

US models arrived in US BMW Centres by the end of 2010 as 2011 model year vehicles. Early US models included xDrive28i, xDrive35i. In 2013 model year (produced in April 2012 and delivered in May 2012), a turbo four cylinder xDrive28i was introduced as replacement for the inline six xDrive28i, with new features such as standard Auto Start/Stop, Driving Dynamics Control with ECO PRO, New Driver Assistance Package (includes Lane Departure Warning). All US market vehicles come with an 8-speed automatic transmission.

For 2011, the F25 X3 is available in the US, only with a 3.0-liter inline six-cylinder gasoline engine either normally aspirated or with a twin-scroll turbocharger.

In 2012, the F25 X3 xDrive28i model's 3.0L naturally aspirated inline six-cylinder gasoline engine was replaced by the 2.0L TwinPower twin-scroll, single-turbo inline four-cylinder gasoline engine that was first introduced on the BMW 3 Series (F30), the BMW N20, more specifically coded N20B20O0. A rear-wheel-drive sDrive28i model joined the X3 model line-up, marking the first non-xDrive BMW SAV to ever be sold in the United States.

In 2013, the F25 X3 xDrive28d model joined the X3 line-up, powered by a 2.0L turbocharged inline four-cylinder diesel engine, again first introduced on the BMW 3 Series (F30). As of 2017, the xDrive28d model of the F25 X3 is no longer available for sale in the United States.

=== 2014 facelift (LCI) ===
In 2014 for the 2015 model year, the F25 received an LCI (Life Cycle Impulse) facelift. Changes include new modified twin circular headlights (optional LED headlights), redesigned kidney grille, new front, and rear bumpers, and exterior mirrors with integrated turn signal indicators; a centre console with the optional automatic climate control system in high-gloss black-panel look, new cup holders with a sliding cover for the centre console, new exterior colours, upholstery designs, interior trim strips, and light-alloy wheels; new xLine equipment package, optional Smart Opener for the automatic tailgate and storage packages.

The vehicle was unveiled in 84th Geneva International Motor Show 2014, followed by 114th New York International Auto Show 2014 (xDrive28d).

=== Emission violations reported ===
BMW X3 20d diesel was reported to exceed EU Limit Euro 6 by over 11 times. On 24 September 2015, BMW denied this report in a statement.

Pre-facelift styling

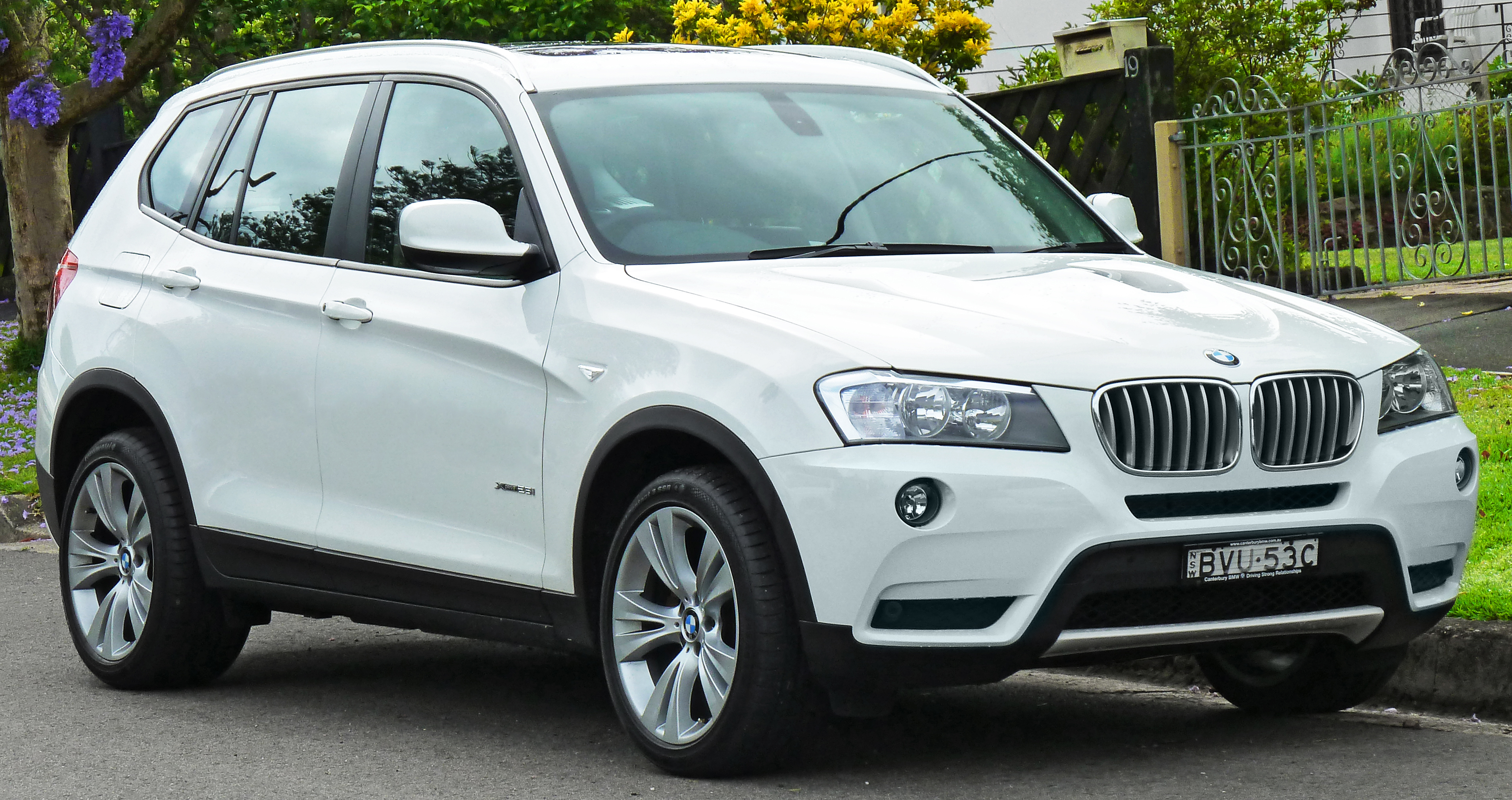
Front (xDrive28i)

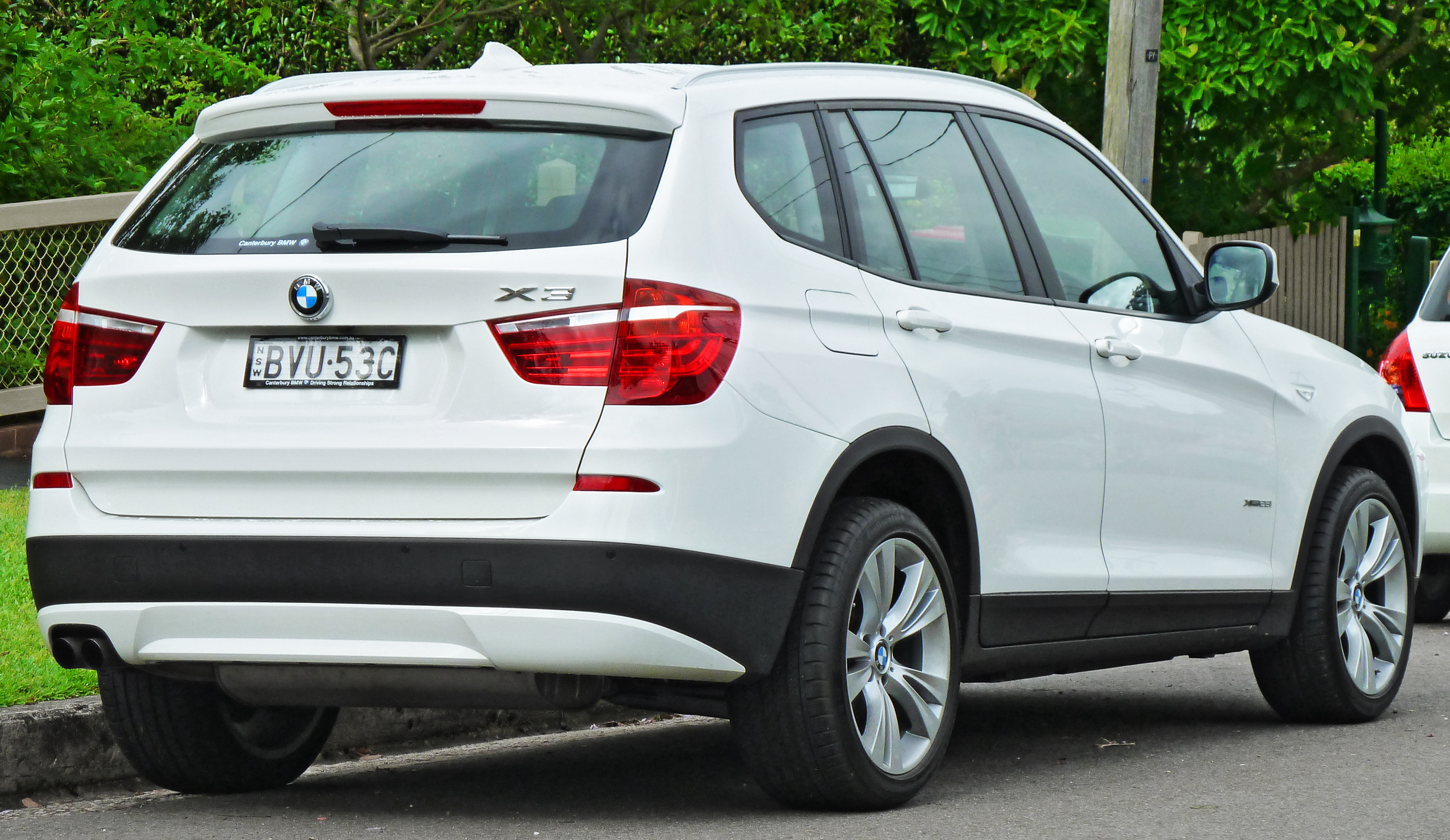
Rear (xDrive28i)

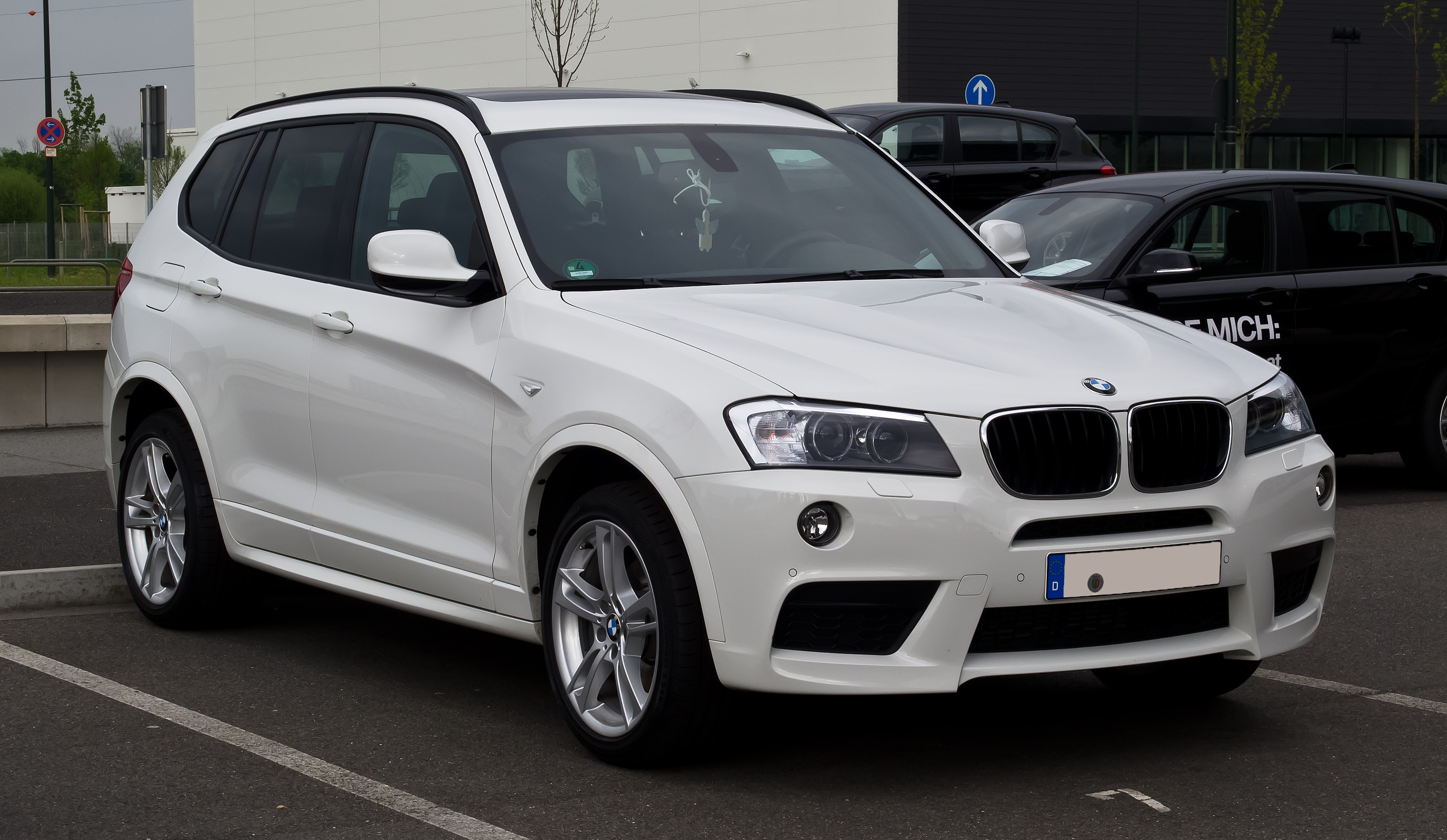
Front (M Sport)

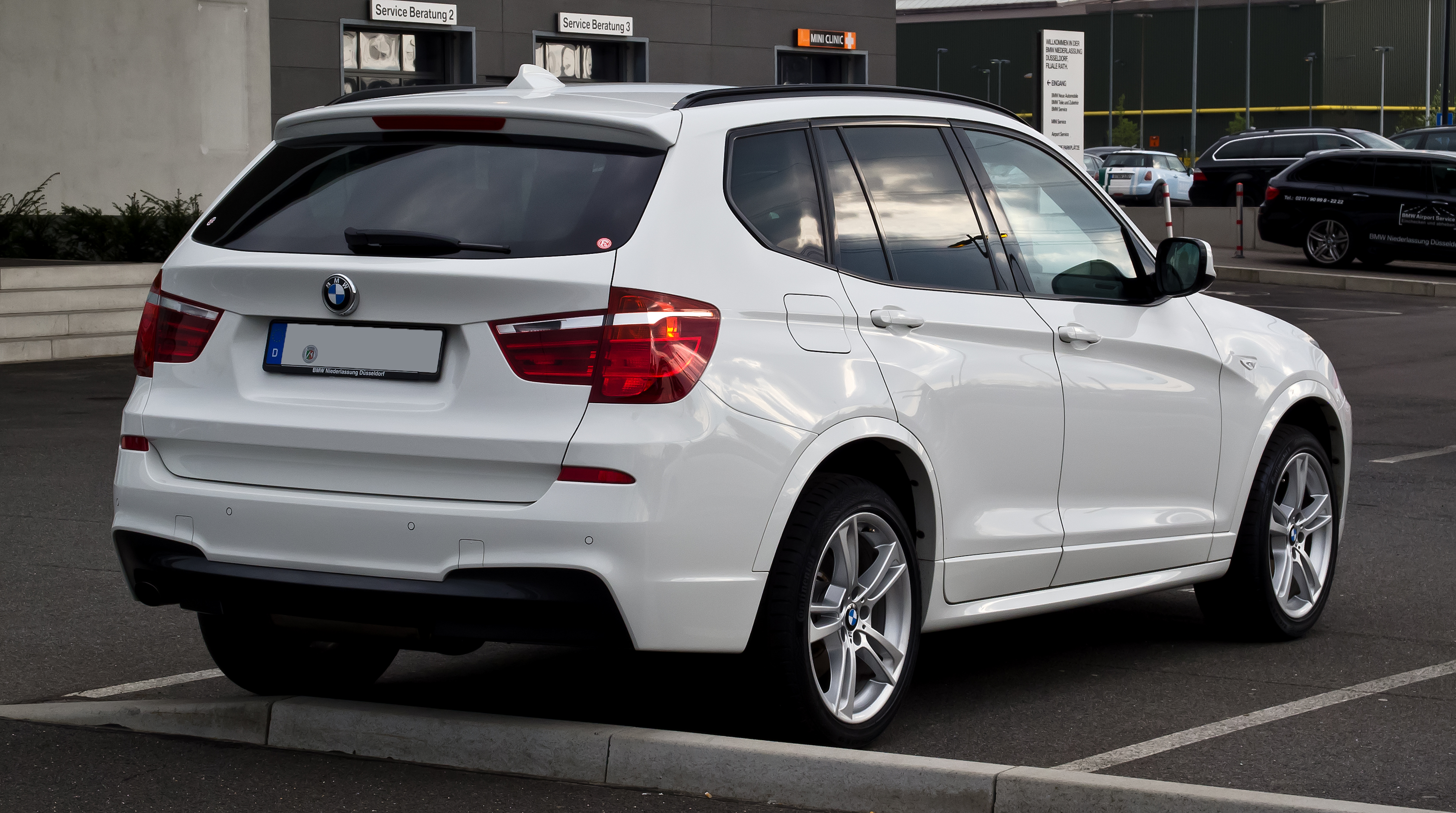
Rear (M Sport)

Post-facelift styling

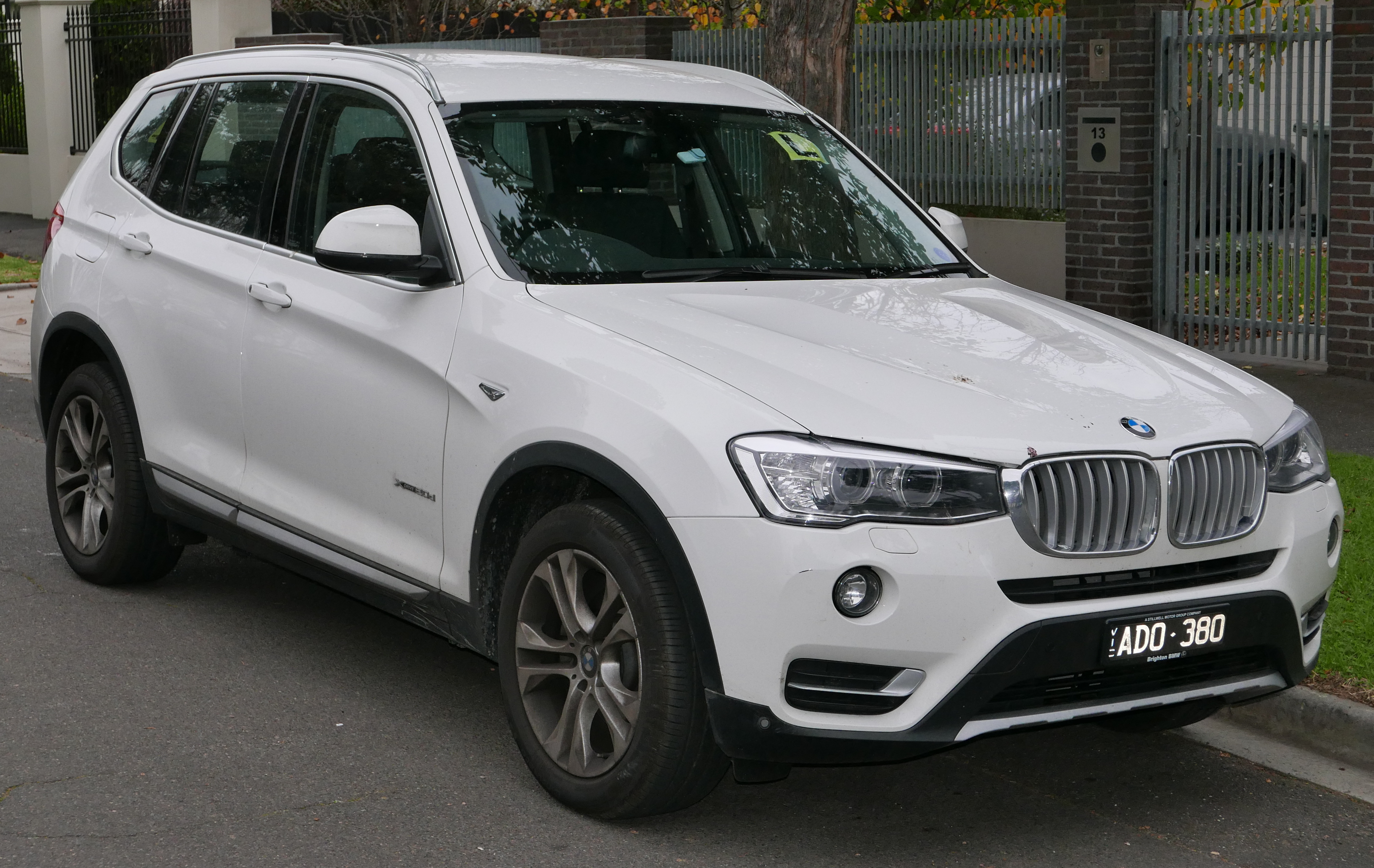
Front (xDrive20d)

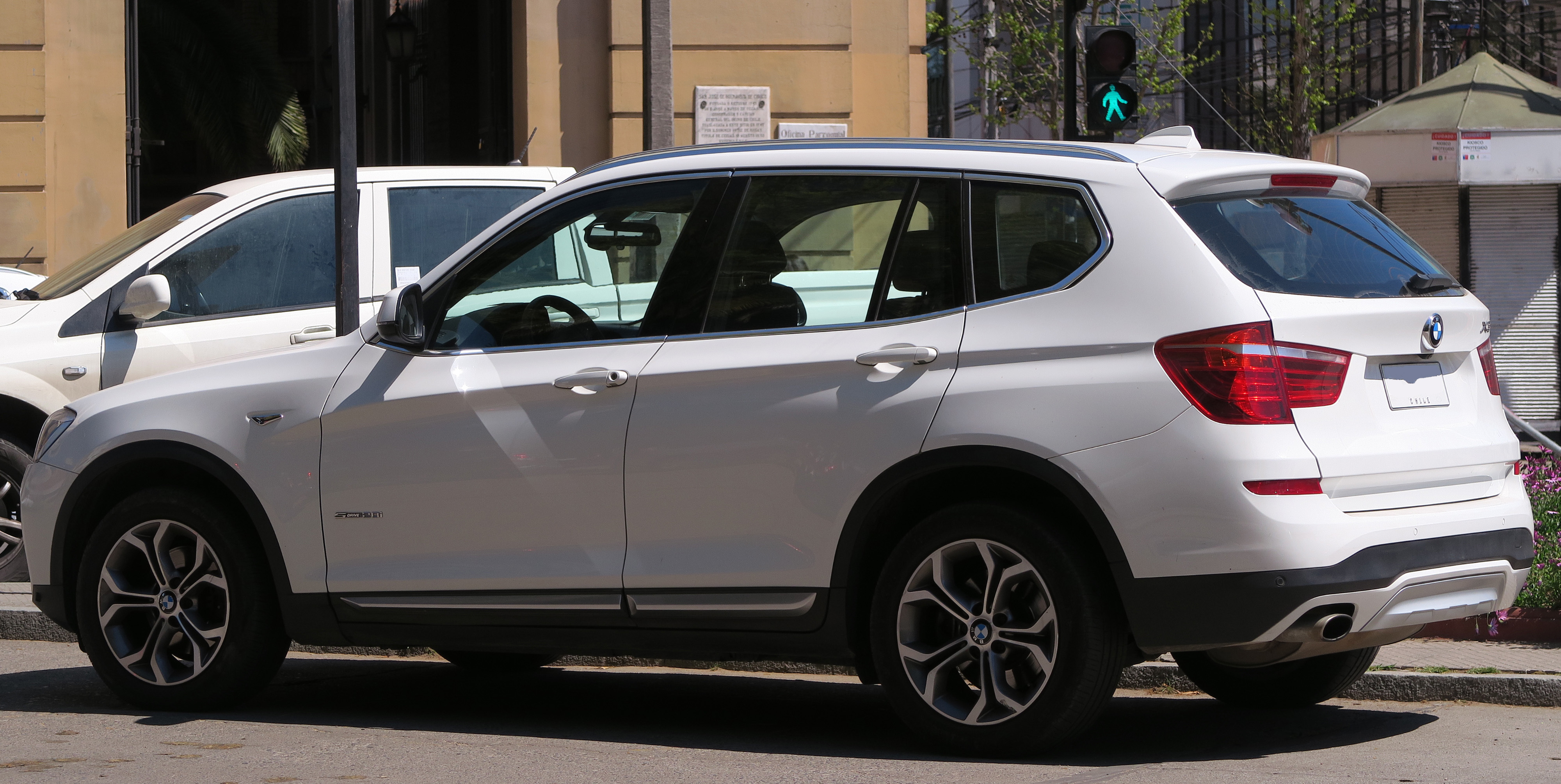
Rear

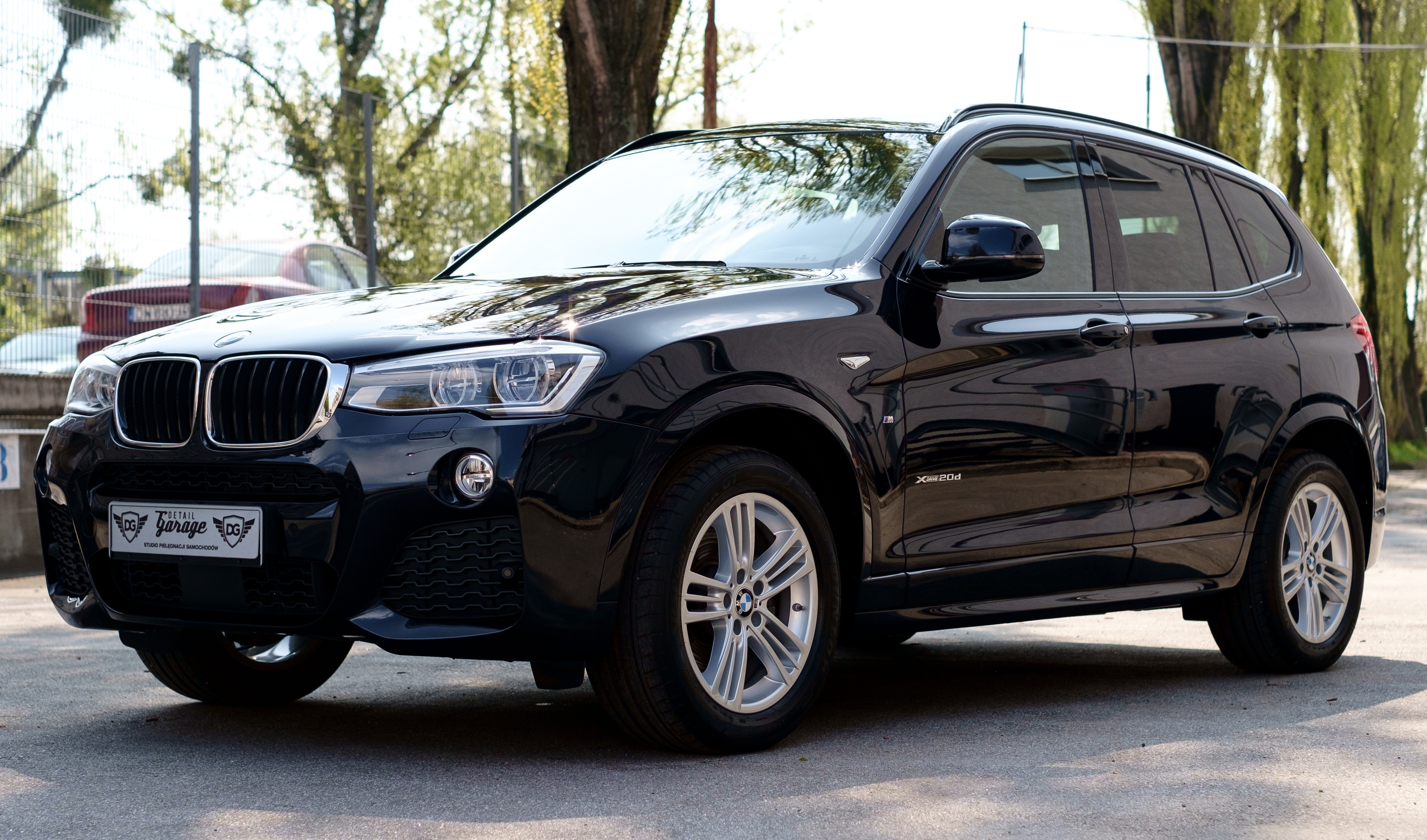
Front (M Sport)

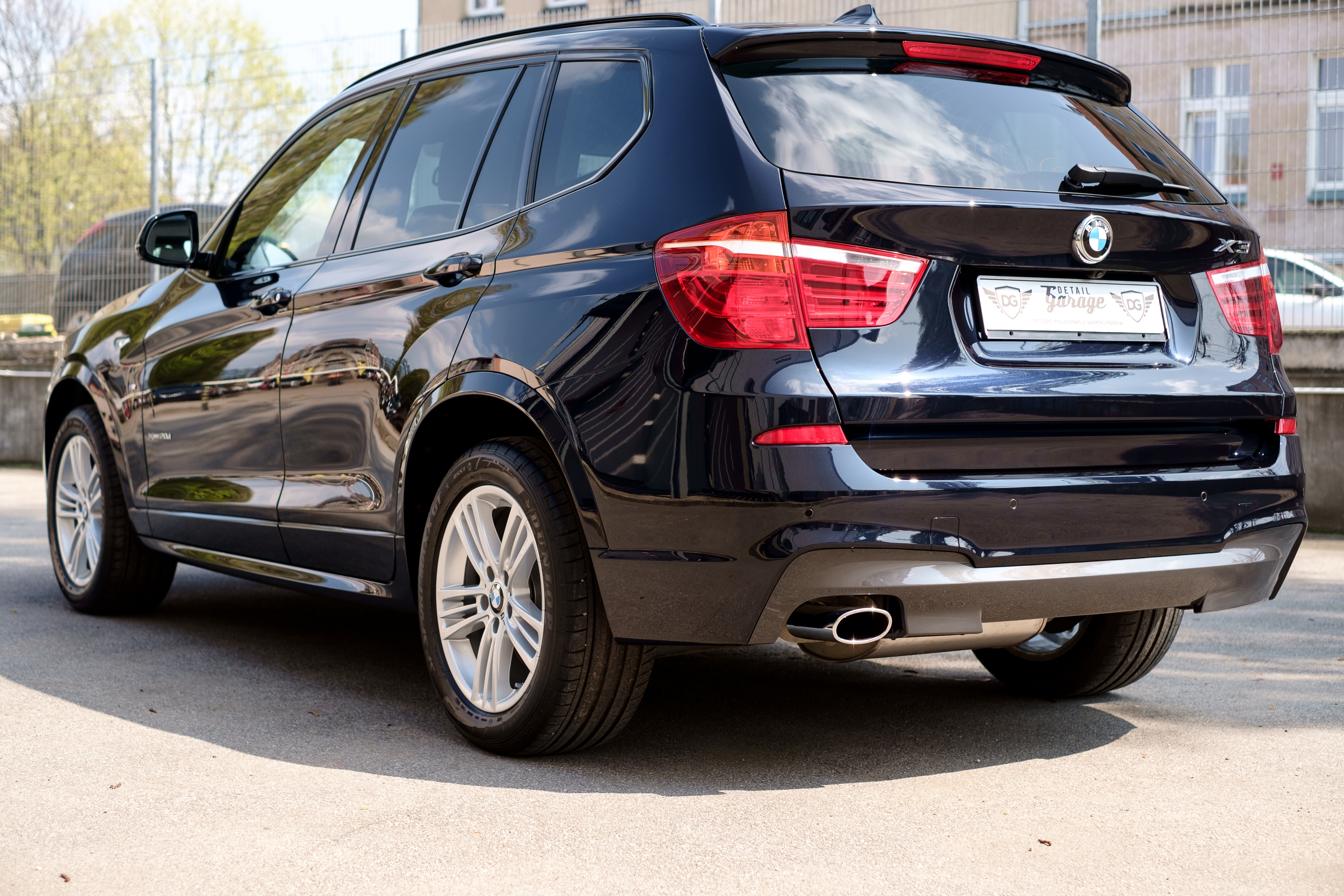
Rear (M Sport)

=== Engines ===
Petrol engines
Model	Years	Engine	Power	Torque	0–100 km/h (0–62 mph)	Top speed	Notes
sDrive20i, xDrive20i	2011–2017	2.0 L N20 straight-4 turbo	135 kW (184 PS; 181 hp) at 5,000–6,250 rpm	270 N⋅m (199 lb⋅ft) at 1,250–4,500 rpm	8.5 s	210 km/h (130 mph)	
xDrive28i	2011–2012	3.0 L N52 straight-6 (N.A.)	190 kW (258 PS; 255 hp) at 6,600 rpm	310 N⋅m (229 lb⋅ft) at 2,600–3,000 rpm	6.5 s	230 km/h (143 mph)	
xDrive28i	2011–2012	3.0 L N52 straight-6 (N.A.)	179 kW (243 PS; 240 hp) at 6,600 rpm	300 N⋅m (221 lb⋅ft) at 2,750 rpm	6.6 s	230 km/h (143 mph)	US model
xDrive28i	2012–2017	2.0 L N20 straight-4 turbo	180 kW (245 PS; 242 hp) at 5,000 rpm	350 N⋅m (258 lb⋅ft) at 1,250–4,800 rpm	6.5 s	230 km/h (143 mph)	
xDrive35i	2011–2017	3.0 L N55 straight-6 turbo	225 kW (306 PS; 302 hp) at 5,800 rpm	400 N⋅m (295 lb⋅ft) at 1,200–5,000 rpm	5.9 s	245 km/h (152 mph)	

Diesel engines
Model	Years	Engine	Power	Torque	0–100 km/h (0–62 mph)	Top speed	Notes
sDrive18d	2012–2014	2.0 L N47 straight-4 turbo	105 kW (143 PS; 141 hp) at 4,000 rpm	360 N⋅m (266 lb⋅ft) at 1,750–2,500 rpm	9.9 s	195 km/h (121 mph)	
sDrive18d	2015–2017	2.0 L B47 straight-4 turbo	110 kW (150 PS; 148 hp) at 4,000 rpm	360 N⋅m (266 lb⋅ft) at 1,500–2,250 rpm	9.5 s	195 km/h (121 mph)	
xDrive20d	2011–2014	2.0 L N47 straight-4 turbo	135 kW (184 PS; 181 hp) at 4,000 rpm	380 N⋅m (280 lb⋅ft) at 1,750–2,750 rpm	8.3 s	210 km/h (130 mph)	
xDrive20d	2015–2017	2.0 L B47 straight-4 turbo	140 kW (190 PS; 188 hp) at 4,000 rpm	400 N⋅m (295 lb⋅ft) at 1,750–2,250 rpm	8.1 s	210 km/h (130 mph)	
xDrive28d (Note: United States only. The xDrive28d used the four-cylinder engine from the European-specification xDrive20d models. Since late 2008, US market diesel vehicles were equipped with selective catalytic converters using Diesel exhaust fluid (DEF) to reduce NOx emissions, while vehicles sold in Europe had a bypass exhaust pipe only.)	2015–2017	2.0 L N47 straight-4 turbo	134 kW (182 PS; 180 hp) at 4,000 rpm	380 N⋅m (280 lb⋅ft) at 1,750–2,750 rpm	7.9 s	210 km/h (130 mph)	US model
xDrive30d	2011–2017	3.0 L N57 straight-6 turbo	190 kW (258 PS; 255 hp) at 4,000 rpm	560 N⋅m (413 lb⋅ft) at 2,000–2,750 rpm	6.2 s	230 km/h (143 mph)	
xDrive35d	2011–2017	3.0 L N57 straight-6 turbo	230 kW (313 PS; 308 hp) at 4,400 rpm	630 N⋅m (465 lb⋅ft) at 1,500–2,500 rpm	5.5 s	244 km/h (152 mph)	

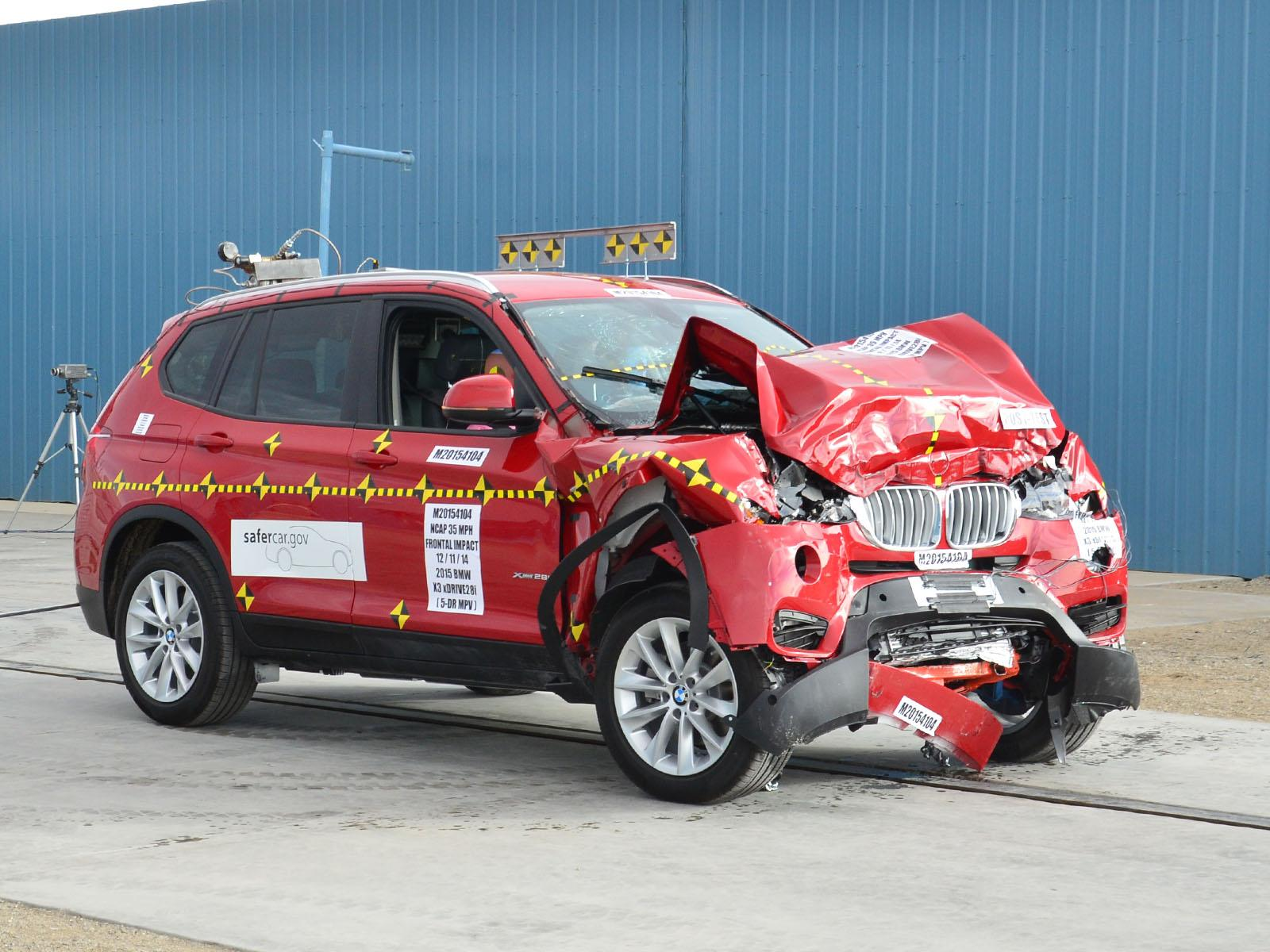
An NHTSA-tested 2015 X3. Full frontal-width test at 56 km/h (35 mph)

=== Safety ===
==== ANCAP ====
ANCAP test results* BMW X3 4 cylinder engine variants (2011)
Test	Score
Overall	5 /5 stars
Frontal offset	14.58/16
Side impact	16/16
Pole	2/2
Seat belt reminders	2/3
Whiplash protection	Good
Pedestrian protection	Adequate
Electronic stability control	Standard

==== Euro NCAP ====
Euro NCAP test results* BMW X3 2.0 Diesel (LHD) (2011)
Test	Points	%
Overall:	5 /5 stars	
Adult occupant:	31.6	88%
Child occupant:	40.9	83%
Pedestrian:	19.1	53%
Safety assist:	5	71%

==== IIHS ====
IIHS scores (2011 model year)
Moderate overlap front (original test)	Good
Side (original test)	Good
Head restraints and seats	Good

== Third generation (G01; 2017) ==
Third generation
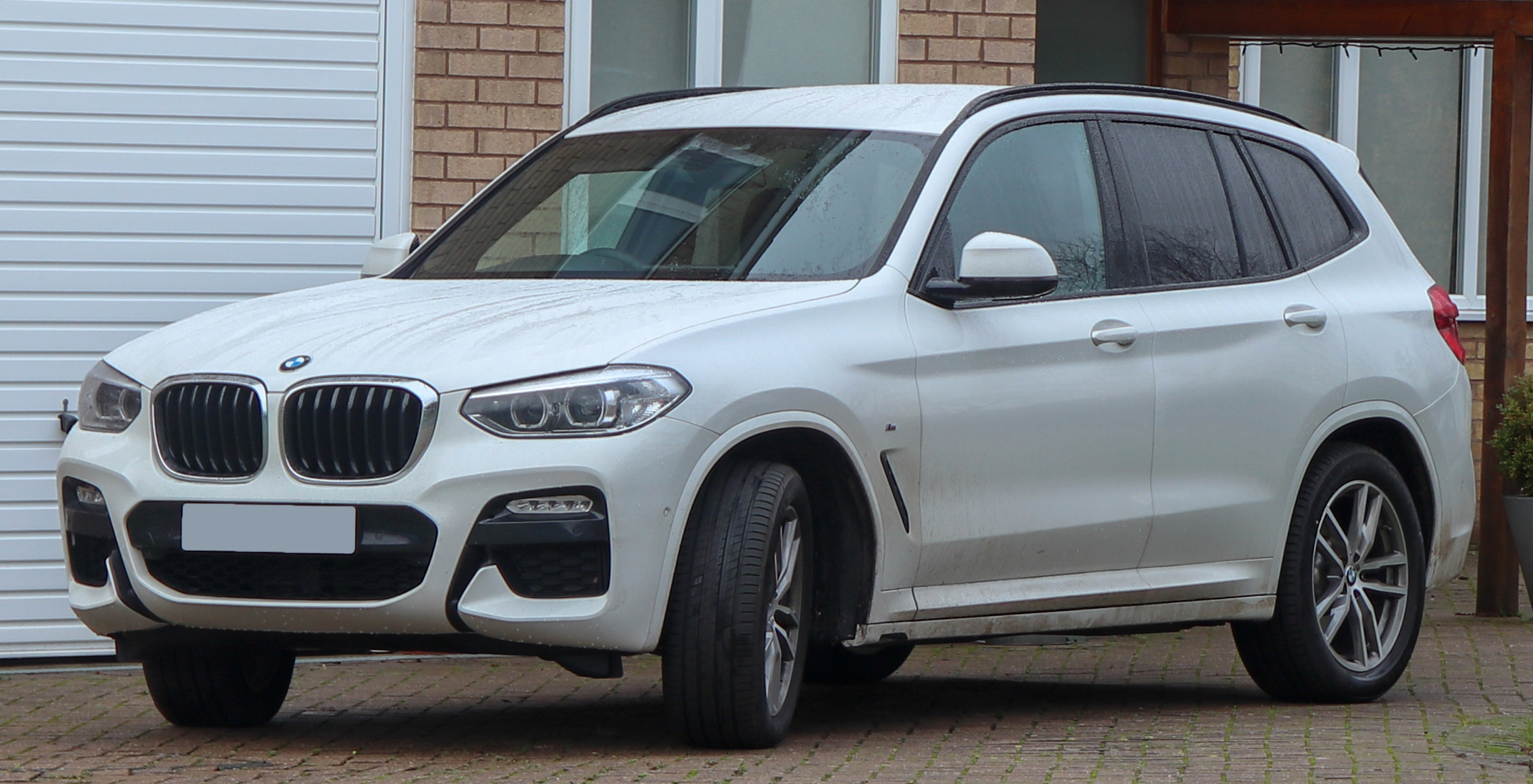
- BMW X3 M Sport (2018)

Overview
- Model code: G01 (X3); F97 (X3 M); G08 (iX3)
- Production: August 2017 – August 2024
- Model years: 2018–2024
- Assembly: United States: Greer, South Carolina (Plant Spartanburg); South Africa: Rosslyn (BMW SA); China: Dadong (BBA); Brazil: Araquari (BMW do Brasil); India: Chennai (BMW India); Thailand: Rayong (BMW Thailand); Malaysia: Kulim, Kedah (Inokom); Indonesia: Jakarta (Gaya Motor); Russia: Kaliningrad (Avtotor); Egypt: 6th of October City (BAG); Vietnam: Chu Lai, Quang Nam (THACO)
- Designer: Calvin Luk

Body and chassis
- Layout: Front-engine, rear-wheel-drive (sDrive); Front-engine, four-wheel-drive (xDrive); Rear motor, rear-wheel drive (iX3)
- Platform: BMW CLAR platform
- Related: BMW X4 (G02)

Powertrain
- Engine: Petrol: 2.0 L B48 I4 turbo; 3.0 L B58 I6 turbo; 3.0 L S58 I6 twin-turbo; Petrol plug-in hybrid: 2.0 L B48 I4 turbo with electric motor; Diesel: 2.0 L B47 I4 turbo; 3.0 L B57 I6 turbo/twin-turbo
- Electric motor: 50 kW (67 hp) synchronous electric motor (PHEV, 2018–2019); 80 kW (107 hp) synchronous electric motor (PHEV, 2020–present); 210 kW (282 hp) synchronous electric motor (iX3)
- Transmission: 8-speed ZF 8HP automatic; Single-speed with fixed ratio (iX3)
- Hybrid drivetrain: Mild hybrid Plug-in hybrid
- Battery: 12 kWh lithium ion (PHEV); 80 kWh lithium ion (iX3)

Dimensions
- Wheelbase: 2,864 mm (112.8 in)
- Length: 4,708 mm (185.4 in)
- Width: 1,891 mm (74.4 in)
- Height: 1,676 mm (66.0 in)

Chronology
- Successor: BMW iX3 (NA5) (electric version)

The third generation is codenamed G01 and was unveiled in June 2017. Designed by Calvin Luk, BMW's Australian designer, drivetrains include two 2.0-litre diesel units known as B47, a next-generation 3.0-litre diesel engine (B57), and a petrol variant (B58): a gasoline-powered, turbo-charged straight-six with a displacement of 2,998 cc and a plug-in hybrid.

Technology is shared with the BMW 5 Series (G30), such as gesture control (optional), LED exterior and interior lighting, and the BMW iDrive 6.0 system with a 12.5-inch touch-screen monitor for navigation systems. Depending on the model, the new X3 is as much as 55 kg (121 lb) lighter than a comparably equipped corresponding model from the previous X3 generation.

The BMW X3 is well-regarded for its safety, having earned a five-star rating from the National Highway Traffic Safety Administration (NHTSA) and a Top Safety Pick+ award from the Insurance Institute for Highway Safety (IIHS).

In July 2018, BMW introduced the ability to option the X3 with the sDrive intelligent rear-wheel drive system.

In 2019, the X3 xDrive 30e (which shares its powertrain and platform with the G20 330e xDrive) iPerformance model was introduced, sharing its engine with the X3 sDrive20i/xDrive20i and a 50 kW (67 hp) electric motor, it has a maximum electric range of 27–30 mi (43–48 km). It has a 12 kWh battery (9.6 kWh usable) along with a newly developed system called "XtraBoost" allowing a temporary power increase from the electric motor of up to 30 kW (40 hp).

In early 2020, the X3 xDrive20d was given a mild hybrid 48 volt system.

All non-X3 M models, including the iX3 can be fitted with M Performance Parts. These include carbon fibre mirrors.

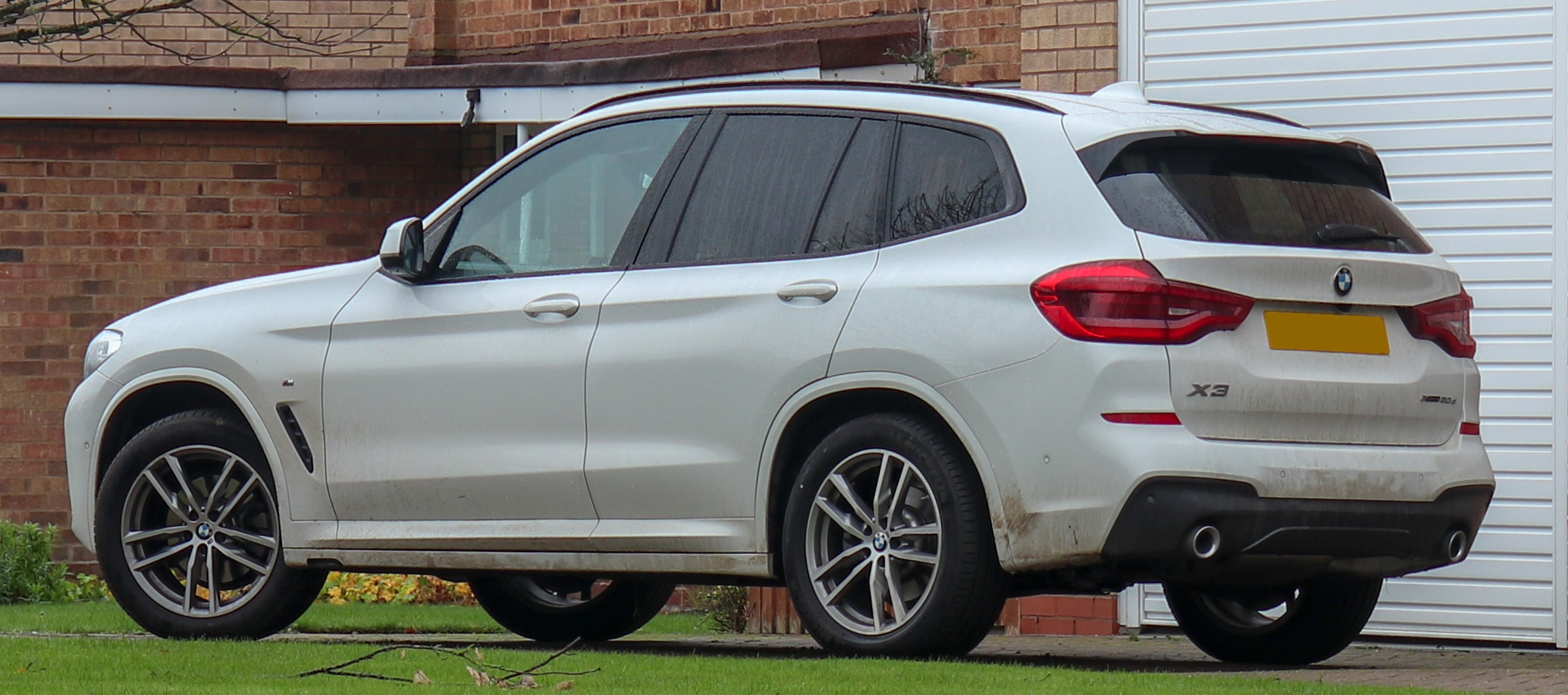
2018 BMW X3 xDrive 20d M Sport

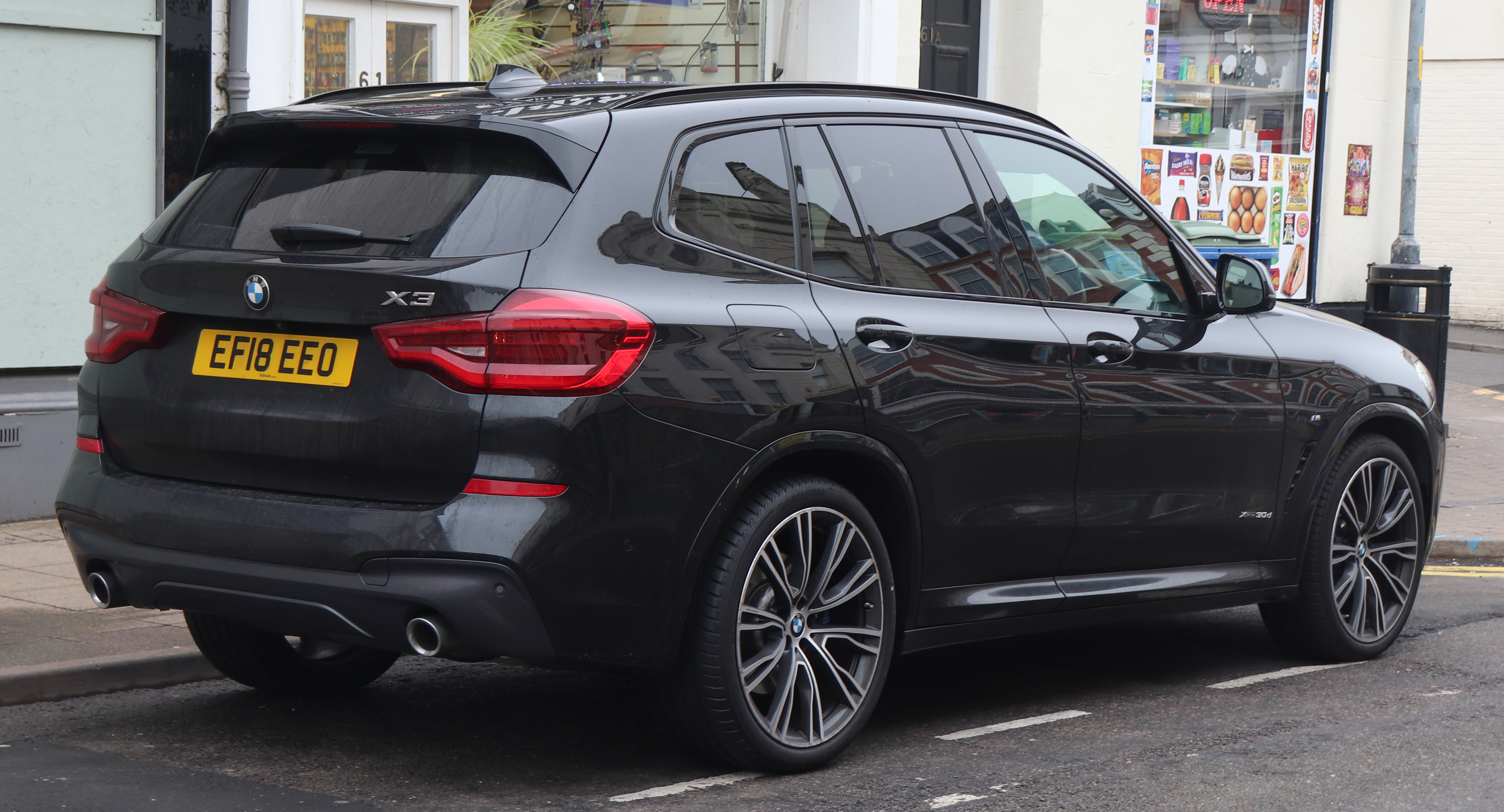
2018 BMW X3 xDrive 30d M Sport

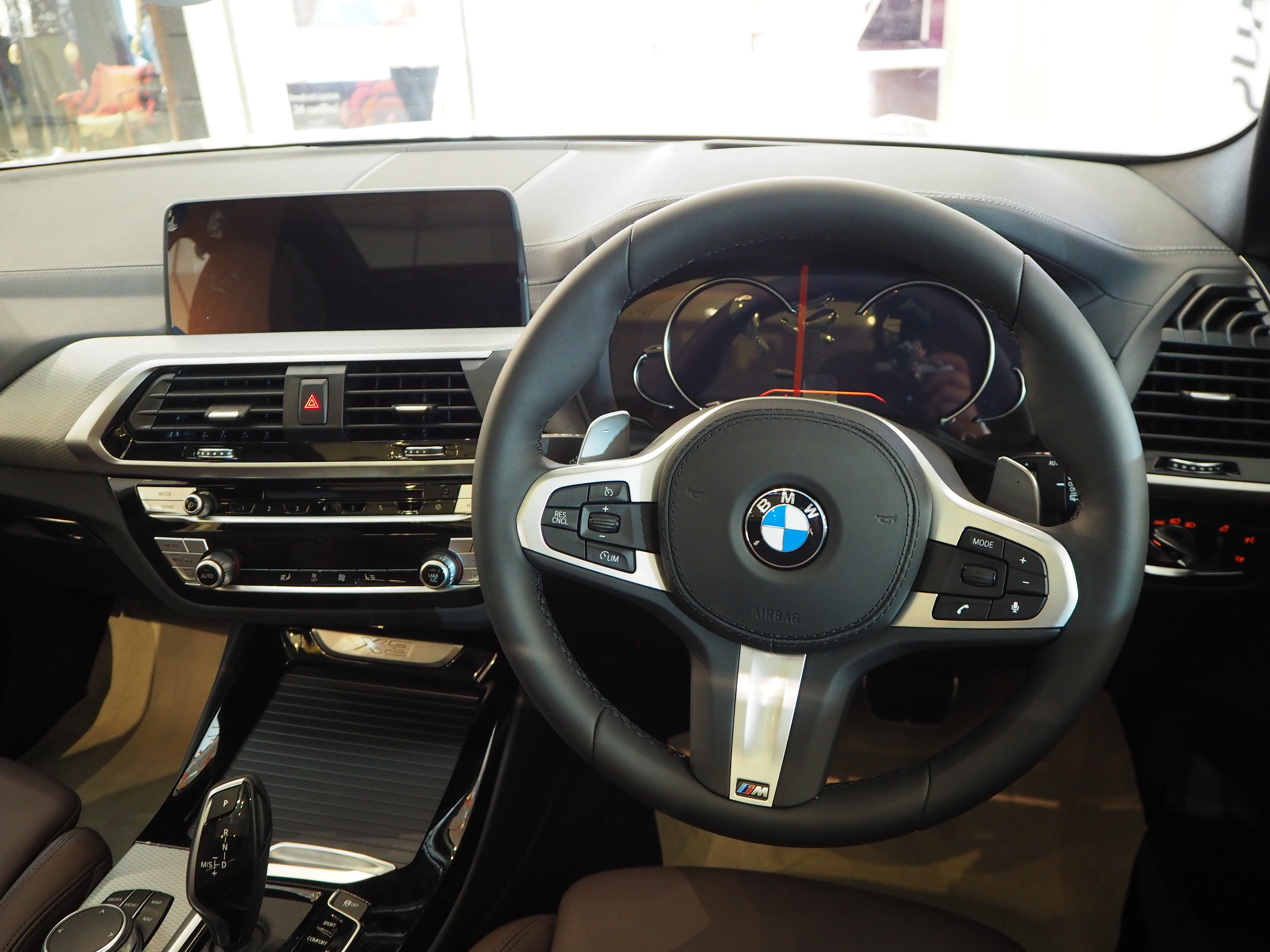
Interior

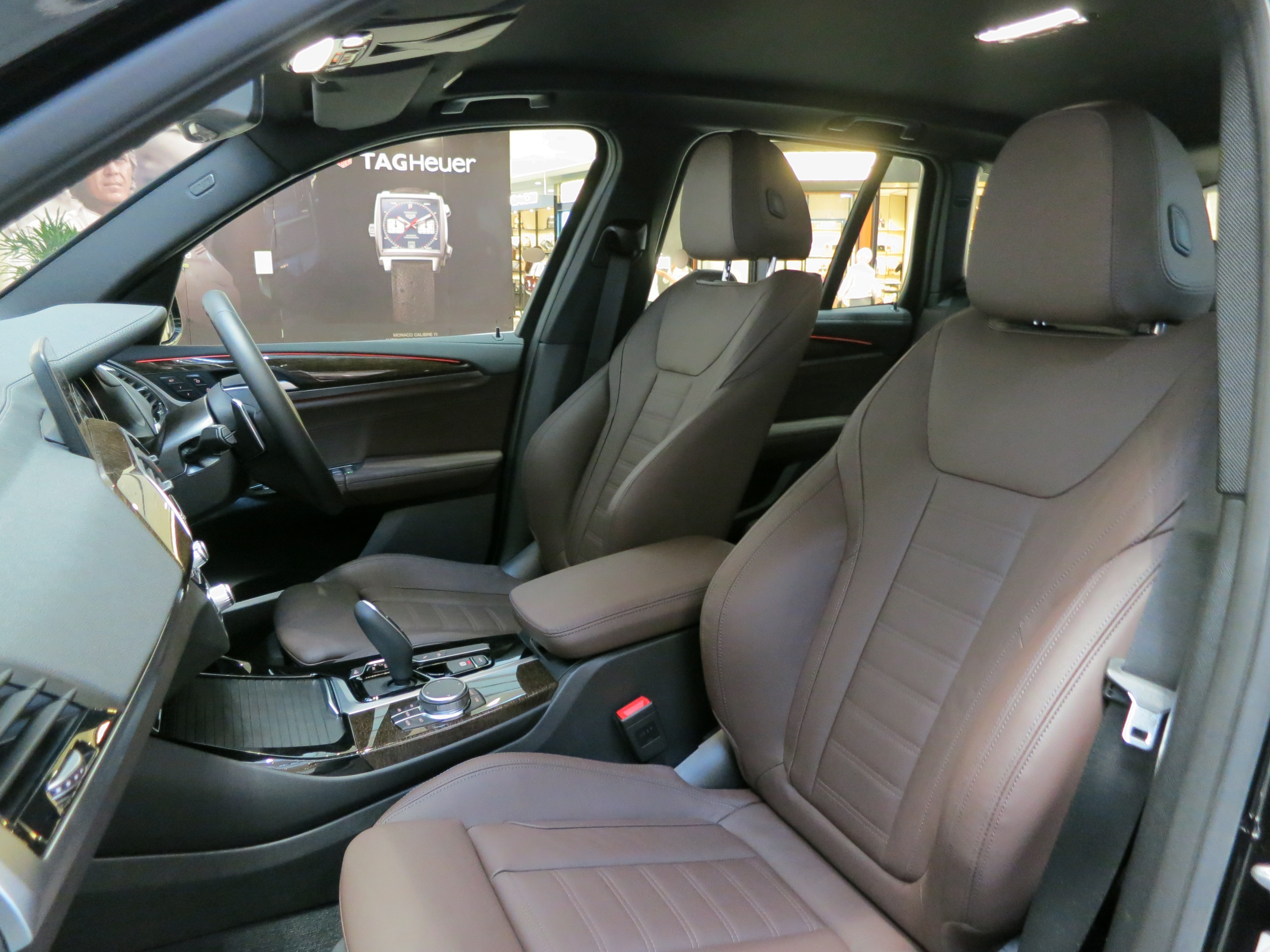
Interior

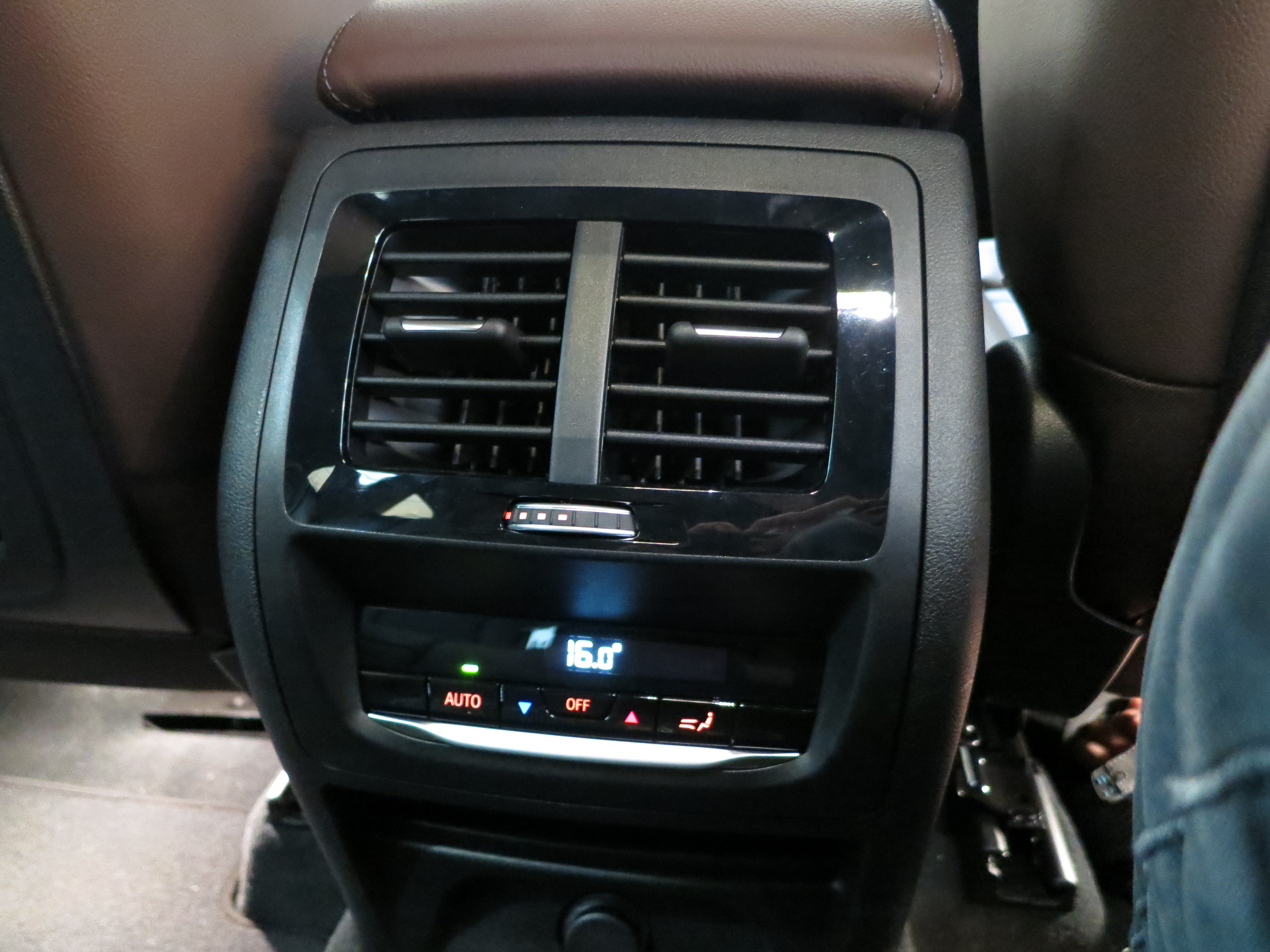
Interior

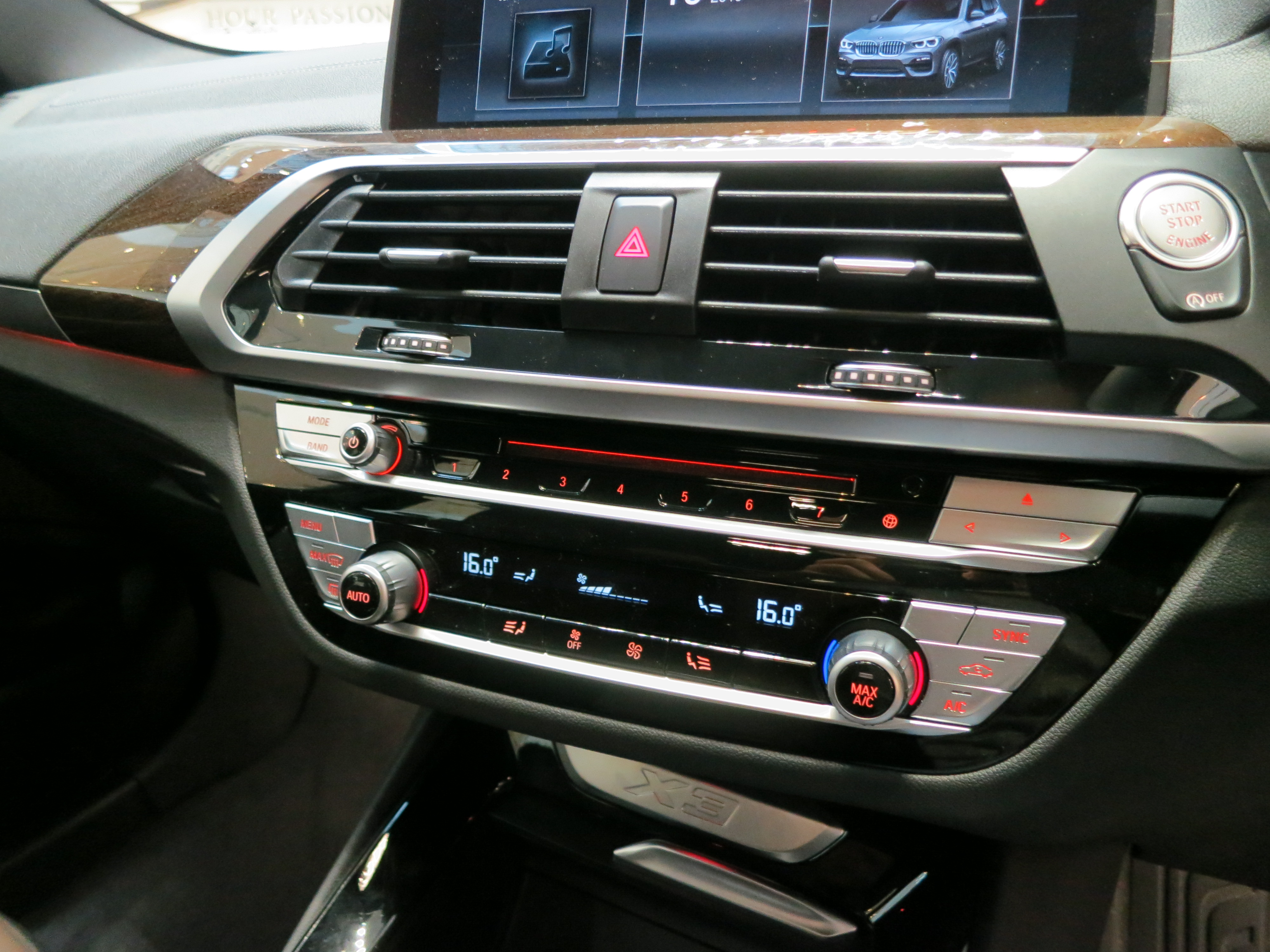
Interior

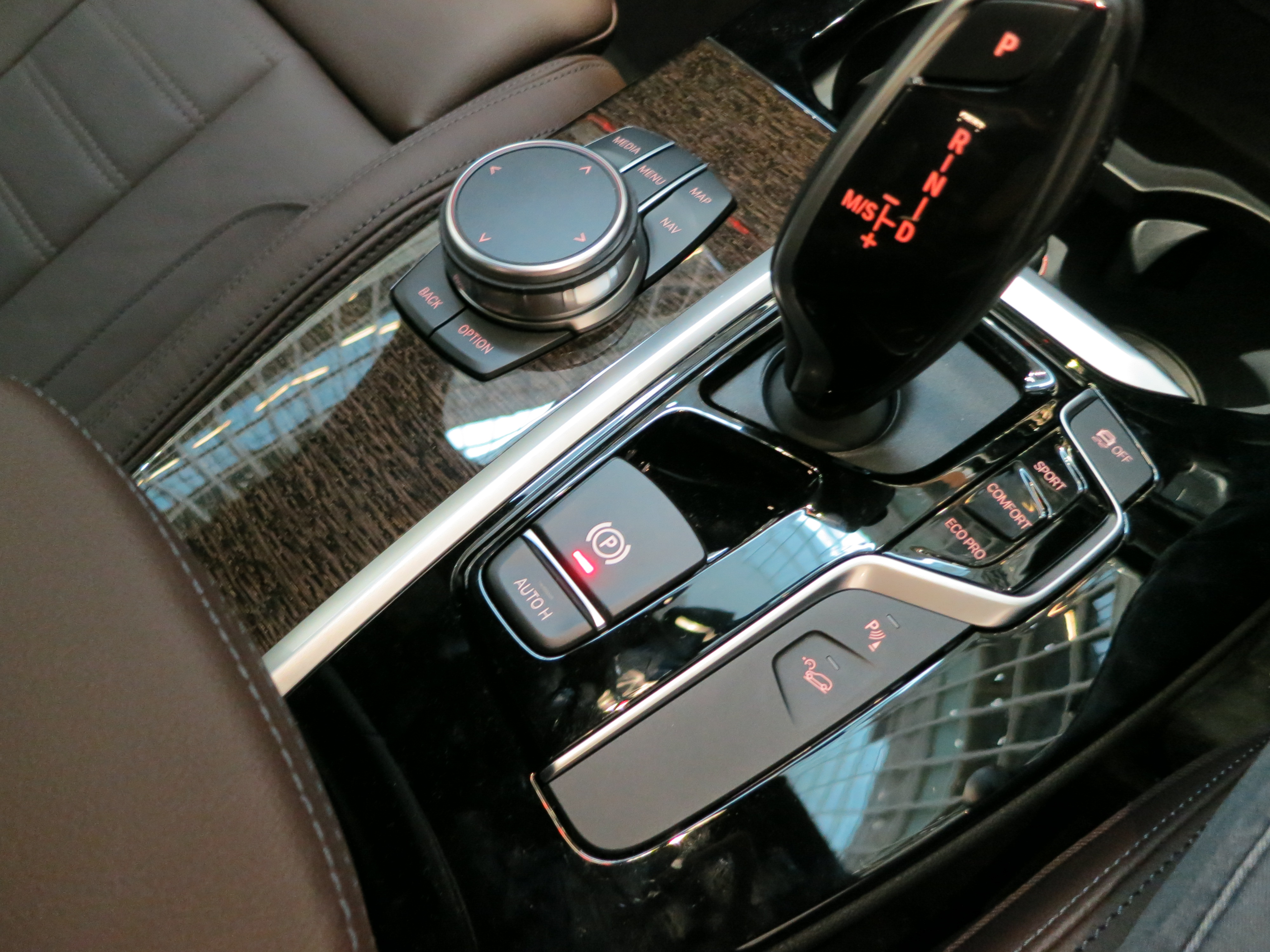
Interior

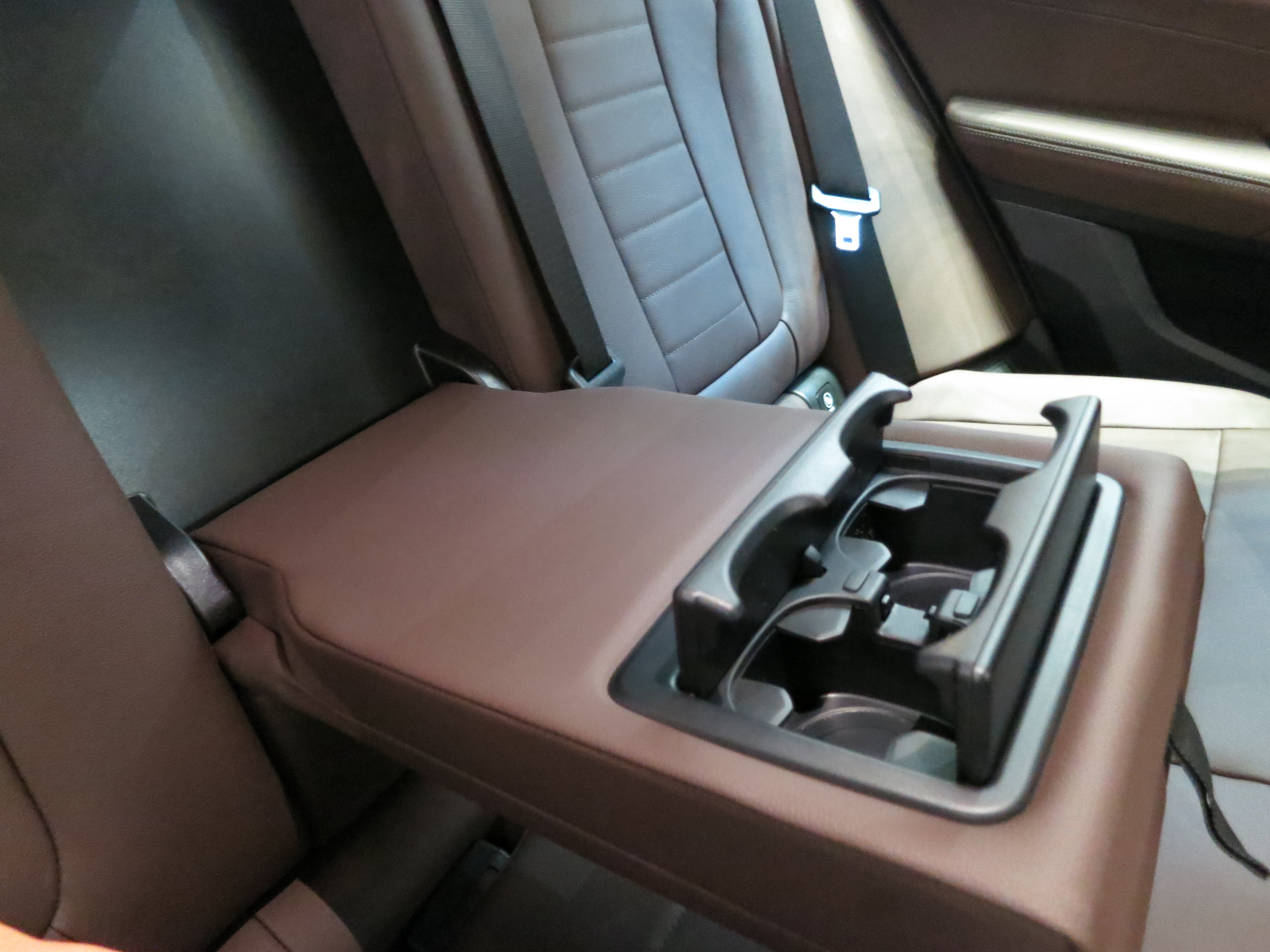
Interior

=== X3 M ===
In 2019, BMW introduced the X3 M and X3 M Competition (F97), being the first time an X3 had a full M version. The X3 M is fitted with a 3.0 L S58 straight-six that produced 473 horsepower with the Competition models producing 503 horsepower.

Full M models can be fitted with full M specific M Performance Parts. These include a spoiler, sport steering wheel, carbon fibre vents and kidney grilles.

BMW X3 M

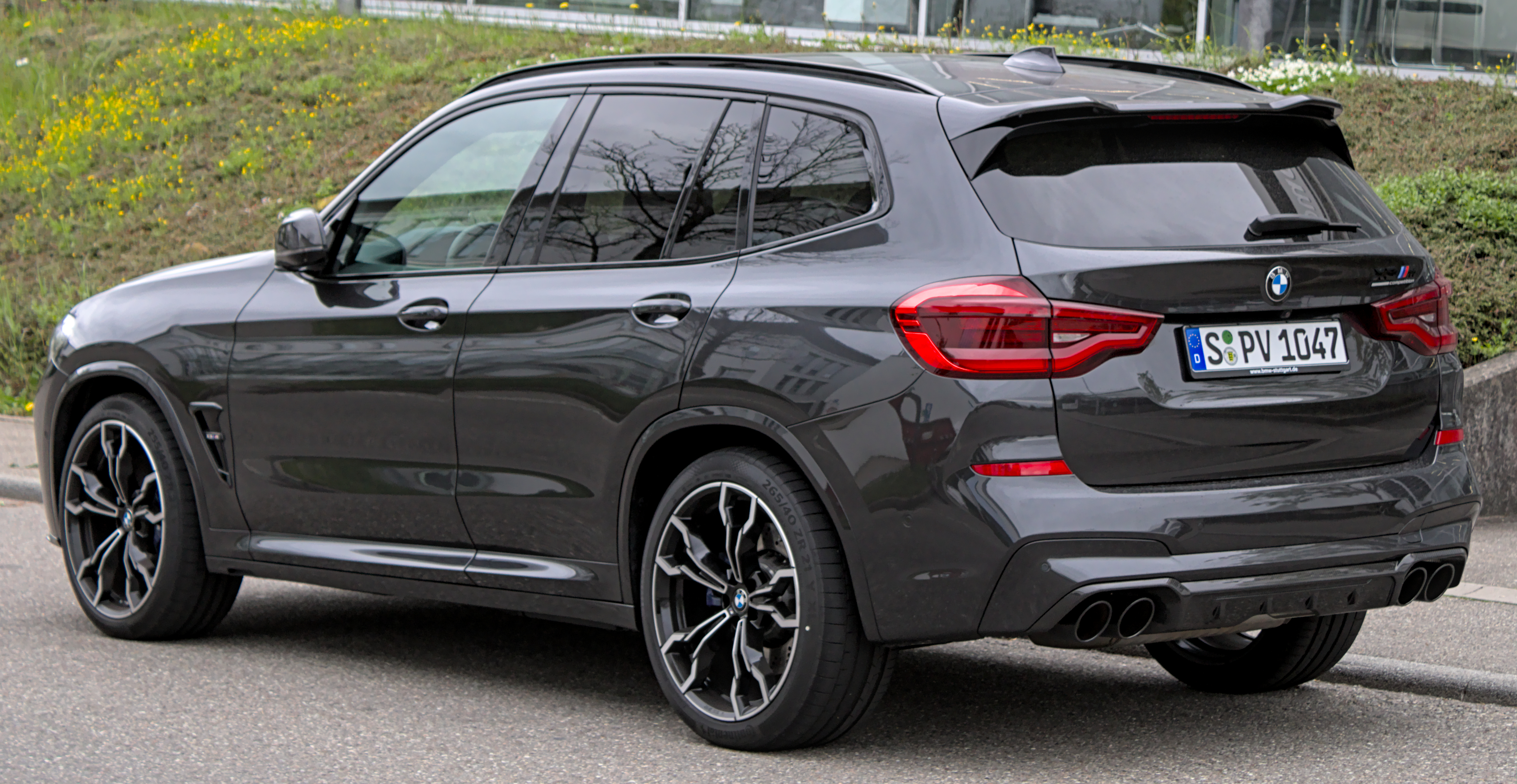
BMW X3 M Competition rear

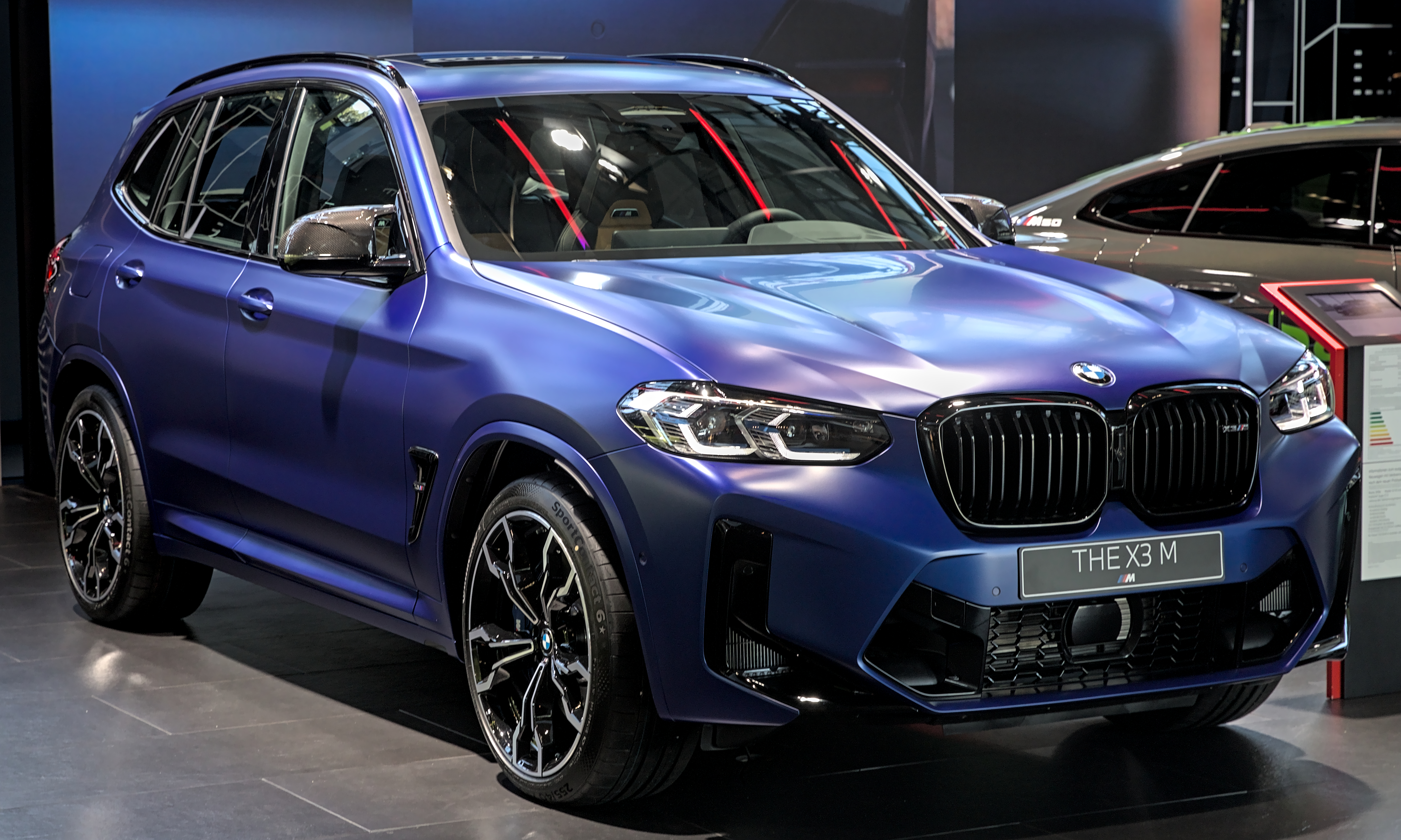
BMW X3 M (facelift)

=== Engines ===
Petrol/hybrid powertrains
Model	Years	Engine- turbo	Power	Torque	0–100 km/h (0–62 mph)	Top speed
sDrive20i/xDrive20i	2018–2024	2.0 L B48B20M0 straight-4	135 kW (184 PS; 181 hp) at 5000 rpm	290 N⋅m (214 lb⋅ft) at 1,350–4,250 rpm	8.4 s	215 km/h (134 mph)
xDrive30e	2020–2024	2.0 L B48B20O0 straight-4 with electric motor	185 kW (252 PS; 248 hp); 210 kW (286 PS; 282 hp) (Note: when Electric Boost is engaged)	420 N⋅m (310 lb⋅ft)	6.1 s	210 km/h (130 mph)
sDrive30i xDrive30i	2018–2024	2.0 L B48B20O0 straight-4	185 kW (252 PS; 248 hp) at 5200 rpm	350 N⋅m (258 lb⋅ft) at 1,520–4,800 rpm	6.6 s 6.4 s	235 km/h (146 mph); 240 km/h (149 mph)
M40i	2018–2019	3.0 L B58B30M0 straight-6	265 kW (360 PS; 355 hp) at 5,500–6,500 rpm	500 N⋅m (369 lb⋅ft) at 1,520–4,800 rpm	4.9 s	250 km/h (155 mph)
M40i	2020–2024	3.0 L B58B30O1 straight-6	285 kW (387 PS; 382 hp) at 5,800–6,500 rpm	495 N⋅m (365 lb⋅ft) at 1,520–4,800 rpm	4.9 s	250 km/h (155 mph)
X3 M	2019–2024	3.0 L S58B30T0 straight-6	353 kW (480 PS; 473 hp) at 6,250 rpm	600 N⋅m (443 lb⋅ft) at 2,600–5,600 rpm	4.0 s	250 km/h (155 mph); 280 km/h (174 mph) (Note: With M Driver's Package)
X3 M Comp.	2019–2024	3.0 L S58B30T0 straight-6	375 kW (510 PS; 503 hp) at 6,250 rpm	600 N⋅m (443 lb⋅ft) at 2,600–5,600 rpm	3.7 s	250 km/h (155 mph); 285 km/h (177 mph)

Diesel powertrains
Model	Years	Engine- turbo	Power	Torque	0–100 km/h (0–62 mph)	Top speed
sDrive18d	2018–2024	2.0 L B47C/D20 straight-4	112 kW (152 PS; 150 hp) at 4,000 rpm	350 N⋅m (258 lb⋅ft) at 1,500–2,500 rpm	9.4 s	198 km/h (123 mph)
xDrive20d	2018–2024	2.0 L B47C/D20 straight-4	140 kW (190 PS; 188 hp) at 4,000 rpm	400 N⋅m (295 lb⋅ft) at 1,750–2,500 rpm	7.9 s	220 km/h (137 mph)
xDrive30d	2018–2024	3.0 L B57D30O0 straight-6	195 kW (265 PS; 261 hp) at 4,000 rpm	620 N⋅m (457 lb⋅ft) at 2,000–2,500 rpm	5.7 s	245 km/h (152 mph)
M40d	2018–2024	3.0 L B57D30T0 straight-6	235 kW (320 PS; 315 hp) at 4,000 rpm	680 N⋅m (502 lb⋅ft) at 1,750–2,250 rpm	4.9 s	250 km/h (155 mph)

Electric powertrains
Model	Years	Motor	Power	Torque	0–100 km/h (0–62 mph)	Top speed	Battery	Range
iX3	2020–2024	synchronous	210 kW (286 PS; 282 hp)	400 N⋅m (295 lb⋅ft)	6.8 s	180 km/h (110 mph)	80 kWh	471 km (293 mi) (Note: iX3 data is calculated by the WLTP measurement procedure (unofficial reported range between 275 – 560 km).)

=== 2021 facelift ===
In June 2021, the mid-life refresh for the X3 was revealed, with production beginning in July for the 2022 model year. Headlights and taillights were redesigned, front and rear fascias were redone, and a 12.3-inch infotainment screen was available for all trims in the United Kingdom.

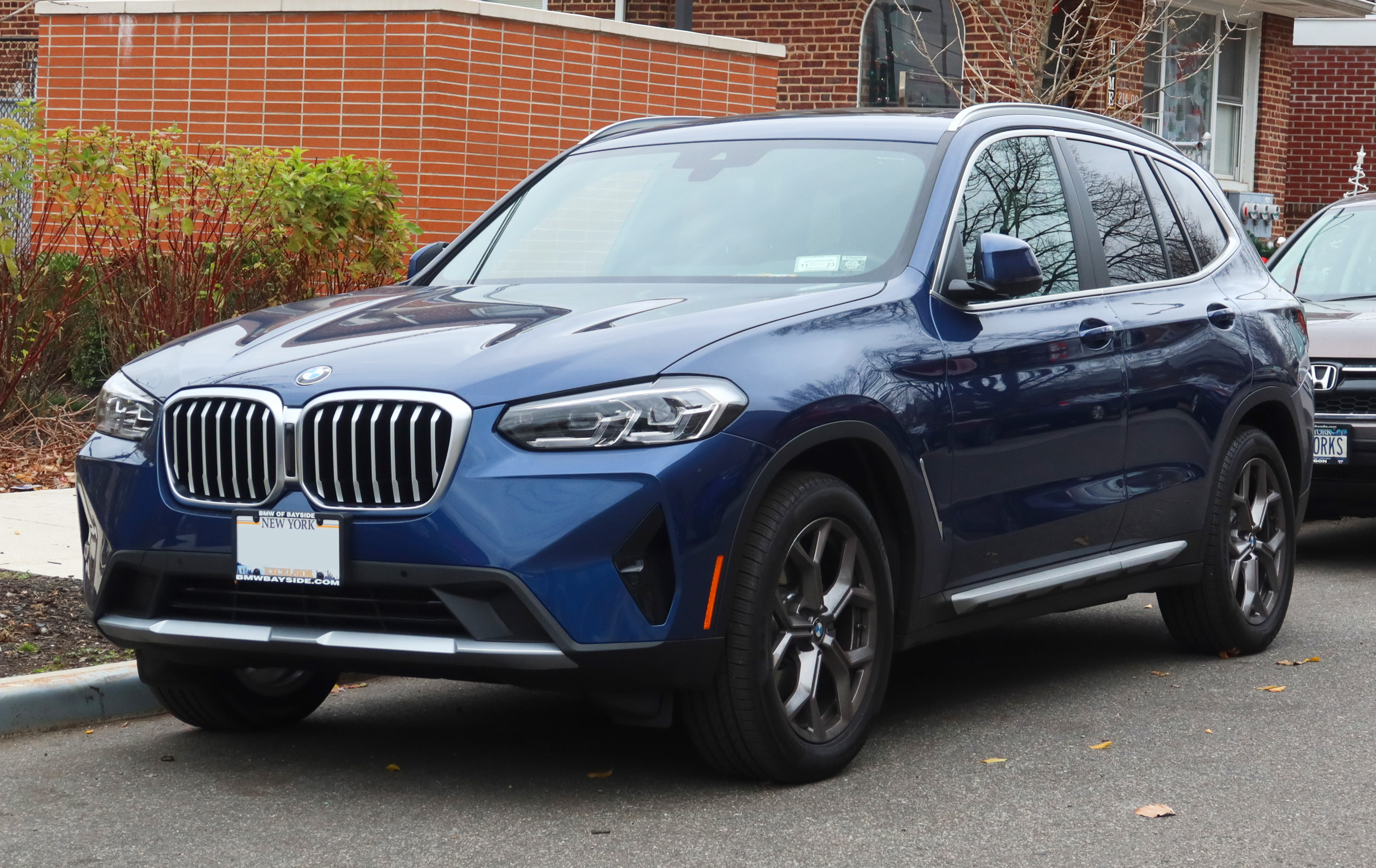
2022 BMW X3 xDrive30i

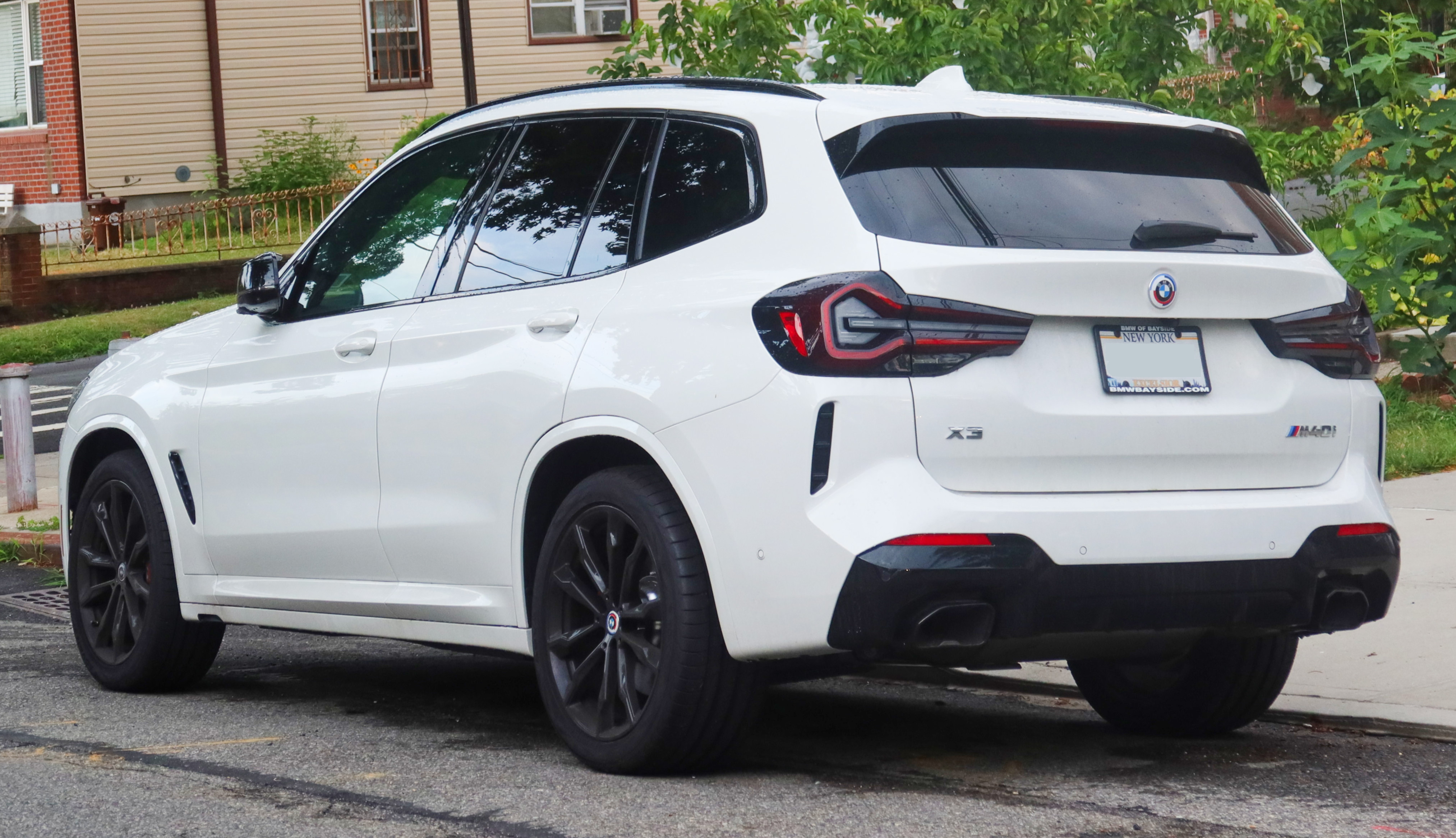
2022 BMW X3 xDriveM40i

=== Alpina XD3 ===
The Alpina XD3 made its debut at the 2018 Geneva Motor Show. The XD3 is fitted with an Alpina-modified version of BMW's B57 diesel inline-six engine. In the quad-turbo left-hand drive version, the engine outputs 285 kW (382 hp) and 770 N⋅m (568 lbf⋅ft), giving a 0–100 km/h (62 mph) time of 4.6 s and a top speed of 266 km/h (165 mph). In the bi-turbo right-hand drive version, the engine outputs 245 kW (329 hp) and 700 N⋅m (516 lbf⋅ft), giving it a 0–100 km/h (62 mph) time of 4.9 s and a top speed of 254 km/h (158 mph).

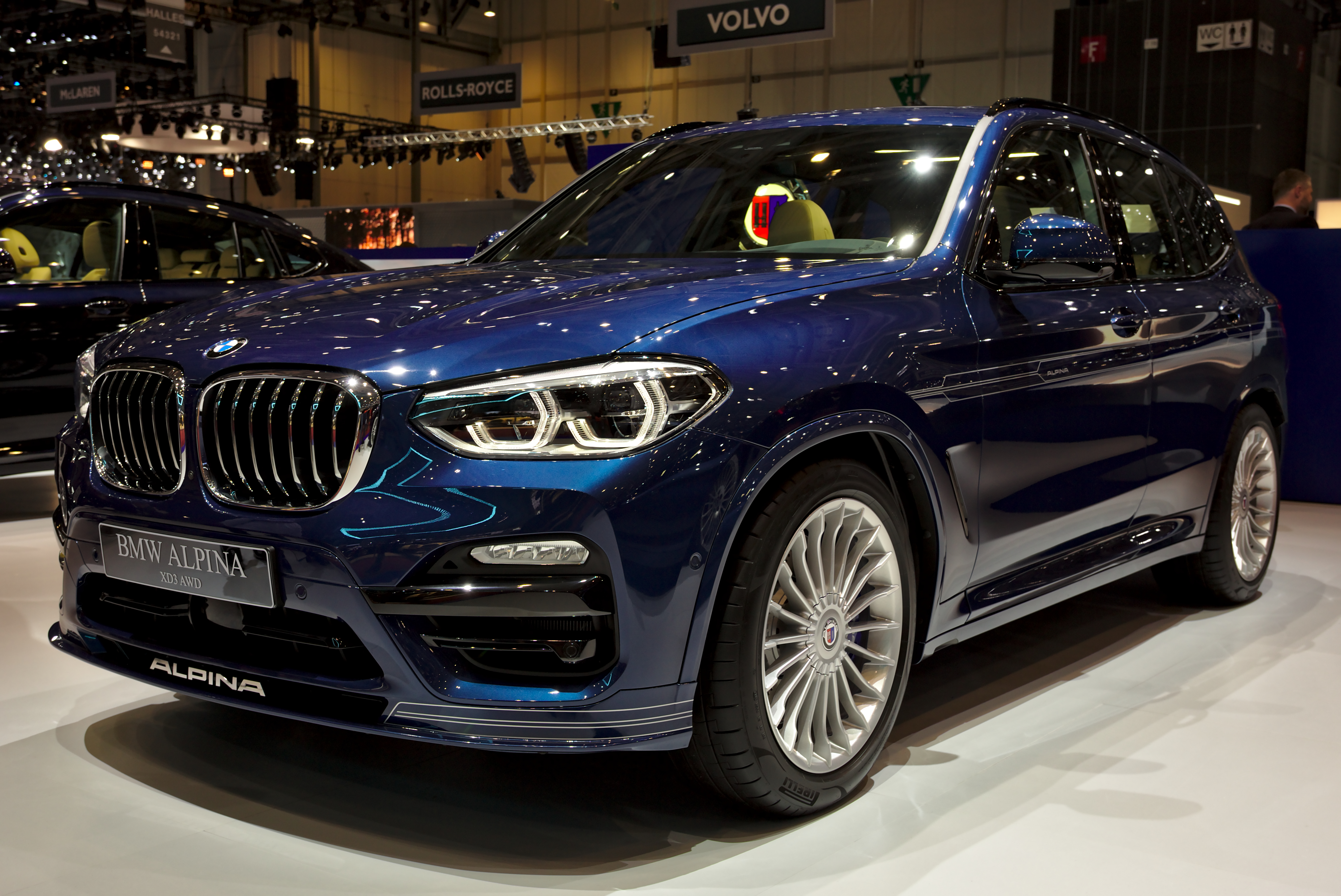
Alpina XD3 at Geneva Motorshow 2018

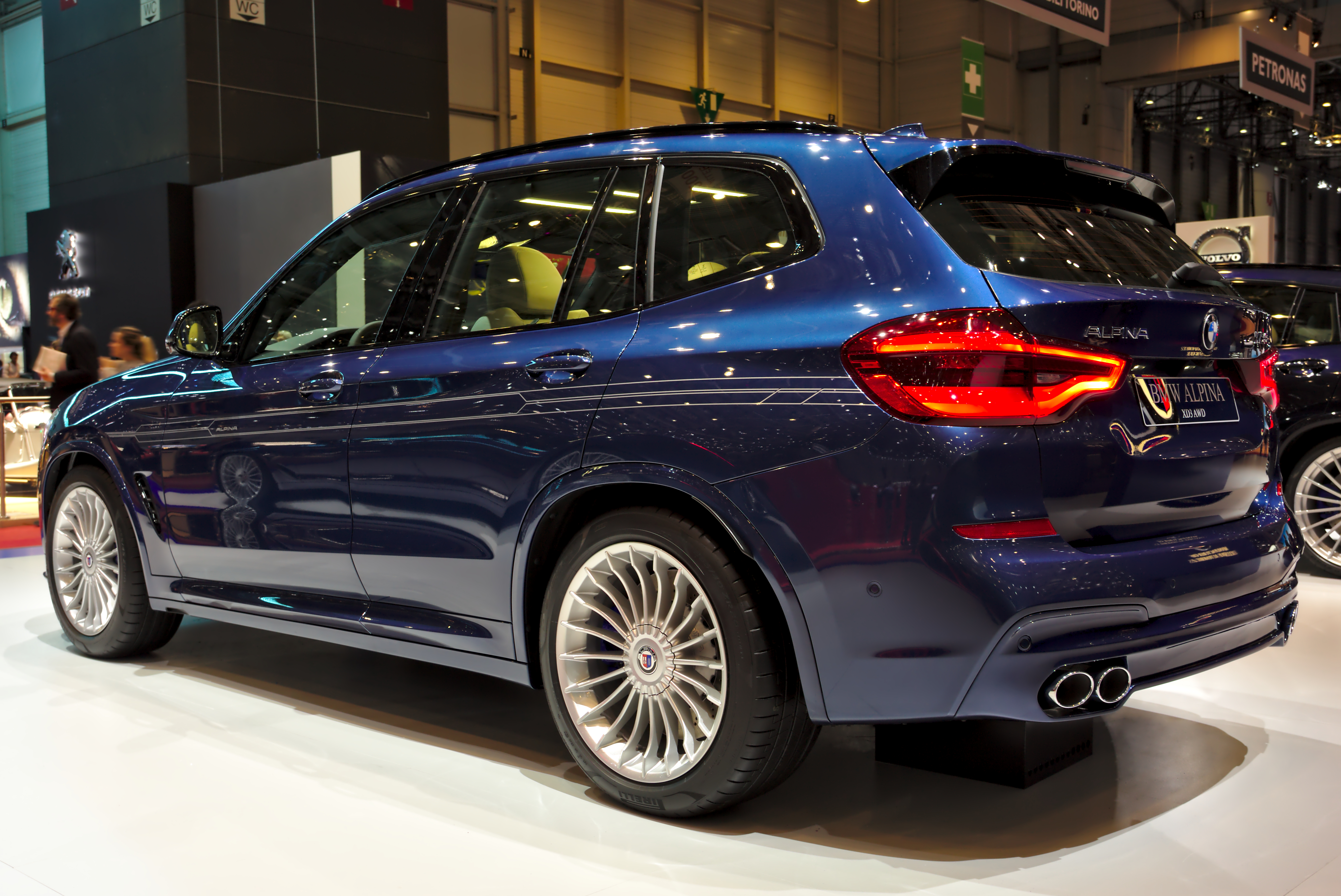
Alpina XD3 at Geneva Motorshow 2018

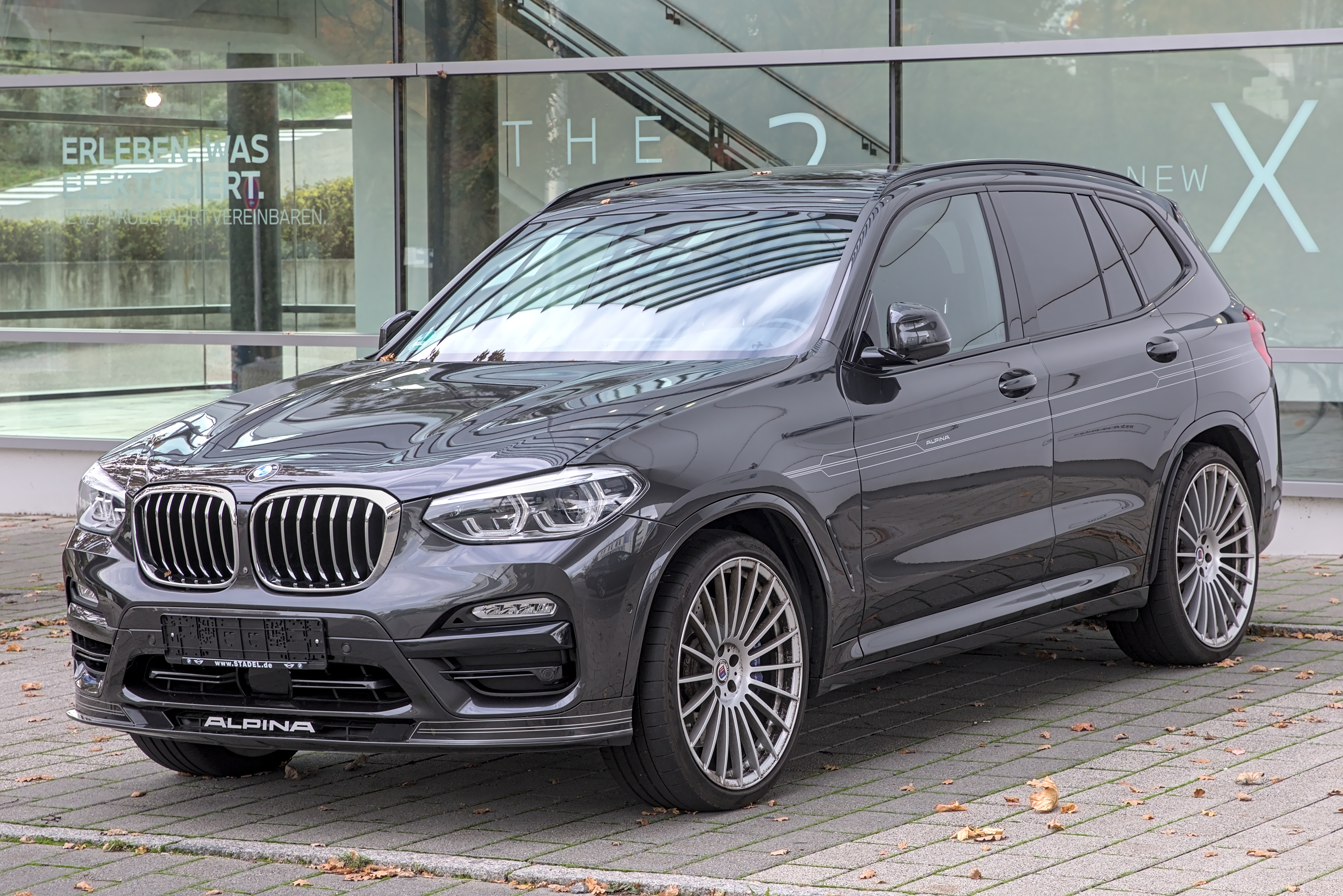
Alpina XD3

=== BMW iX3 (G08; 2020) ===
The BMW iX3 (model code G08) is a battery electric version of the BMW X3 (G01). It was presented at the 2018 Beijing Motor Show in April as a concept vehicle, it is the third car of the electric-focused BMW i family and the first battery electric BMW SUV. Production began in September 2020 at BMW's factory in Dadong, Shenyang, China. It will not be available in Taiwan, United States, and Canada, reportedly due to the vehicle's limited range and sole rear-wheel-drive configuration for the North American market.

The production version of the BMW iX3 was unveiled in July 2020. It has an 80 kWh battery pack with 73.83 kWh usable capacity, which delivers up to 460 km (290 mi) of range based on the WLTP. The iX3 is powered by a single electric motor on the rear axle that produces 210 kW (282 hp) and accelerates from 0–100 km/h (0–62 mph) in 6.8 seconds. It has an electronically limited top speed of 180 km/h (112 mph).

The electric powertrain is BMW's fifth-generation scalable electric drivetrain that is distinguished by a more compact design than that used by the BMW i3 with the electric motor, transmission, and power electrics grouped together in a single component. It does not feature rare-earth materials in its construction and allows BMW to significantly reduce production costs over the old model. The batteries consists of 188 prismatic cells and are positioned on the floor, lowering the centre of gravity by 75 mm. Supported for 150 kW DC fast charging, the iX3 can be charged from 0 to 80 per cent in 34 minutes or 100 kilometres (62 mi) in 10 minutes. It has 510 litres (18 cu ft) of boot space, 40 L (1.4 cu ft) smaller than in a conventional X3.

It features adaptive flat LED headlights, 19-inch bi-colour wheels, three-dimensional LED taillights, it also features a BMW Live Cockpit Professional along with a 12-inch digital display and a 12-inch central touch screen and leather seats.

In 2025, the NA5 iX3 was released as the successor to the G08. It will be sold alongside the gasoline-powered G45 X3.

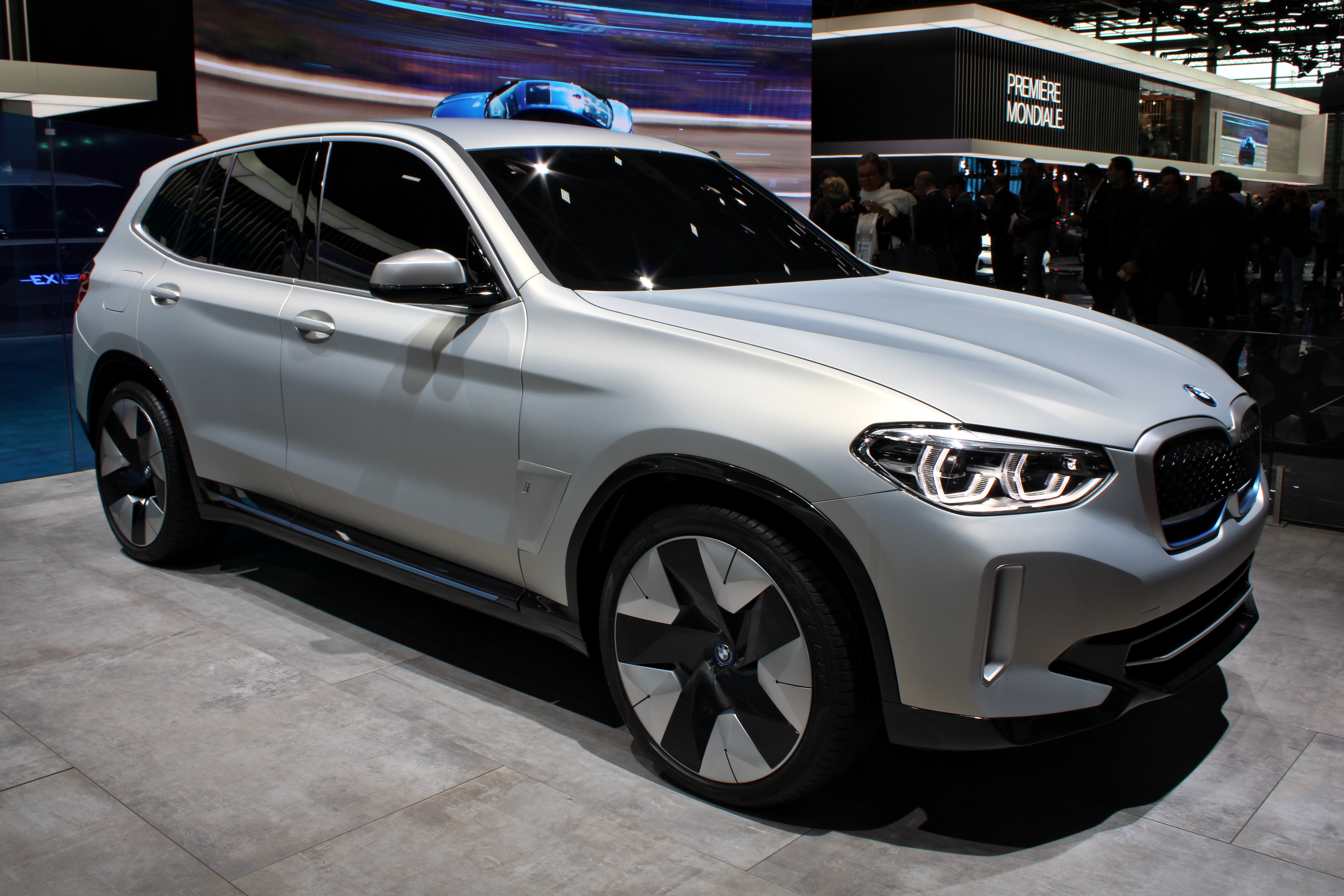
BMW iX3 concept

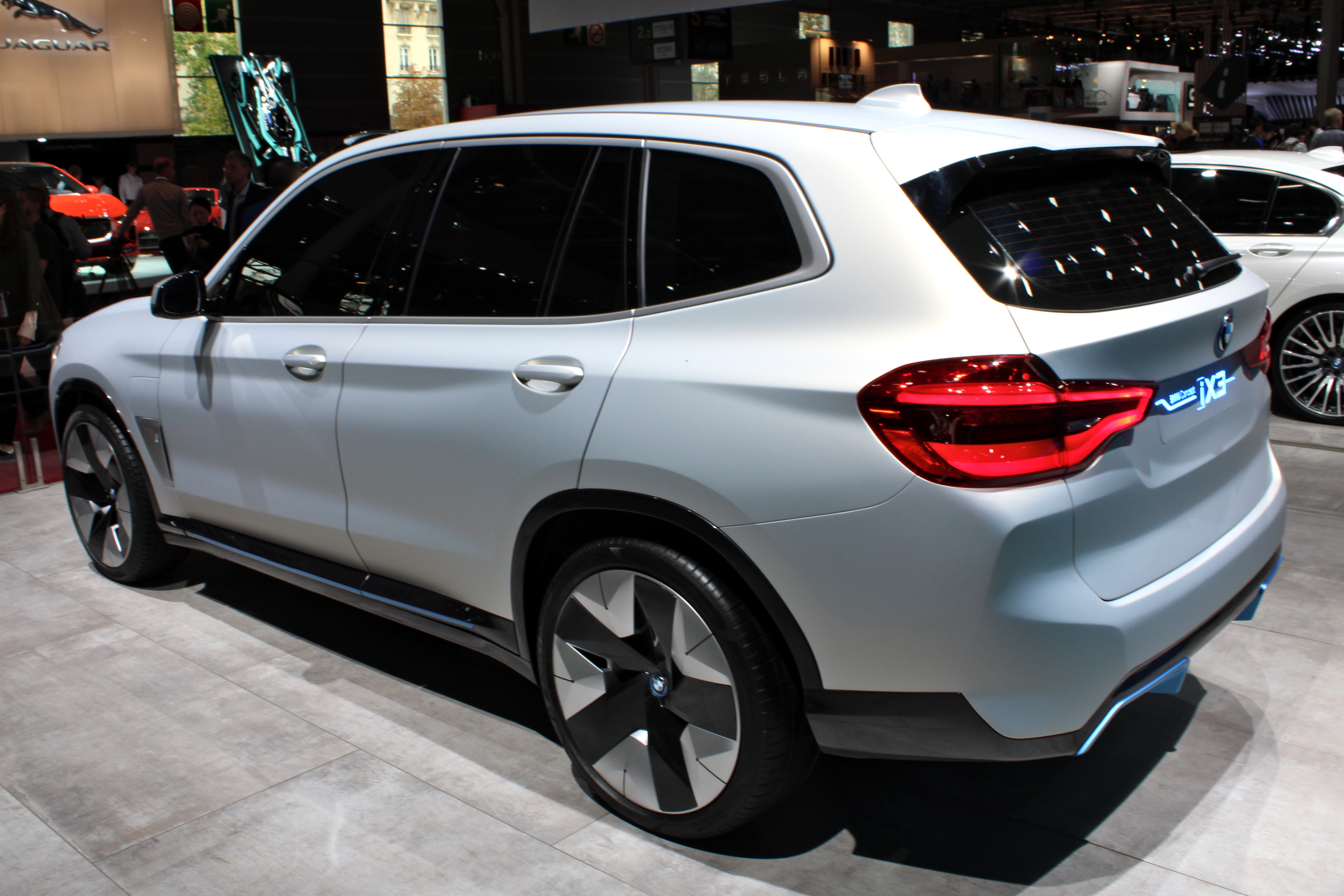
BMW iX3 concept

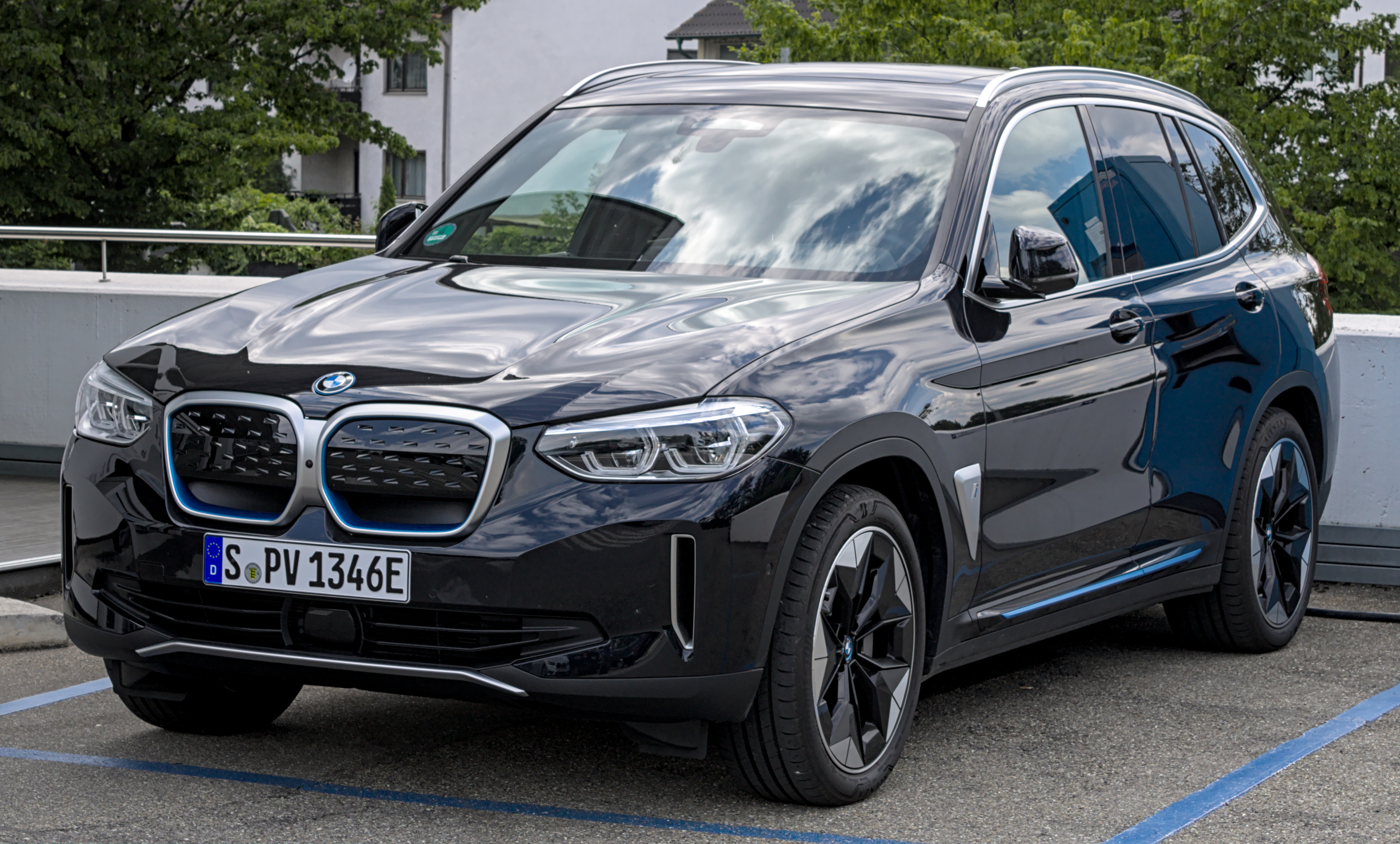
BMW iX3

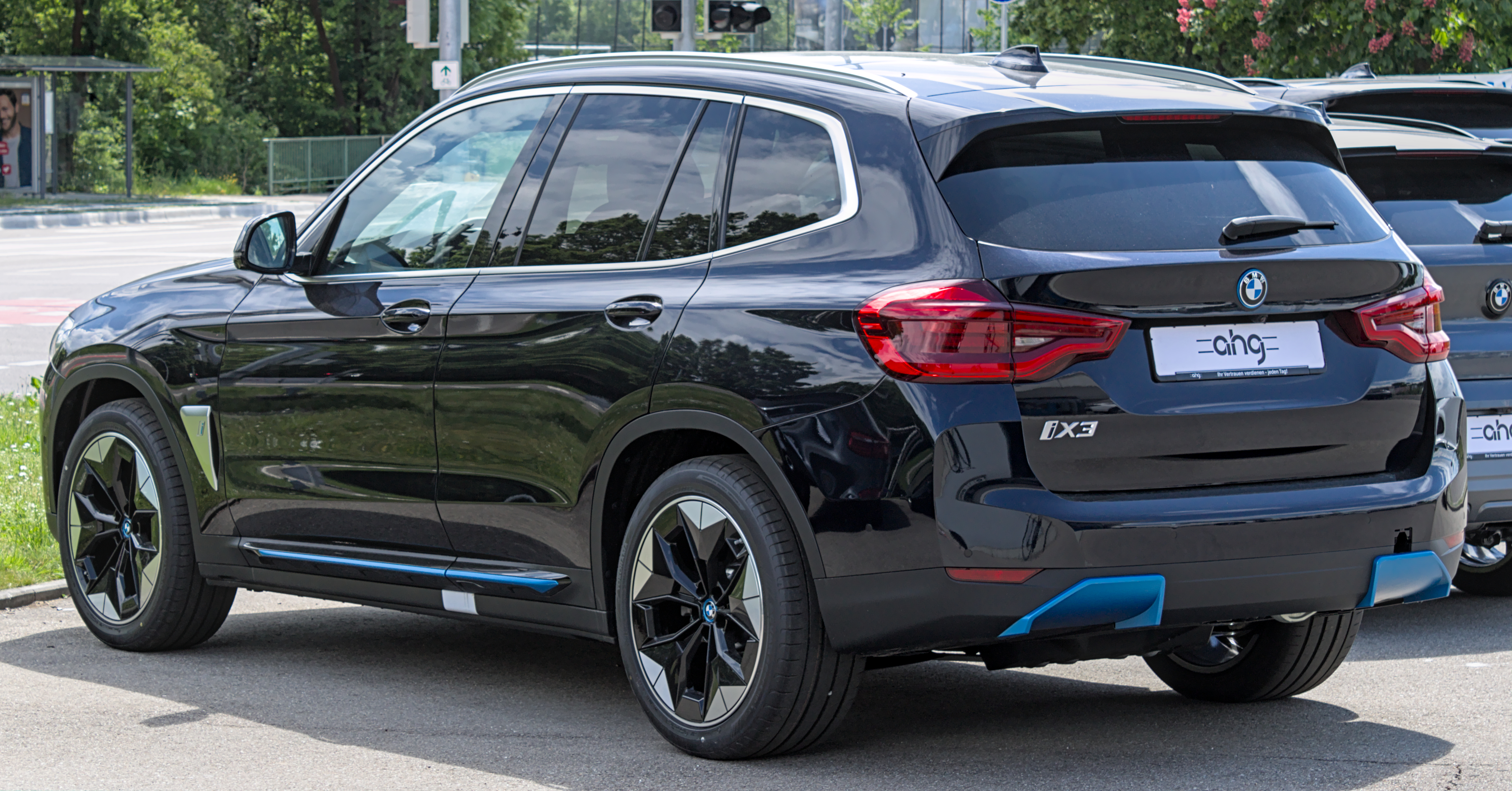
BMW iX3

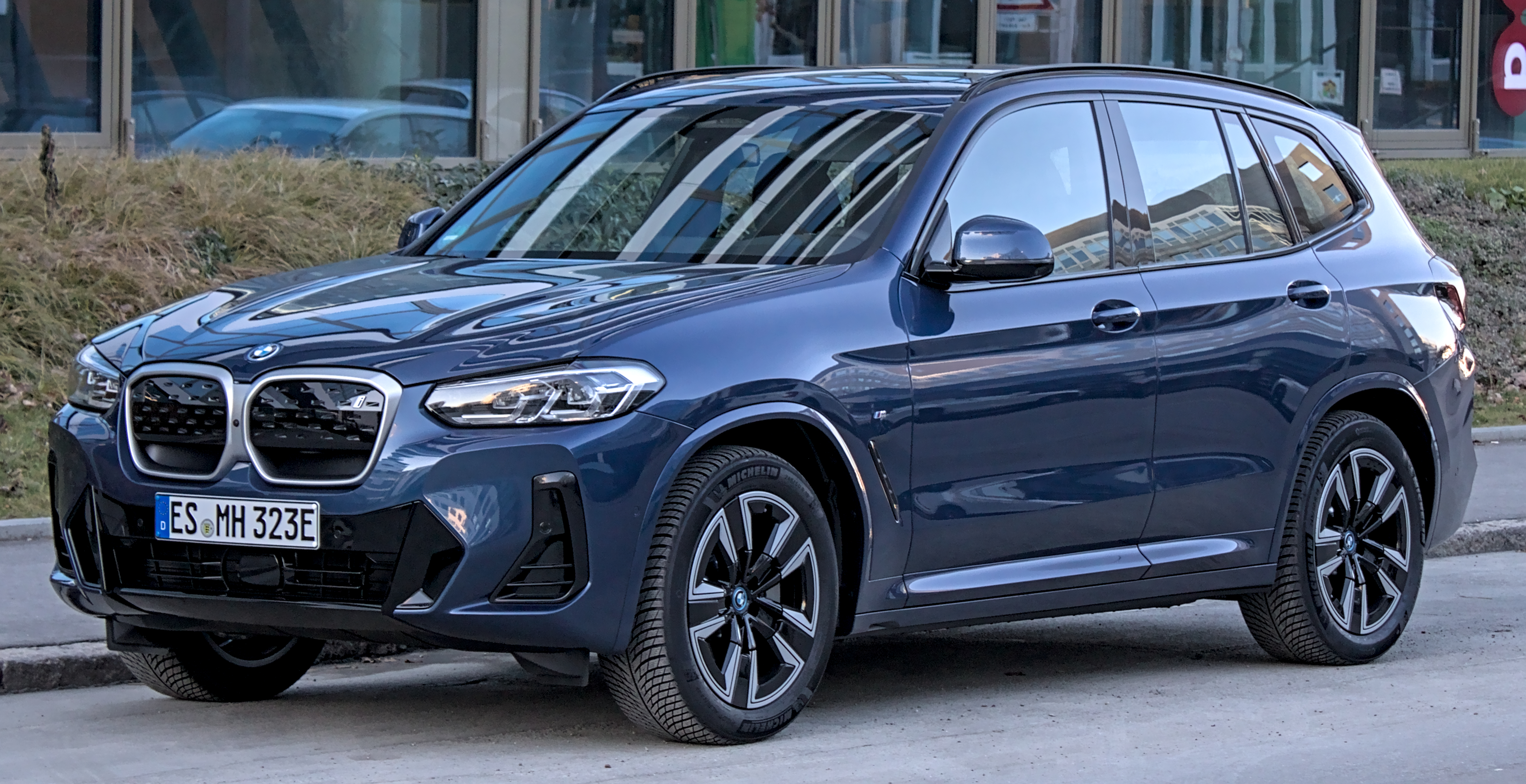
BMW iX3 (facelift)

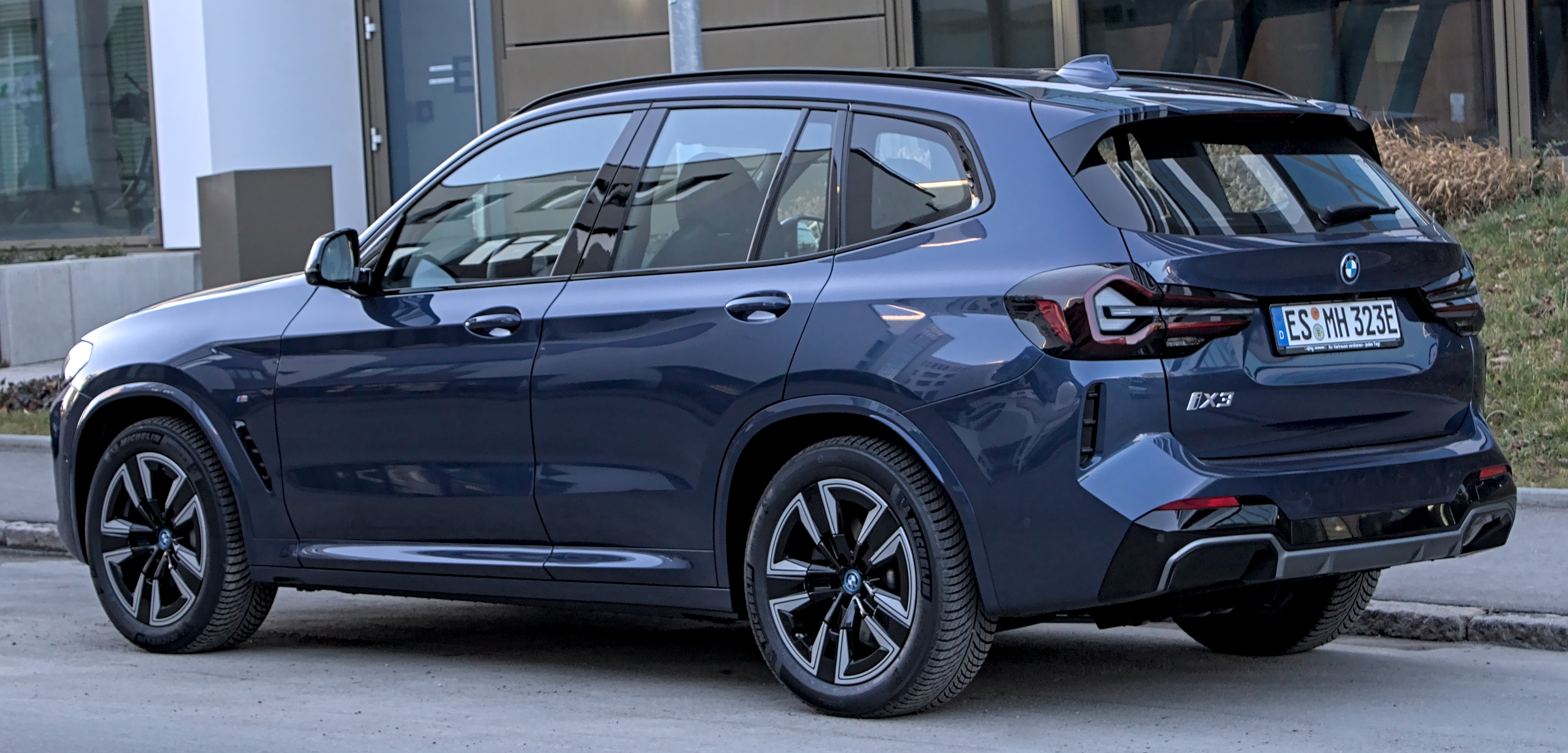
BMW iX3 (facelift)

=== Safety ===
==== ANCAP ====
ANCAP test results* BMW X3 variants except xDrive30e (2017, aligned with Euro NCAP)
Test	Points	%
Overall:	5 /5 stars	
Adult occupant:	35.4	93%
Child occupant:	41.2	84%
Pedestrian:	29.4	70%
Safety assist:	7.0	58%

ANCAP test results* BMW iX3 variants except xDrive30e (2017)
Test	Score
Overall	5 /5 stars
Frontal offset	
Side impact	
Pole	
Seat belt reminders	
Whiplash protection	
Pedestrian protection	
Electronic stability control	

==== IIHS ====
IIHS scores (2018 model year)
Small overlap front (driver)	Good		
Small overlap front (passenger)	Good		
Moderate overlap front (original test)	Good		
Side (original test)	Good		
Roof strength	Good		
Head restraints and seats	Good		
Headlights	Good	Marginal	
Front crash prevention: vehicle-to-vehicle	Superior		Optional
Child restraint LATCH ease of use	Marginal		

== Fourth generation (G45/NA5; 2024/2025) ==
The fourth-generation X3 G45 was unveiled on 19 June 2024, with sales commenced in late 2024 for the 2025 model year in the North American and European markets.

For the first time in the model history, the X3 is available with a long wheelbase (LWB) version, codenamed G48, exclusive for the Chinese market.

Unlike the previous model, BMW confirmed that the flagship M high-performance model will not be produced for the X3 G45, therefore the M Performance M50 model served as the highest performance internal combustion model of the X3 G45. BMW instead focused on developing the M model of the battery-electric powered iX3.

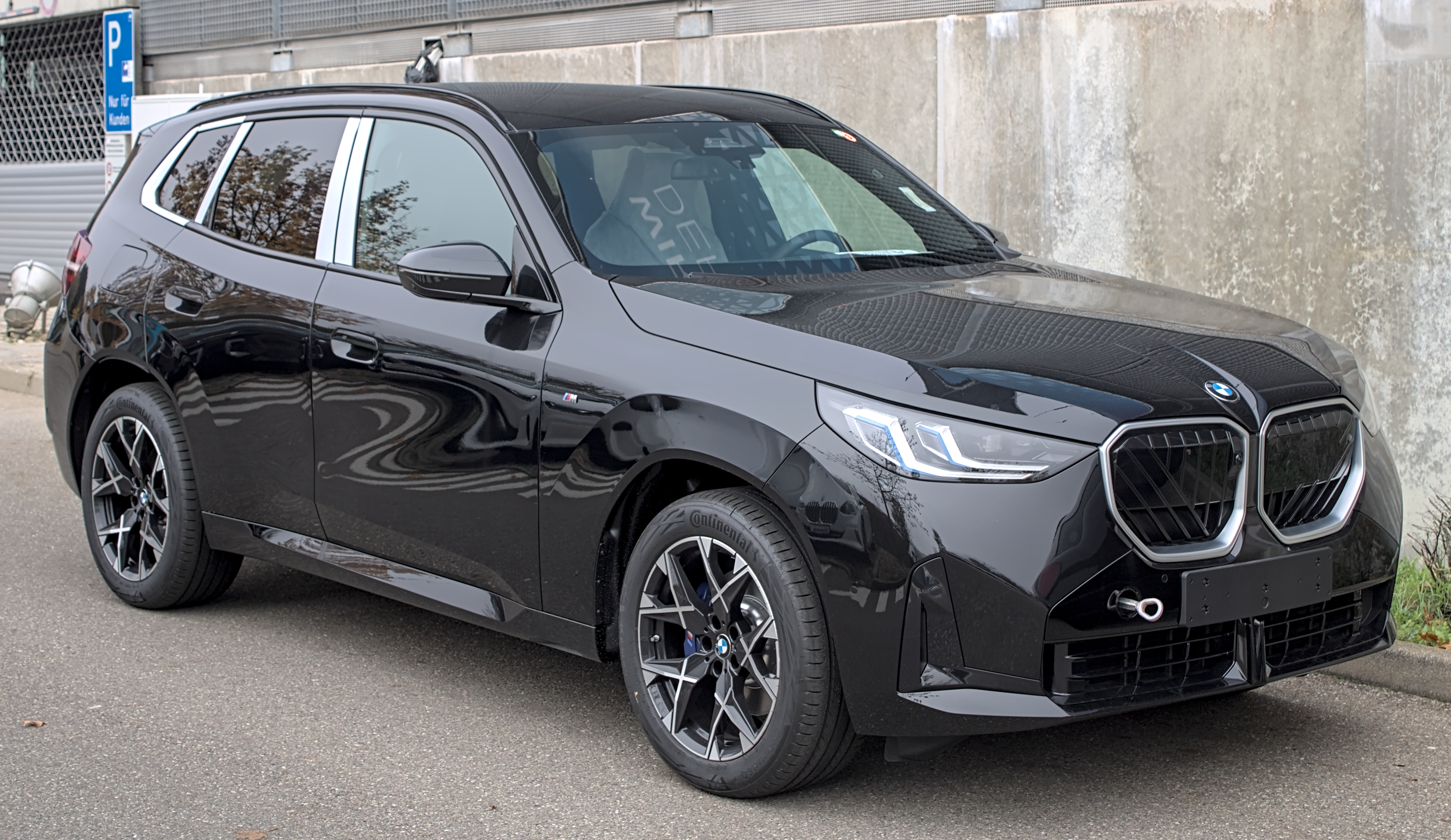
2025 BMW X3 20 (G45)

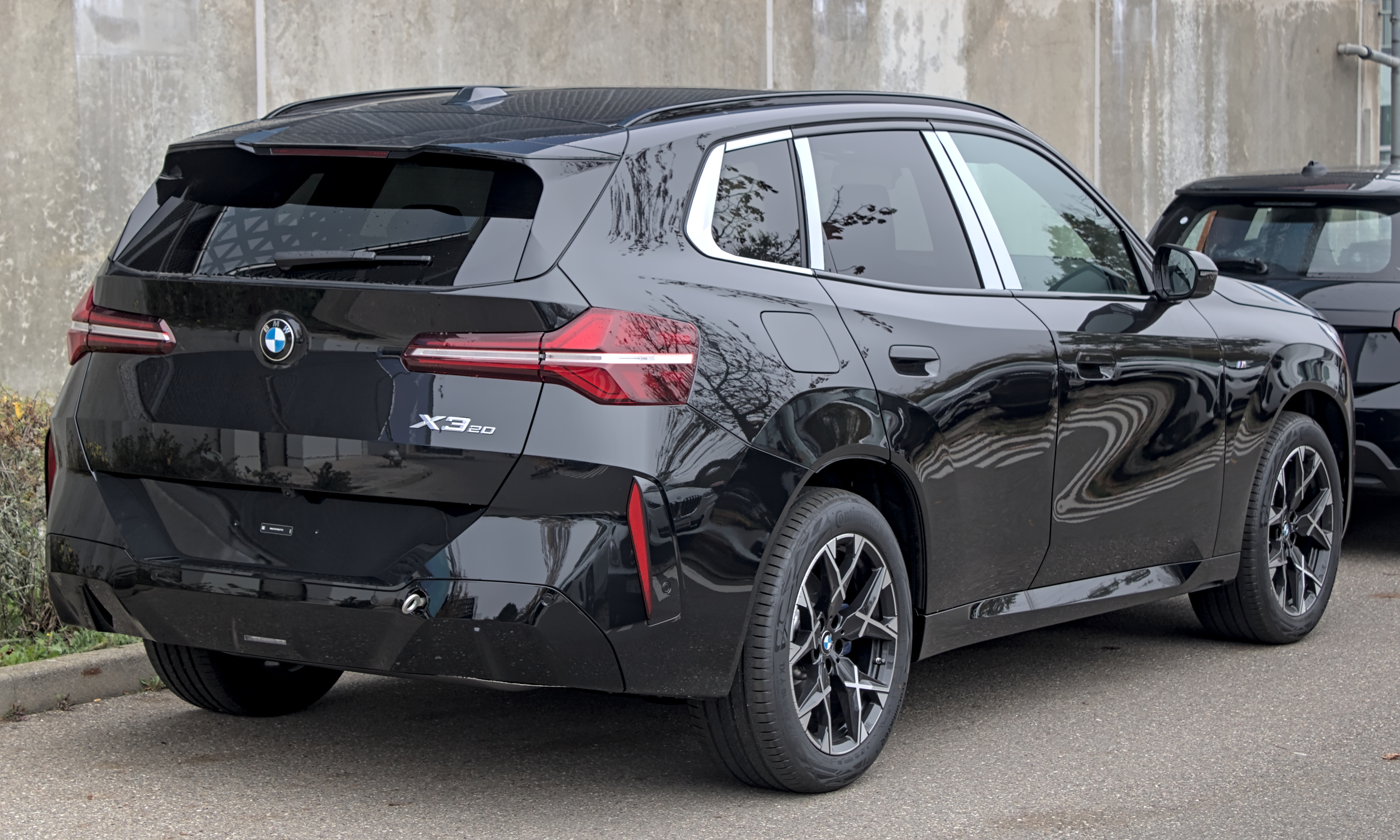
Rear view

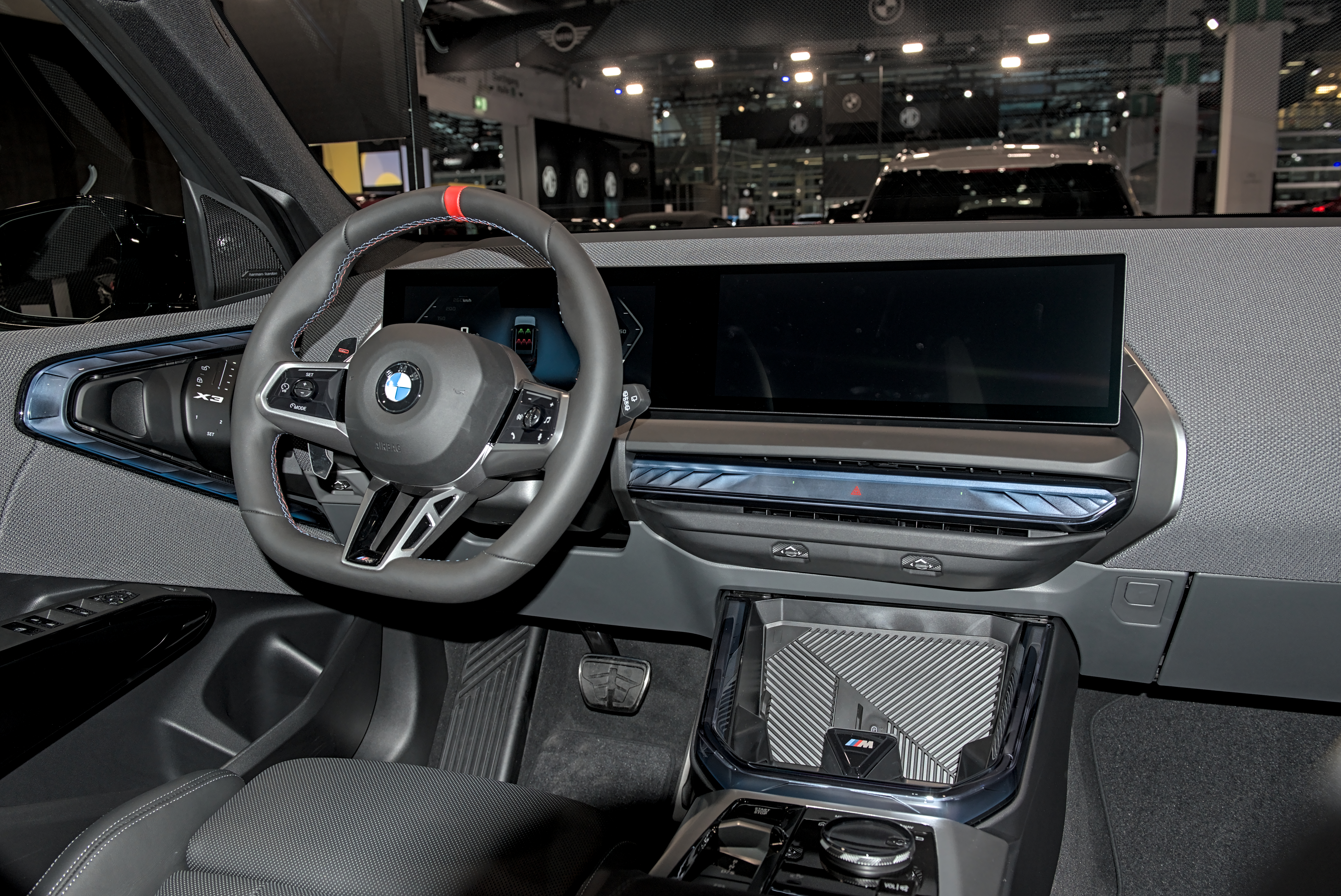
Interior

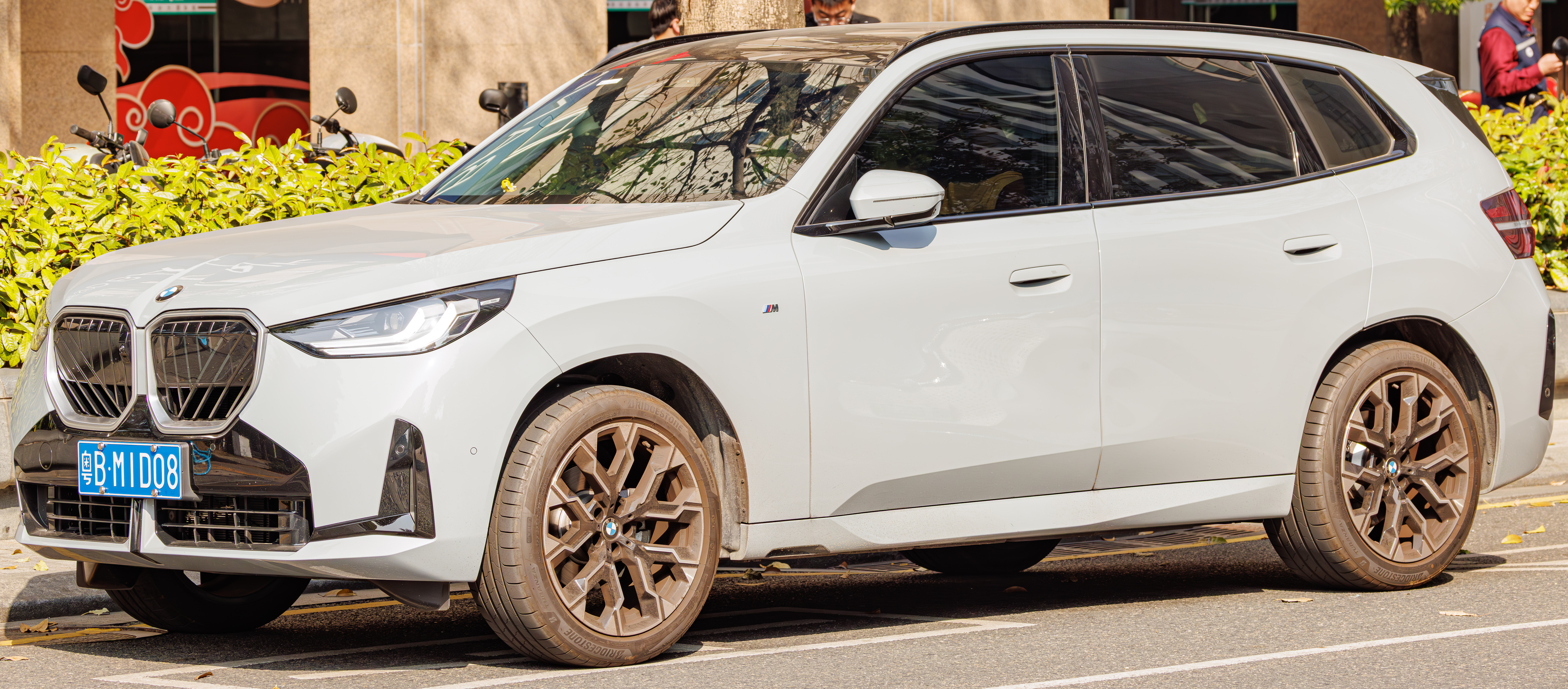
G48 (LWB)

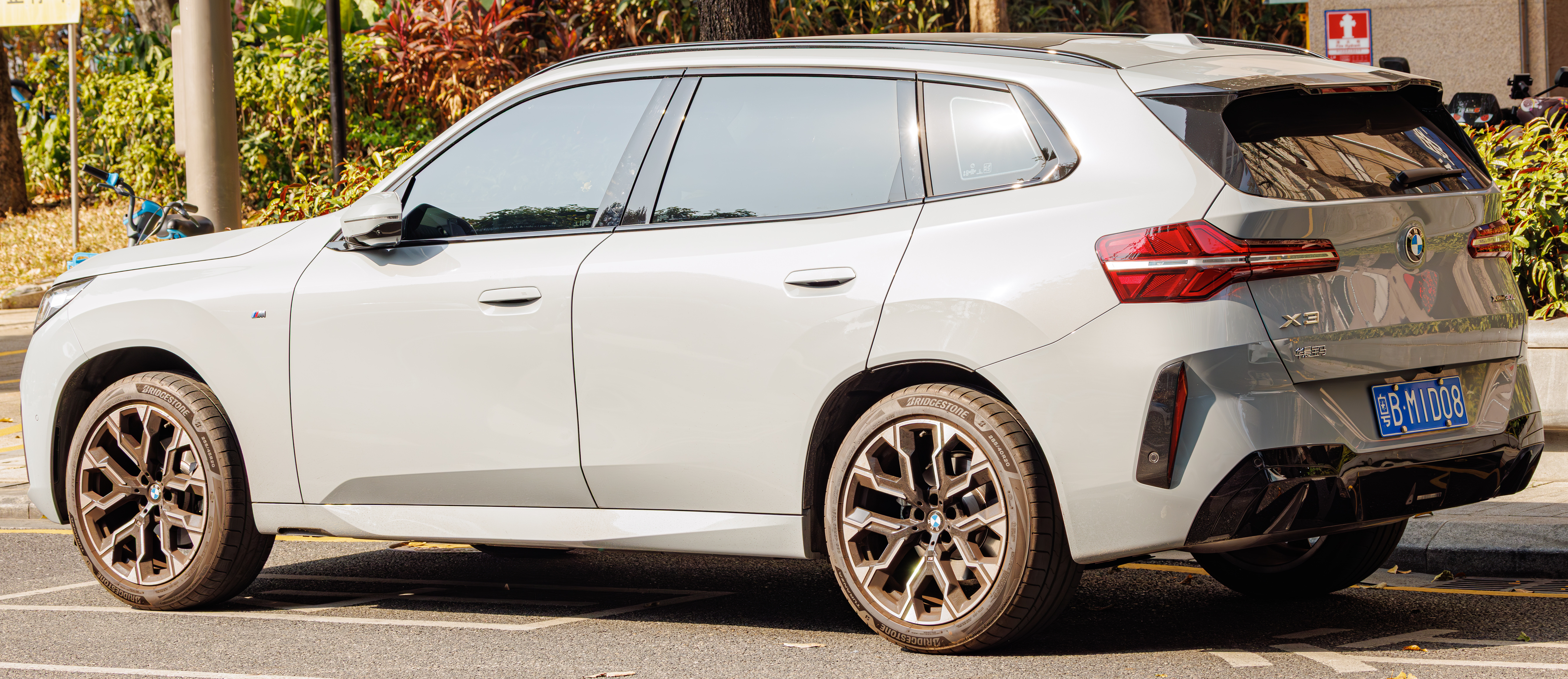
Rear view

== Production and sales ==
On 18 June 2008, the 500,000th X3 was produced in Graz.

Calendar year	Total production	US sales	China sales		
Calendar year	Total production	US sales	X3	X3M	iX3
2004	92,248	34,604			—
2005	110,719	30,769			—
2006	114,000	31,291			—
2007	111,879	28,058			—
2008	84,440	17,622			—
2009	55,634	6,067			—
2010	46,004	6,075			—
2011	117,944	27,793			—
2012	149,853	35,173			—
2013	157,303	30,623			—
2014	150,915	33,824			—
2015	137,810	31,924			—
2016	157,017	44,196			—
2017	146,395	40,691			—
2018	201,637	61,351	37,722		—
2019	316,883	70,110	121,500		—
2020	292,328	59,777	135,694		857
2021	N/A (Note: Starting in 2021, BMW Group combined total deliveries of the X3 and X4 in its annual report.)	75,858	128,961		22,446
2022	N/A	65,799	117,230		29,213
2023	N/A	63,172	118,203	354	39,640
2024	N/A	68,798	111,169	164	26,197
2025	N/A	76,546	73,738	151	7,791

== See also ==
- List of BMW vehicles
