= BMW X5 (E70) =

Second generation of the BMW X5

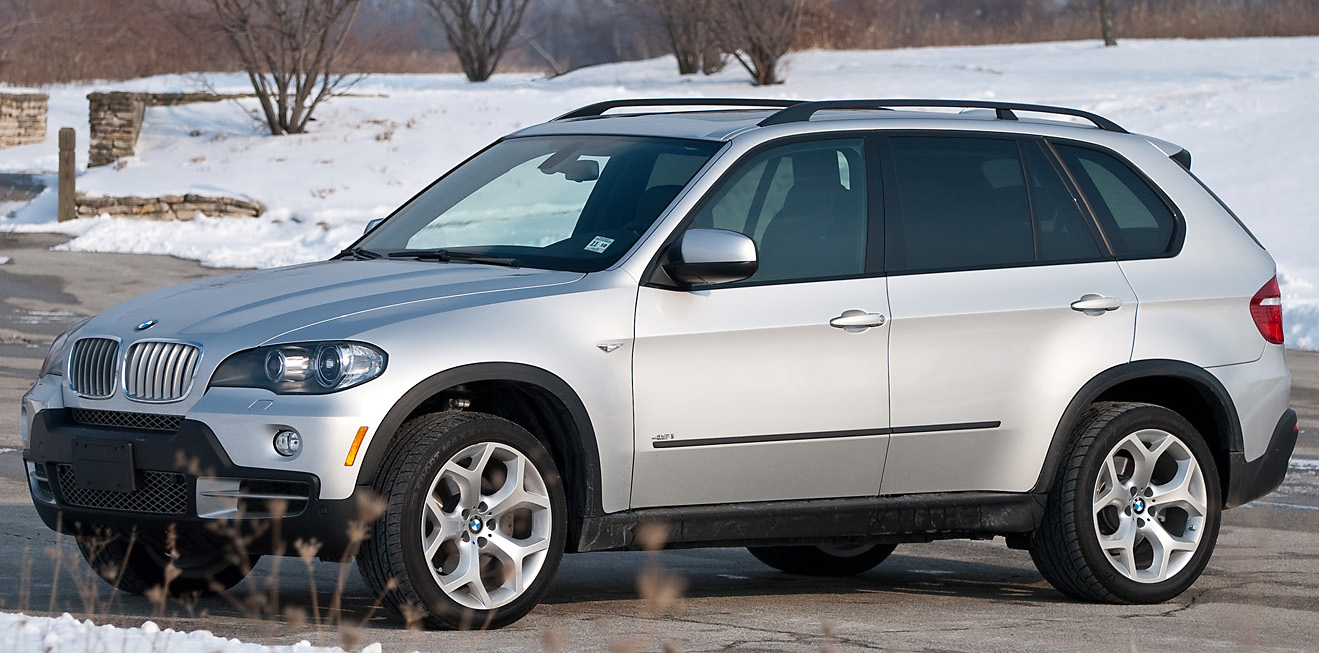

Overview
- Manufacturer: BMW
- Model code: E70
- Production: 7 July 2006 – 28 July 2013
- Model years: 2007–2014
- Assembly: United States: Greer, South Carolina (BMW America); Mexico: Toluca (BMW Mexico); Russia: Kaliningrad (Avtotor)
- Designer: Pierre Leclercq (2003)

Body and chassis
- Class: Mid-size luxury crossover SUV
- Body style: 5-door SUV
- Platform: BMW L4
- Related: BMW 5 Series (E60); BMW X6 (E71)

Powertrain
- Engine: Petrol; 3.0 L N52/N55 I6; 4.4 L N63/S63 V8; 4.8 L N62 V8; Diesel: 3.0 L M57/N57 I6
- Transmission: 6-speed automatic with Steptronic ZF 6HP 26 or ZF 6HP 26X; 8-speed ZF 8HP 45 or ZF 8HP 70 automatic

Dimensions
- Wheelbase: 2,933 mm (115.5 in)
- Length: 4,854 mm (191.1 in); M: 4,851 mm (191.0 in)
- Width: 1,933 mm (76.1 in); M: 1,994 mm (78.5 in)
- Height: 2007–2008: 1,766 mm (69.5 in); 2009–2013: 1,776 mm (69.9 in); M: 1,764 mm (69.4 in)

Chronology
- Predecessor: BMW X5 (E53)
- Successor: BMW X5 (F15)

The BMW E70 is the second-generation BMW X5 mid-size luxury crossover SUV. It replaced the BMW X5 (E53) in July 2006. It was manufactured alongside the BMW X6 at BMW's Greer, South Carolina plant in the U.S. and BMW's facility in Toluca, Mexico.

== Design ==
The E70 BMW X5 was 60 mm (2.4 in) wider, 165 mm (6.5 in) longer; with a 110 mm (4.3 in) longer wheelbase, but remains at the height of the E53 X5 at 1,766 mm (69.5 in).

== Technology ==
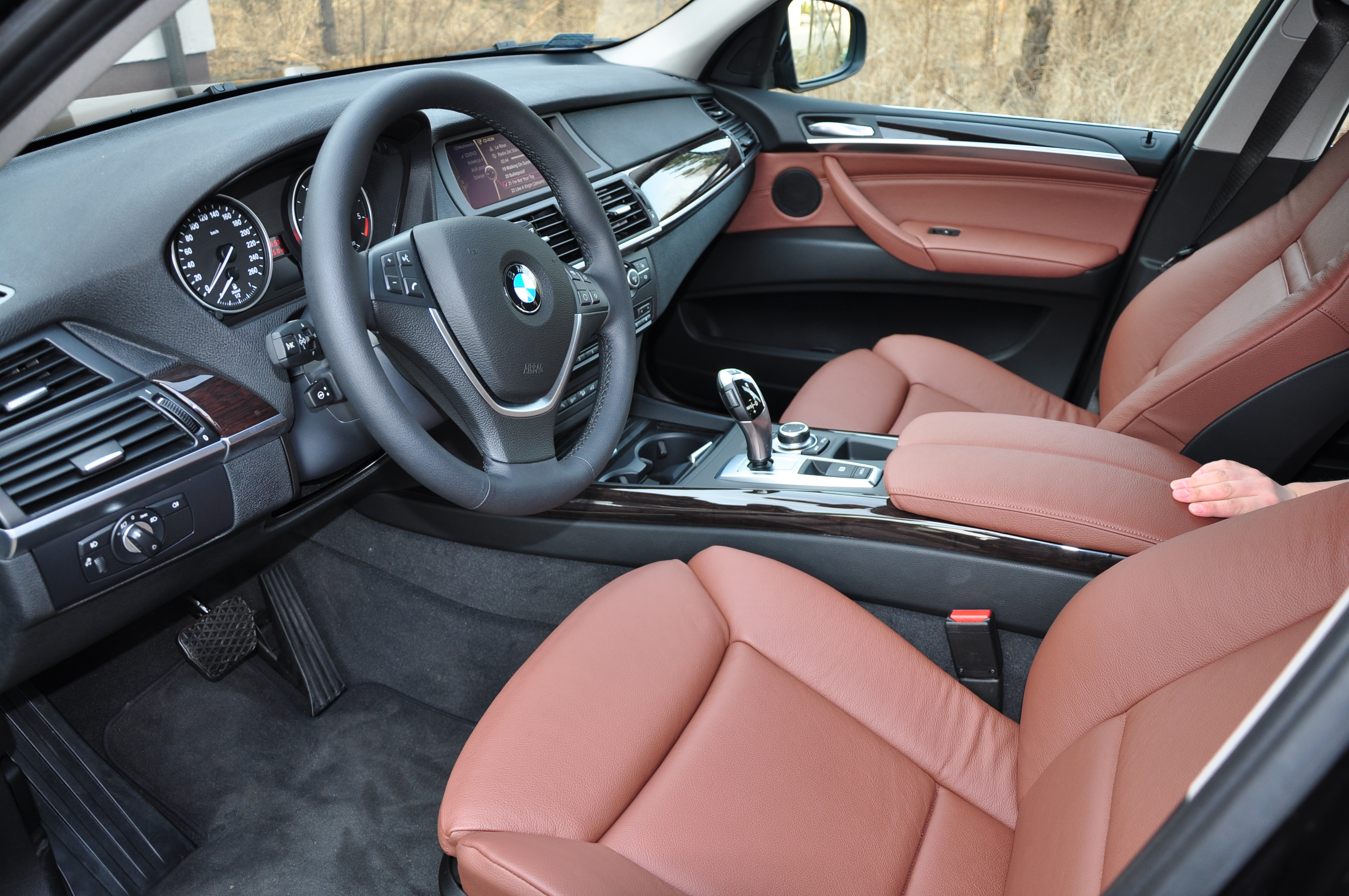
Interior

The xDrive AWD system updates previewed in the facelifted X5 have continued with further detail improvements for the E70. It uses a double wishbone suspension at the front. The manual transmission is entirely dropped, leaving only the automatic transmission.

The E70 features many new technological advancements for this class as standard equipment including BMW's iDrive system, electronic 'joystick' gearshift (no mechanical connection to the gearbox to save space in the console), LED taillamps, the first ever all-polypropylene single module fender module, and options such as heads-up display (HUD), active steering, active damping, and Dynamic Drive which uses active anti-roll bars employing a hydraulic servo in the middle to actively counteract body roll. The X5 has a rollover risk of 17.4%.

The interior of the X5 is completely new. It has a large center-mounted display screen and the simplified iDrive, a man-machine interface system also found in the rest of the BMW model range. The E70 further incorporates many comfort options such as a glass panorama-roof, and, for the first time in a BMW, an optional third row seat which has increased the seating capacity in E70 to 7 passengers, addressing criticism of the E53 model which had been regarded as being slightly too small for this market segment.

The E70 is also the first production vehicle to use FlexRay, a new extremely fast electrical bus system; it is only used for the control of the chassis damping system. The new 'joy-stick'-style electronic space-saving shifter has since been adopted in the new 2007 BMW 5 Series.

For the 2010 model year the X5 received the new iDrive system and the BMW individual audio system along with various other minor updates.

Technical features which other BMW models use also:

- Active steering- changes the steering ratio depending on the speed and driving style
- Adaptive Drive with Active Roll Stabilization and adaptive shock absorbers
- Head-up display - critical information projected onto the windshield
- Comfort Access - keyless access and engine start
- Daytime running lights on the "Corona Rings" around the main headlight units
- Four-zone climate control

New is the Park Distance system that can be integrated into the image of the optional rearview camera.

During the Volkswagen emissions violations, an X5 diesel was used as an example of a compliant vehicle.

== BMW X5 M (2010–2013) ==
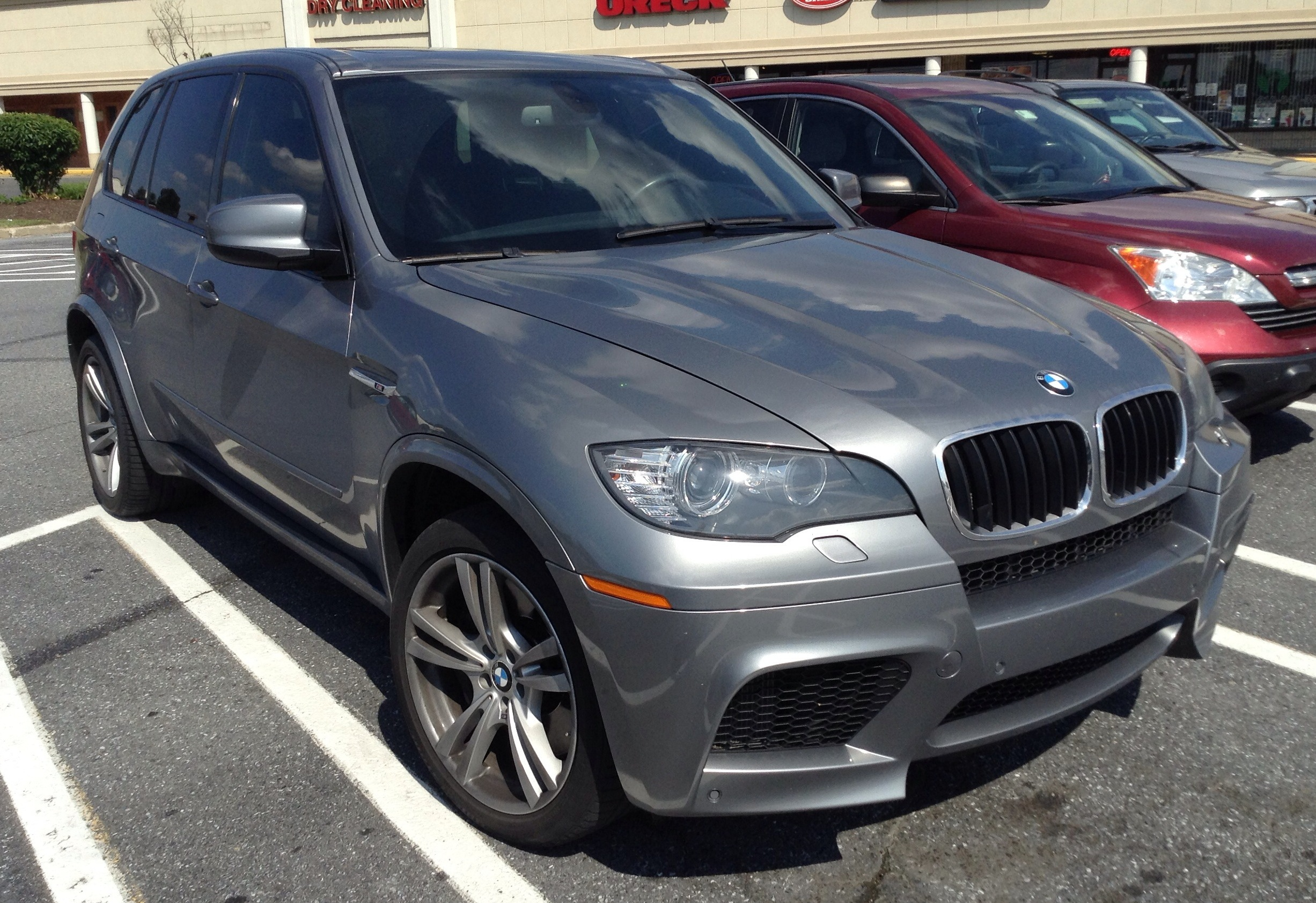
BMW X5 M

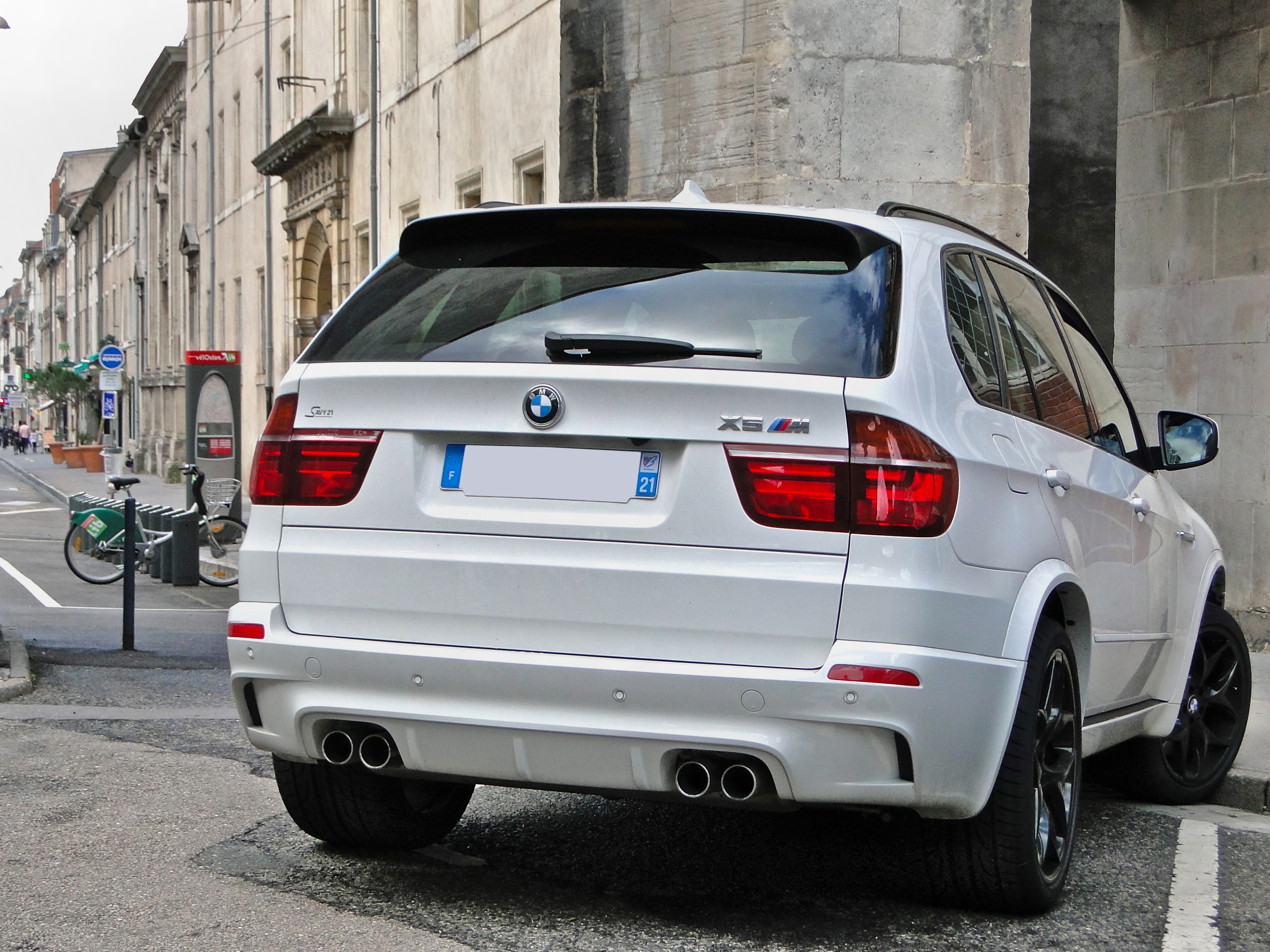
BMW X5 M

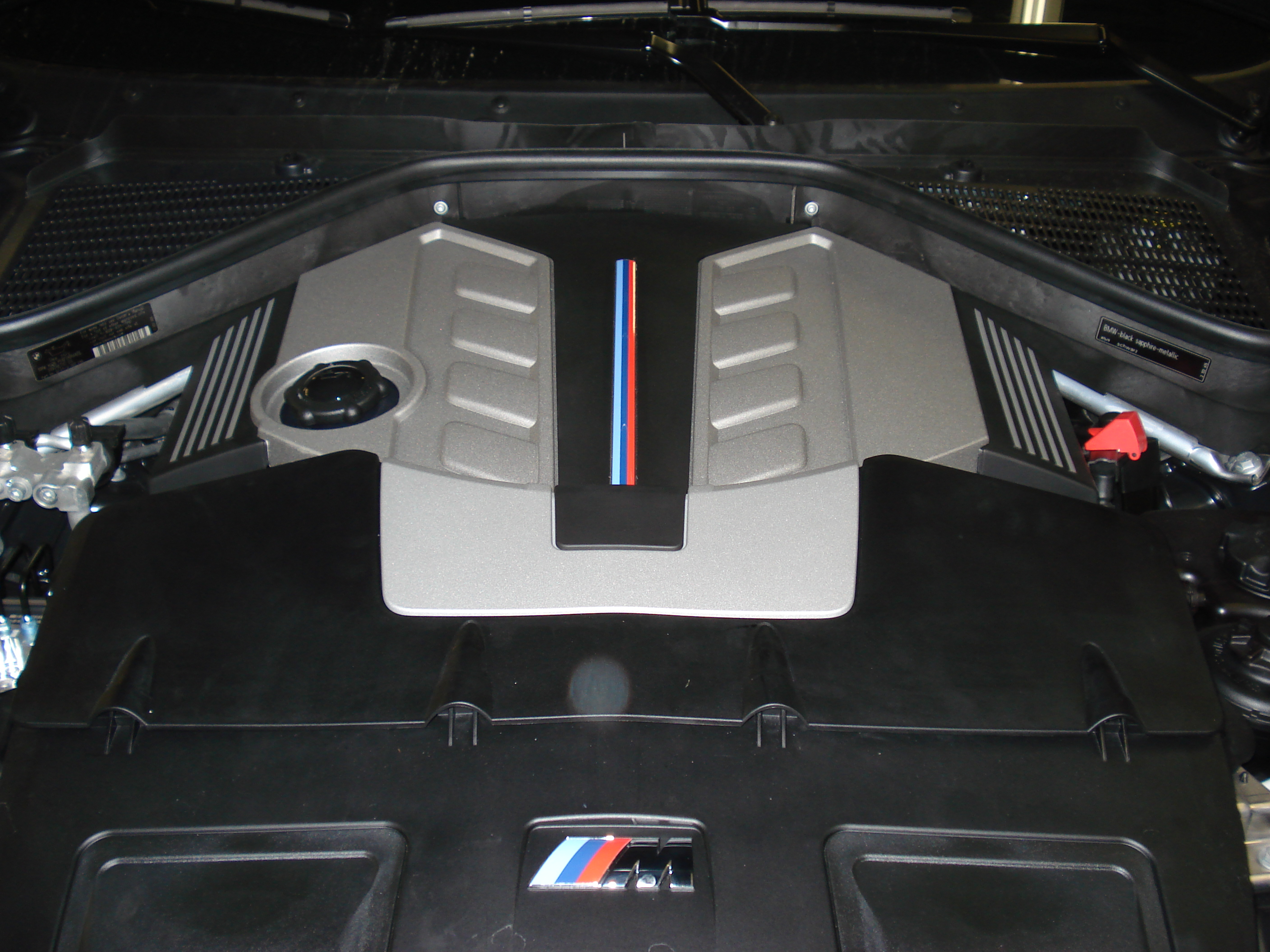
BMW X5 M S63 Engine

The BMW X5 M is a high-performance derivative of the X5. It was introduced to the press at the New York Auto Show in April 2009 and started appearing in BMW dealerships in September 2009, for the 2010 model year. It competes with cars such as the Mercedes-Benz ML63 AMG, the Porsche Cayenne Turbo S, and the Jeep Grand Cherokee SRT8.

The BMW X5 M is the first xDrive all-wheel-drive vehicle from M GmbH along with the X6 M. The M offers the same utility as the regular X5, with the addition of the V8 M TwinPower Turbo, a twin-turbocharged 4.4-liter V8 delivering 547 bhp (408 kW; 555 PS) at 5,750 rpm and peak torque of 501.2 lb⋅ft (680 N⋅m), available between 1,500 and 5,650 rpm. The S63 engine is a high output variation of the N63 power unit.

The X5 M can sprint from a standstill to 60 mph (97 km/h) in 4.0 seconds, and a quarter-mile (402 m) time of 12.5 seconds with a trap speed of 112 mph (180.2 km/h) was recorded by Car and Driver magazine. In the same test, the X5 M bested the 0–60 mph (97 km/h) and quarter-mile times of the 2009 Porsche Cayenne Turbo S, the 2009 Jeep Grand Cherokee SRT-8, and the 2010 Range Rover Sport Supercharged. In wet conditions, the X5 M went around the Top Gear Test Track in 1:28.2, 5.1 seconds faster than the Audi Q7 V12 TDI.

Coupled with special suspension specifically optimized for M that features Adaptive Drive and the newly developed M Servotronic power steering, the performance Sport Activity Vehicle promises very competent handling. Other high-tech features include launch control for maximum acceleration and a six-speed M Sport automatic transmission optimized for performance. Drivers can manually select gears using either paddles or an electronic gear selector lever. Electronically controlled, variable power distribution to the front and rear axle prevents the tendency to oversteer or understeer, before DSC Dynamic Stability Control is required to cut in.

The BMW X5 M features the biggest brakes on a BMW production vehicle, with 15.55-inch (395 mm × 36 mm) rotors up front clamped by four-piston calipers, and 15.2-inch (385 mm × 24 mm) rotors at the rear with single-piston calipers. Although traction control is standard, the M Dynamic Mode (MDM) reduces the effect of the system, allowing some wheelspin and drift-type cornering.

For the 2013 model lineup, BMW introduced the M Performance Package available for the xDrive35i and xDrive50i. The M Performance Package models have nearly identical features to the X5 M (sport suspension, wider fenders, staggered wheels, etc.) excluding the quad-tip exhaust, headlights, and engines. The M Performance Package also bumped up the engine output for both models - an additional 15 hp (11 kW) for the xDrive35i and 40 hp (30 kW) for the xDrive50i (torque was also increased by 30 lb-ft for both).

M Performance Parts were available for the X5 M. These include black kidney grilles, steel pedals, a sport steering wheel and M rims.

== Model lineup ==
=== Engines ===
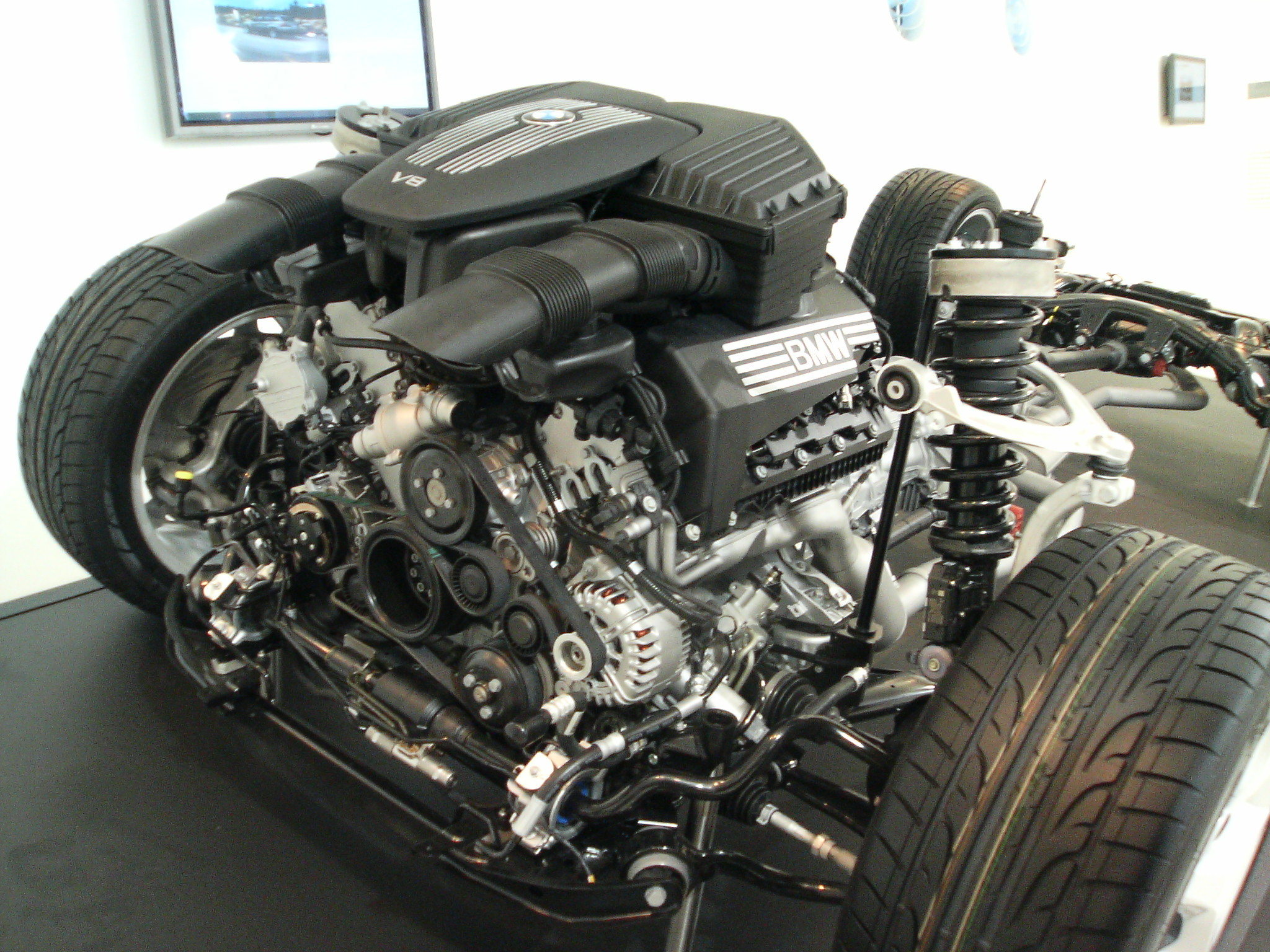
BMW X5 V8 engine

==== Petrol engines ====
Model	Years	Engine code	Power	Torque
3.0si	2007–2008	N52B30	272 PS (200 kW; 268 hp) at 6,650	315 N⋅m (232 lb⋅ft) at 2,750
xDrive30i	2009–2010	N52B30	272 PS (200 kW; 268 hp) at 6,650	315 N⋅m (232 lb⋅ft) at 2,750
xDrive35i	2011–2013	N55B30	306 PS (225 kW; 302 hp) at 5,800	400 N⋅m (295 lbf⋅ft) at 1,200–5,000
4.8i	2007–2008	N62B48	355 PS (261 kW; 350 hp) at 6,300	475 N⋅m (350 lb⋅ft) at 3,400–3,800
xDrive48i	2009–2010	N62B48	355 PS (261 kW; 350 hp) at 6,300	475 N⋅m (350 lb⋅ft) at 3,400–3,800
xDrive50i	2011–2013	N63B44	408 PS (300 kW; 402 hp) at 5,500-6,400	610 N⋅m (450 lbf⋅ft) at 1,750–4,500
M	2010-2013	S63B44	555 PS (408 kW; 547 hp) at 6,000	680 N⋅m (502 lbf⋅ft) at 1,500–5,650

==== Diesel engines ====
Model	Years	Engine code	Power	Torque
3.0d	2007–2008	M57TU2D30	235 PS (173 kW; 232 hp) at 4,000	520 N⋅m (384 lbf⋅ft) at 2,000–2,750
xDrive30d	2009–2010	M57TU2D30	235 PS (173 kW; 232 hp) at 4,000	520 N⋅m (384 lbf⋅ft) at 2,000–2,750
3.0sd	2007–2008	M57TU2D30	286 PS (210 kW; 282 hp) at 4,400	580 N⋅m (428 lbf⋅ft) at 1,750–2,250
xDrive35d	2009-2010	M57TU2D30	286 PS (210 kW; 282 hp) at 4,400	580 N⋅m (428 lbf⋅ft) at 1,750–2,250
xDrive35d; US Market	2009–2013	M57Y Twin Turbo	269 PS (198 kW; 265 hp) at 4,200	576 N⋅m (425 lb⋅ft) at 1,750
xDrive30d	2011–2013	N57D30O0	245 PS (180 kW; 242 hp) at 4,000	540 N⋅m (398 lbf⋅ft) at 1,750
xDrive40d	2010–2013	N57D30T0 Bi Turbo	306 PS (225 kW; 302 hp) at 4,400	600 N⋅m (443 lbf⋅ft) at 1,500–2,500
M50d	2012-2013	N57S tri Turbo	381 PS (280 kW; 376 hp) at 4,400	740 N⋅m (546 lbf⋅ft) at 2,000–3,000

Since 2008, vehicles sold with diesel engines in the United States are equipped with selective catalysator using Diesel exhaust fluid (DEF) to reduce NOx emissions, while vehicles sold in Europe had a bypass exhaust pipe only due the regulations which ended up in Dieselgate.

=== Transmissions ===
All models include a 6-speed Steptronic automatic transmission called a ZF 6HP 26, or ZF 6HP 26X for xDrive models. The new 8-speed transmissions are standard in the xDrive50i and xDrive35i from 2011 model year. The 35i uses a ZF 8HP 45 transmission while the 50i uses a ZF 8HP 70 model.

=== Performance ===
Model	top speed (km/h)	0–100 km/h (0–62 mph) (s)	Fuel consumption (ECE) (L/100 km)	CO_{2}-emission (g/km)	Kerb weight (EU)
Petrol
3.0si	210 km/h (130 mph)	8.1	10.2	244	2,260 kg (4,980 lb)
xDrive30i	225 km/h (140 mph)	8.1	10.2	244	2,260 kg (4,980 lb)
4.8i, xDrive48i	240 km/h (149 mph)	6.5	12.0	286	2,420 kg (5,340 lb)
X5 M	210 km/h (130 mph), 275 km/h (171 mph) with M Driver's Package	4.7	13.9	325	2,434 kg (5,366 lb)
xDrive35i	242 km/h (150 mph)	6.8	10.1	236	2,250 kg (4,960 lb)
xDrive50i	250 km/h (155 mph)	5.5	12.5	292	2,440 kg (5,380 lb)
Diesel
3.0d	210 km/h (130 mph)	8.0	8.2	217	2,150 kg (4,740 lb)
xDrive30d (2008–2010)	216 km/h (134 mph)	8.0	8.2	214	2,150 kg (4,740 lb)
3.0sd, xDrive35d	235 km/h (146 mph)	6.9	8.3	220	2,335 kg (5,148 lb)
xDrive30d (2010-)	210 km/h (130 mph)	7.6	7.4	195	2,150 kg (4,740 lb)
xDrive40d	237 km/h (147 mph)	6.6	9.2	198	2,185 kg (4,817 lb)

=== Safety ===
- Winner of Top Safety Pick 2008 by Insurance Institute for Highway Safety.

==== NHTSA ====
NHTSA 2013 X5 xDrive35i:
Overall:	4/5 stars
Frontal Driver:	3/5 stars
Frontal Passenger:	3/5 stars
Side Driver:	5/5 stars
Side Passenger:	5/5 stars
Side Pole Driver:	5/5 stars
Rollover:	/ 17.4%

== 2010/2011 X5 "Life Cycle Impulse" (LCI) Changes ==
In 2010 the X5 underwent a "Life Cycle Impulse" (LCI) update, debuted at the New York Auto Show in April 2010 and introduced as 2011 models in BMW North America markets. The changes included revised styling, primarily of the front and rear bumpers, air intakes, headlights, and taillights as well as new exterior and interior colors and new options combination. It also included BMW Group's latest infotainment system. HD Radio, previously an option, was now standard on all X5 models in North America.

More significantly, a new range of engines, all turbocharged and with direct injection was introduced. In the North American market, available gasoline power trains are the xDrive 35i twin-scroll turbo six-cylinder and the xDrive50i twin turbo V8, both coupled to an eight-speed automatic Steptronic transmission. These petrol engines are more powerful than their predecessors, with the 35i also providing improved fuel mileage and reduced emissions. The xDrive 35d turbodiesel carries over in the NA market with the six-speed transmission unchanged from the previous model year. The xDrive40d was also introduced along with a revised xDrive30d, but neither was available in the North American market.

The X5M engine and transmission remains the same.

Pre-facelift styling

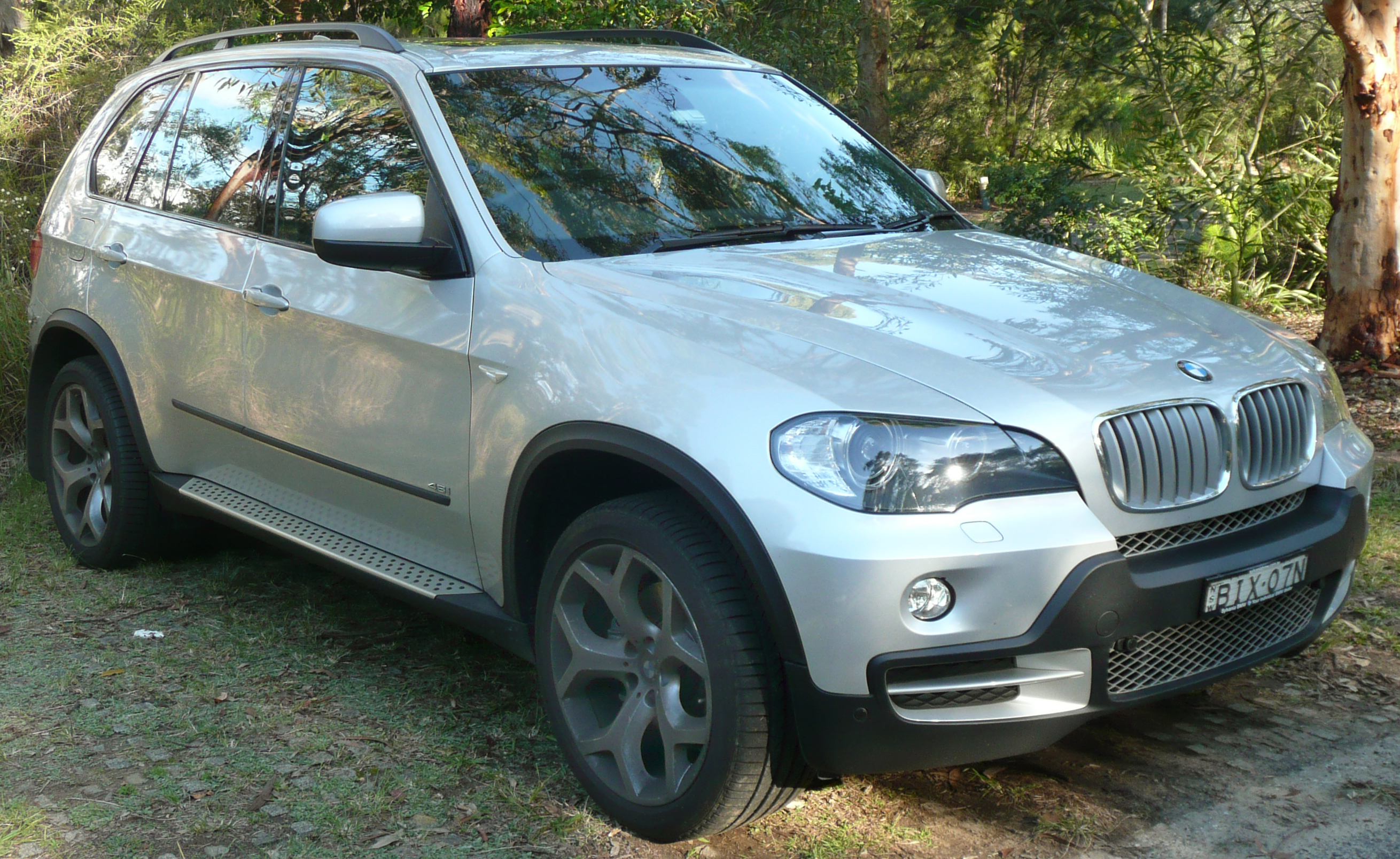
Front (4.8i)

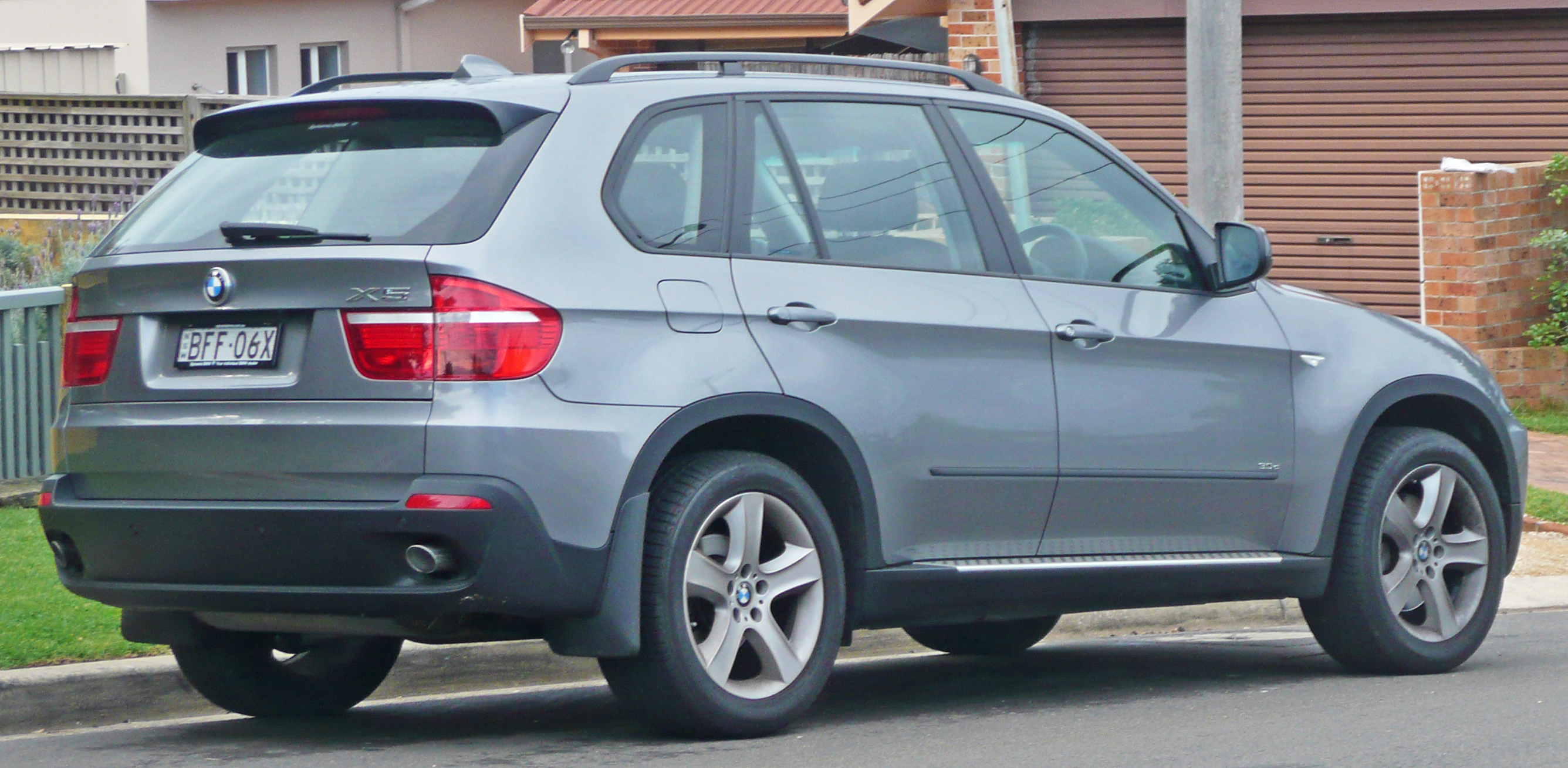
Rear (3.0d)
Post-facelift styling

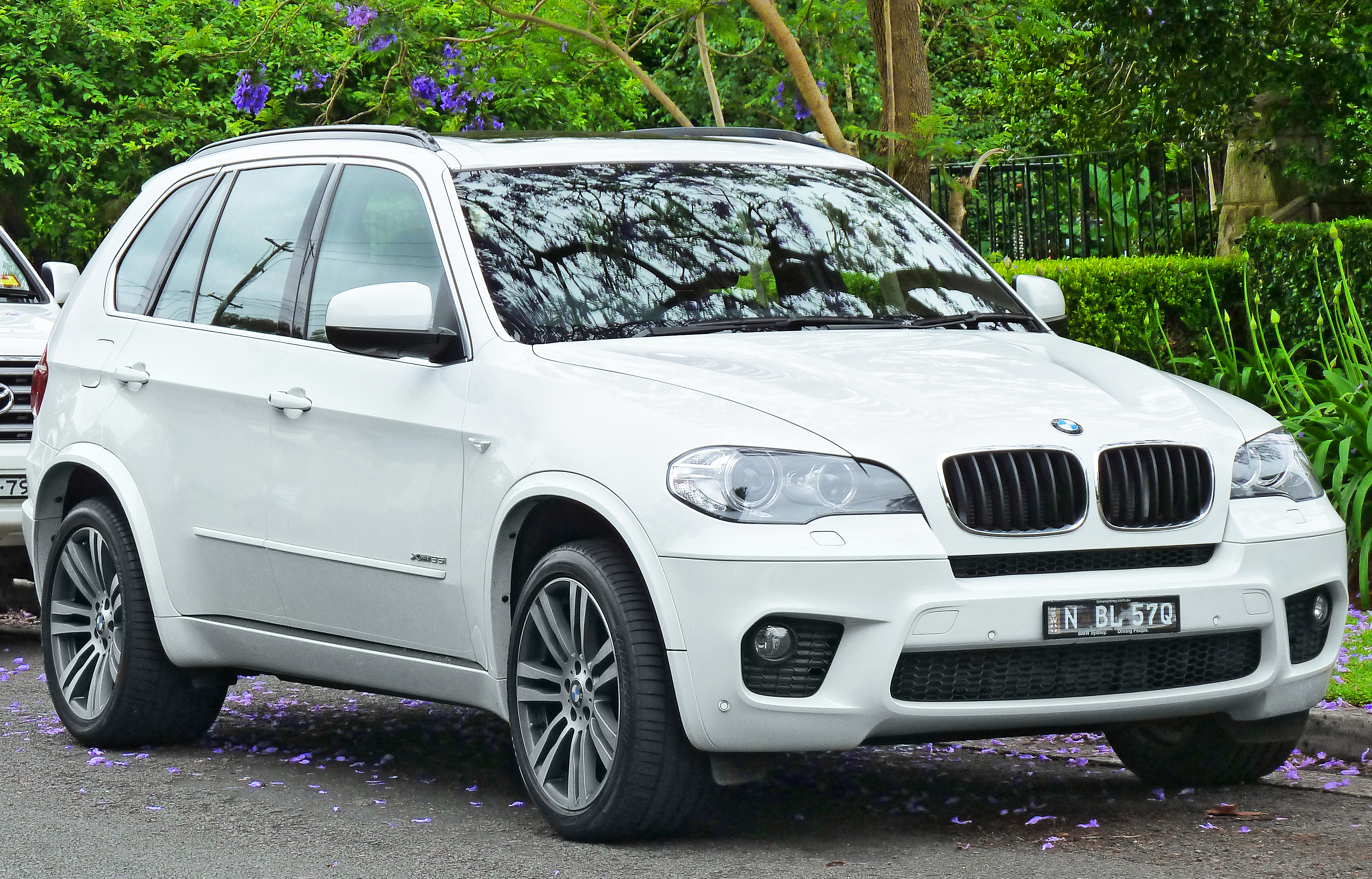
Front (xDrive35i M Sport)

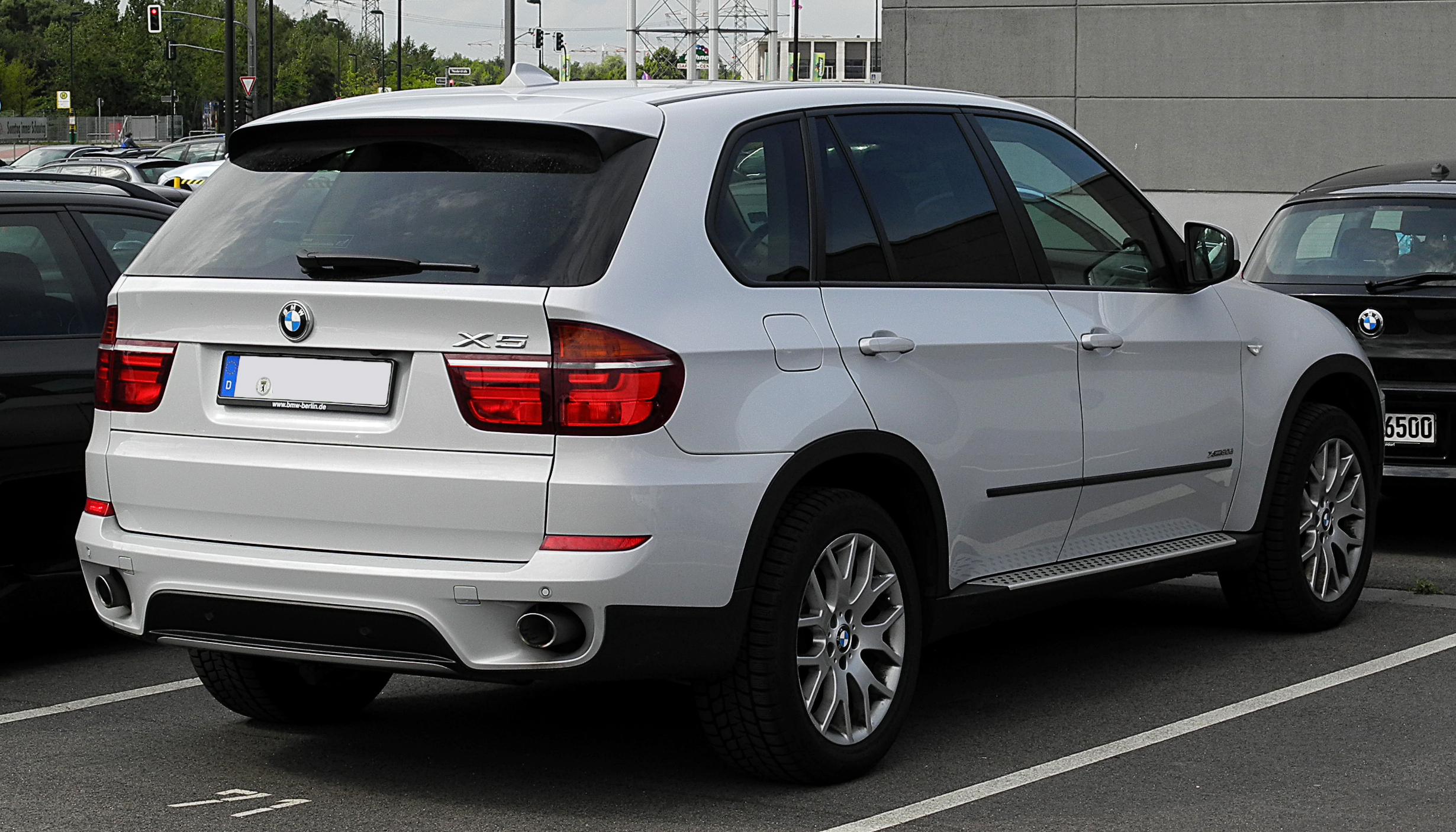
Rear (xDrive30d)

== BMW X5 Security Plus ==
It is a variant with safety glass, heavy-duty material and ballistics-resistant steel modifications. It comes with a 4.8l engine with Steptronic automatic transmission. Armour is rated to safety class VR4 and is configured to carry a roof mounted 7.62mm, AK-47 assault rifle. The vehicle sells for approximately $220,000.

== Vision Efficient Dynamics ==
It is a hybrid electric vehicle model featuring 2.0 L four-cylinder variable twin-turbo diesel engine rated 204 PS (150 kW; 201 hp) and 400 N⋅m (295 lbf⋅ft) at 2,000–2,250 rpm, a 15-kilowatt electric motor driven by a lithium ion battery pack, eight-speed transmission developed by BMW and ZF, roof-mounted solar panels, 19-inch light alloy wheels with reduced ventilation. It was unveiled in 2008 at the Geneva Auto Show.
