= BMW 5 Series (E60) =

Fifth generation of BMW 5 Series

BMW 5 Series (E60/E61)
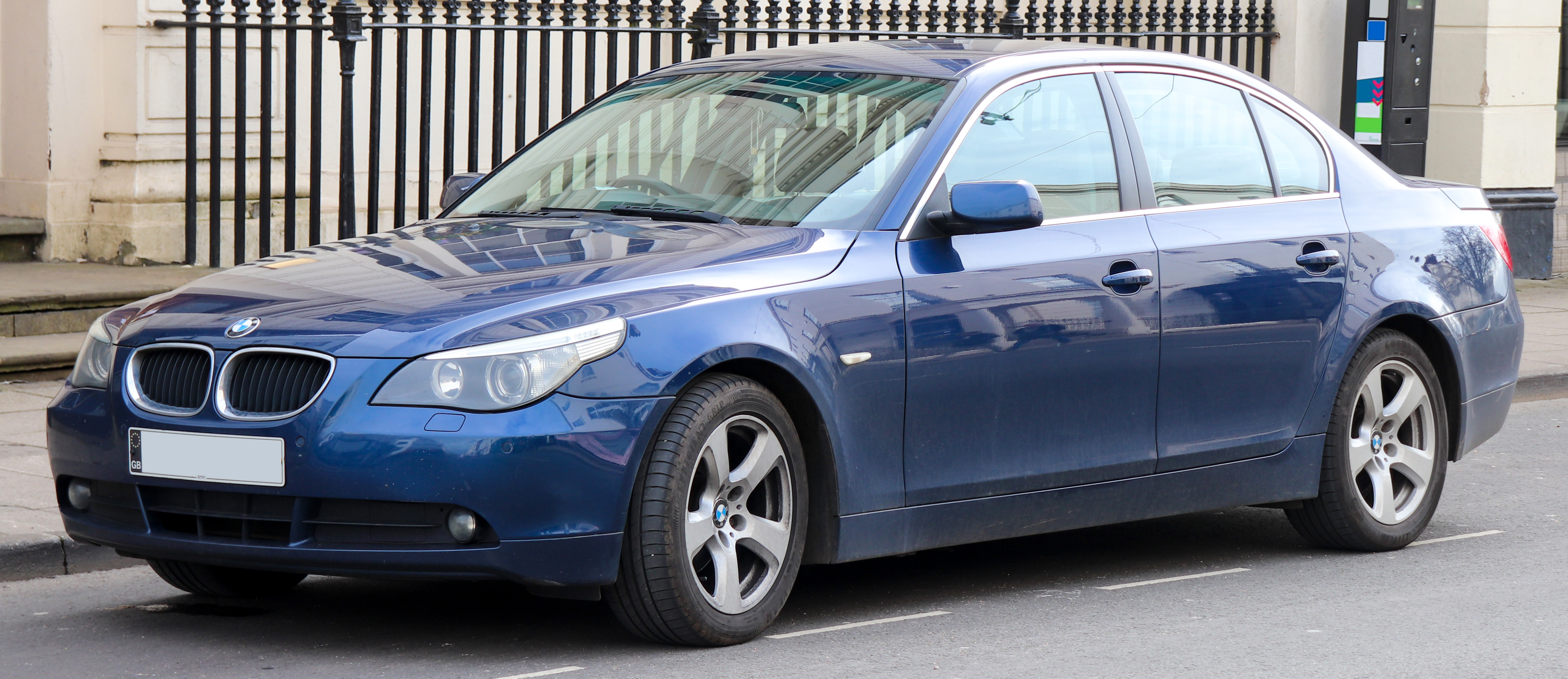

Overview
- Manufacturer: BMW
- Model code: E60 (Saloon); E61 (Touring)
- Production: July 5, 2003 – 2010
- Model years: 2004–2010
- Assembly: Germany: Dingolfing (BMW Group Plant Dingolfing); China: Shenyang (BBA); Mexico: Toluca (BMW Mexico); India: Chennai (BMW India); Russia: Kaliningrad (Avtotor); Thailand: Rayong (BMW Thailand); Indonesia: Jakarta (Gaya Motor); Egypt: 6th of October City (BAG)
- Designer: Boyke Boyer; Davide Arcangeli; Chris Bangle

Body and chassis
- Class: Executive car (E)
- Body style: 4-door saloon (E60); 5-door estate (E61)
- Layout: Rear-wheel drive, All-wheel drive (xDrive)
- Related: BMW M5 (E60); BMW 6 Series (E63)

Powertrain
- Engine: Petrol: 2.0 L N46 I4; 2.2–3.0 L M54/N52/N53 I6; 3.0 L N54 turbo I6; 4.0–4.8 L N62 V8; 5.0 L S85 V10; Diesel: 2.0 L M47/N47 turbo I4; 2.5–3.0 L M57 turbo I6
- Transmission: 6-speed manual; 6-speed automatic; 6-speed SMG-II; 7-speed SMG-III

Dimensions
- Wheelbase: 2,890 mm (113.8 in); 3,030 mm (119.3 in) (LWB version, China)
- Length: 4,843 mm (190.7 in); 4,983 mm (196.2 in) (LWB version, China)
- Width: 1,850 mm (72.8 in)
- Height: 1,470–1,491 mm (57.9–58.7 in)
- Curb weight: 1,545–1,830 kg (3,406–4,034 lb)

Chronology
- Predecessor: BMW 5 Series (E39)
- Successor: BMW 5 Series (F10)

The fifth generation of the BMW 5 Series executive cars consists of the BMW E60 (saloon version) and BMW E61 (estate version, marketed as 'Touring'). The E60/E61 generation was produced by BMW from 2003 to 2010 and is often collectively referred to as the E60.

The E60 generation introduced various new electronic features, including the iDrive infotainment system, head-up display, active cruise control, active steering, adaptive headlights, night vision, lane departure warning and voice control. The E60 was the first 5 Series to be available with a turbocharged petrol engine, a 6-speed automatic transmission and regenerative braking.

The M5 model was introduced in 2005 and is powered by the BMW S85 V10 engine. It was sold in the saloon and estate body styles, with most cars using the 7-speed SMG III transmission. It was the first and only M5 model to be sold with a V10 engine.

In January 2010, the BMW 5 Series (F10) began production as the successor to the E60.

== Development and launch ==
The development programme for the E60 began in 1997, concluding in 2002. The lead designer was Boyke Boyer. The final design, developed by Davide Arcangeli under BMW Design Director Chris Bangle, was approved in 2000 and German design patents filed on 16 April 2002.

The saloon was launched on 5 July 2003 in Europe and in October 2003 in North America. In late 2004, the Touring models were introduced.

== Body styles ==
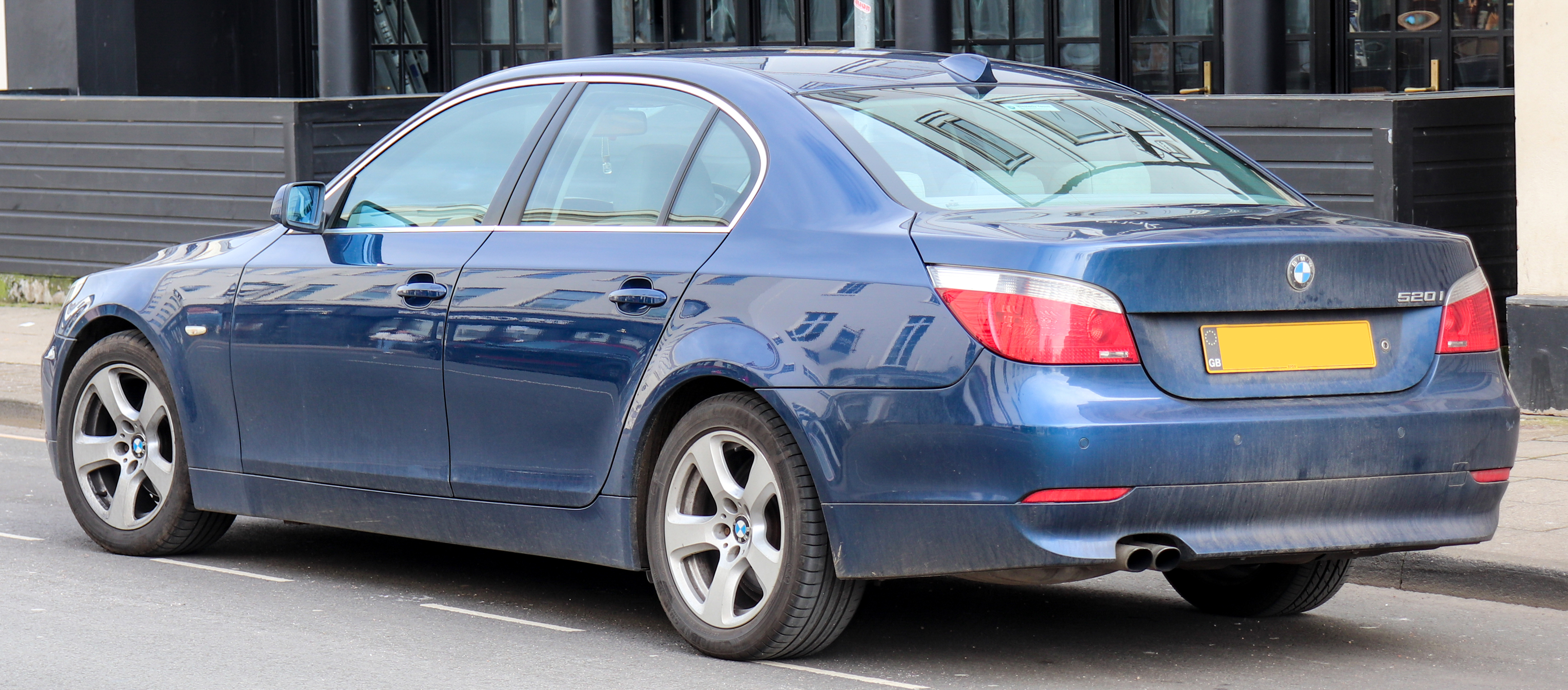
saloon (E60)

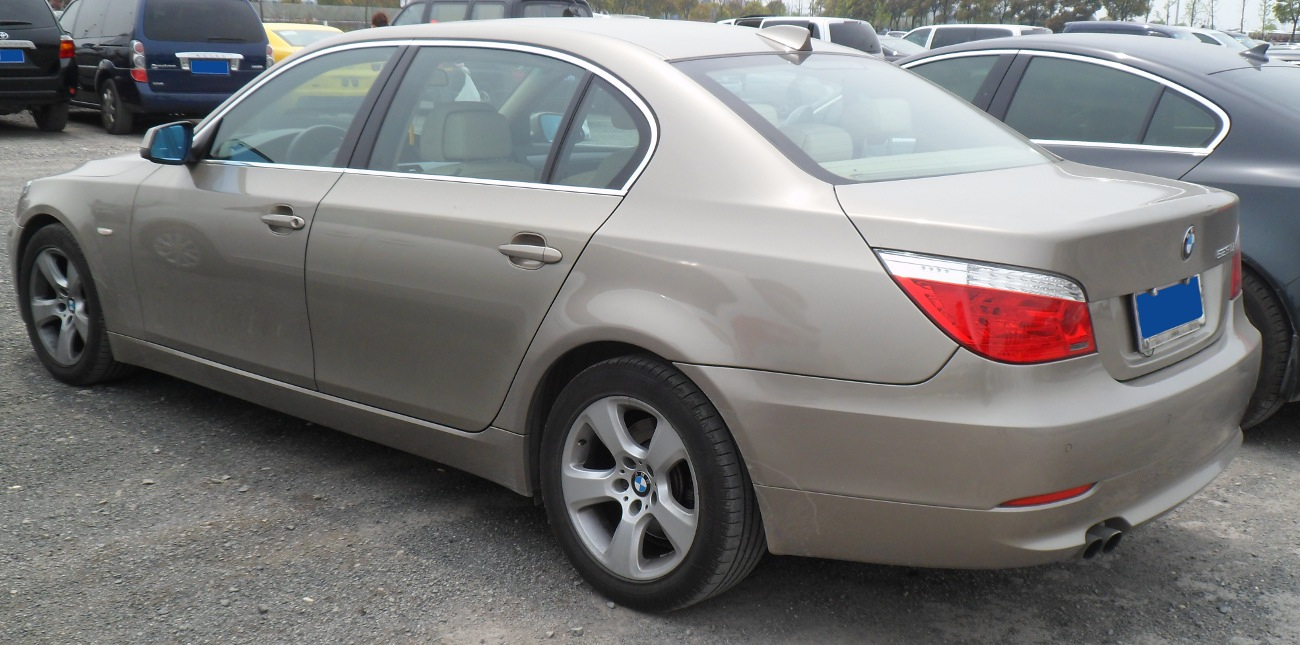
Long wheelbase saloon (E60) (China only)

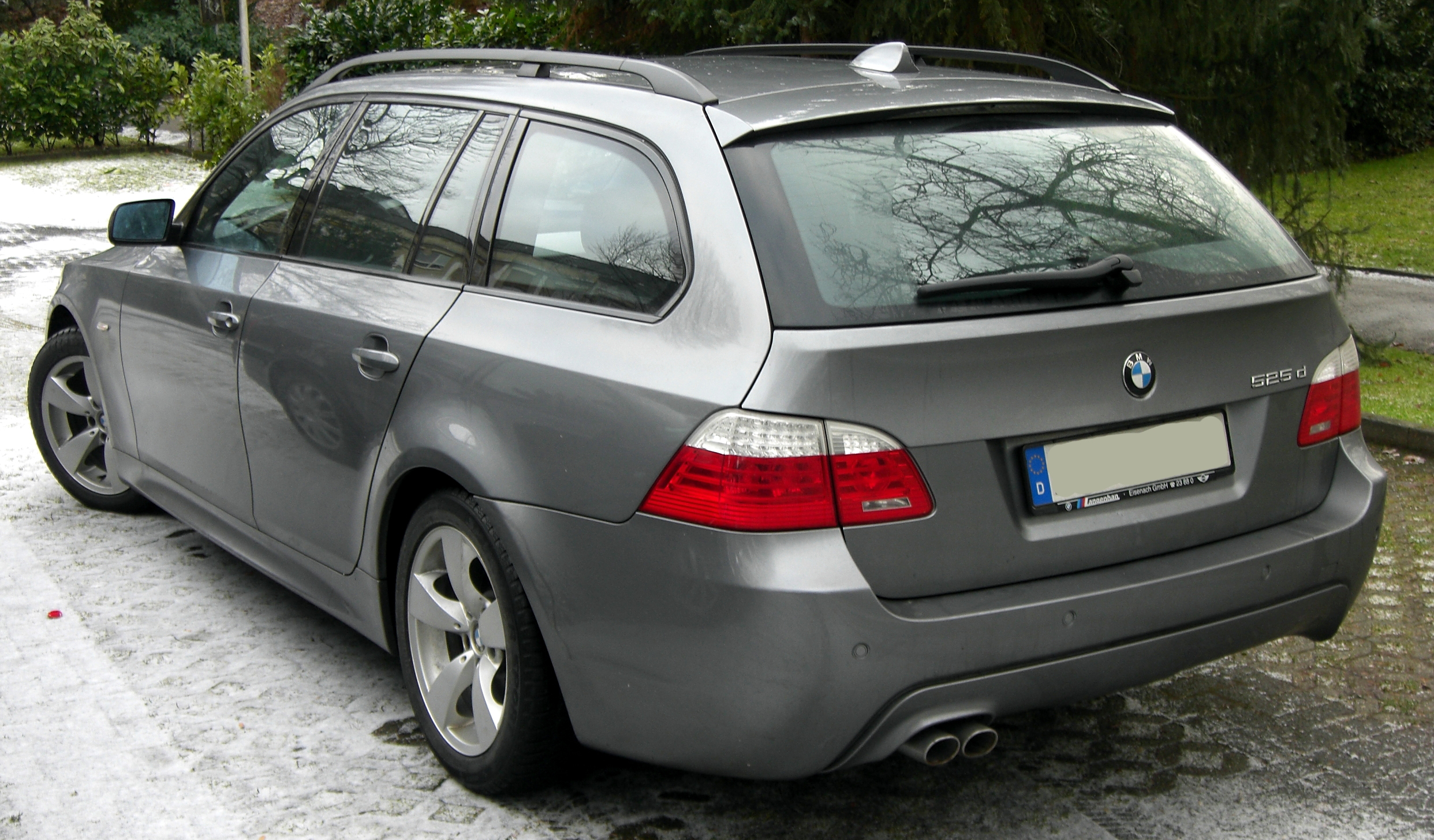
Touring (E61)

The body of the E60 was made using aluminium for the front of the car, and steel for the passenger cabin and rear. Kerb weights are 1,445–1,725 kg (3,186–3,803 lb) for the saloon and 1,675–1,830 kg (3,693–4,034 lb) for the wagon. The weight distribution of the saloon models was 50:50.

== Interior / Equipment ==
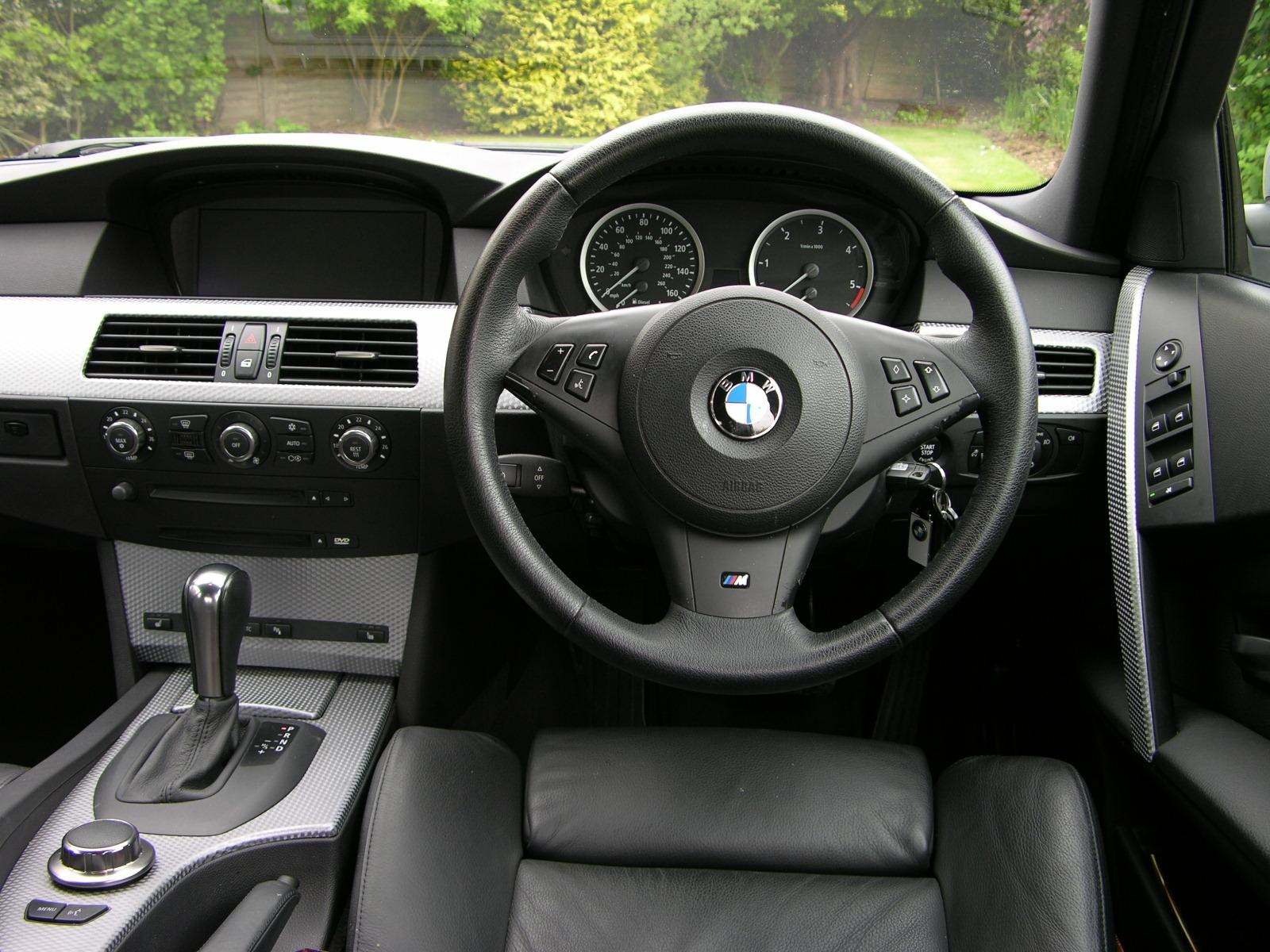
Interior (pre-facelift)

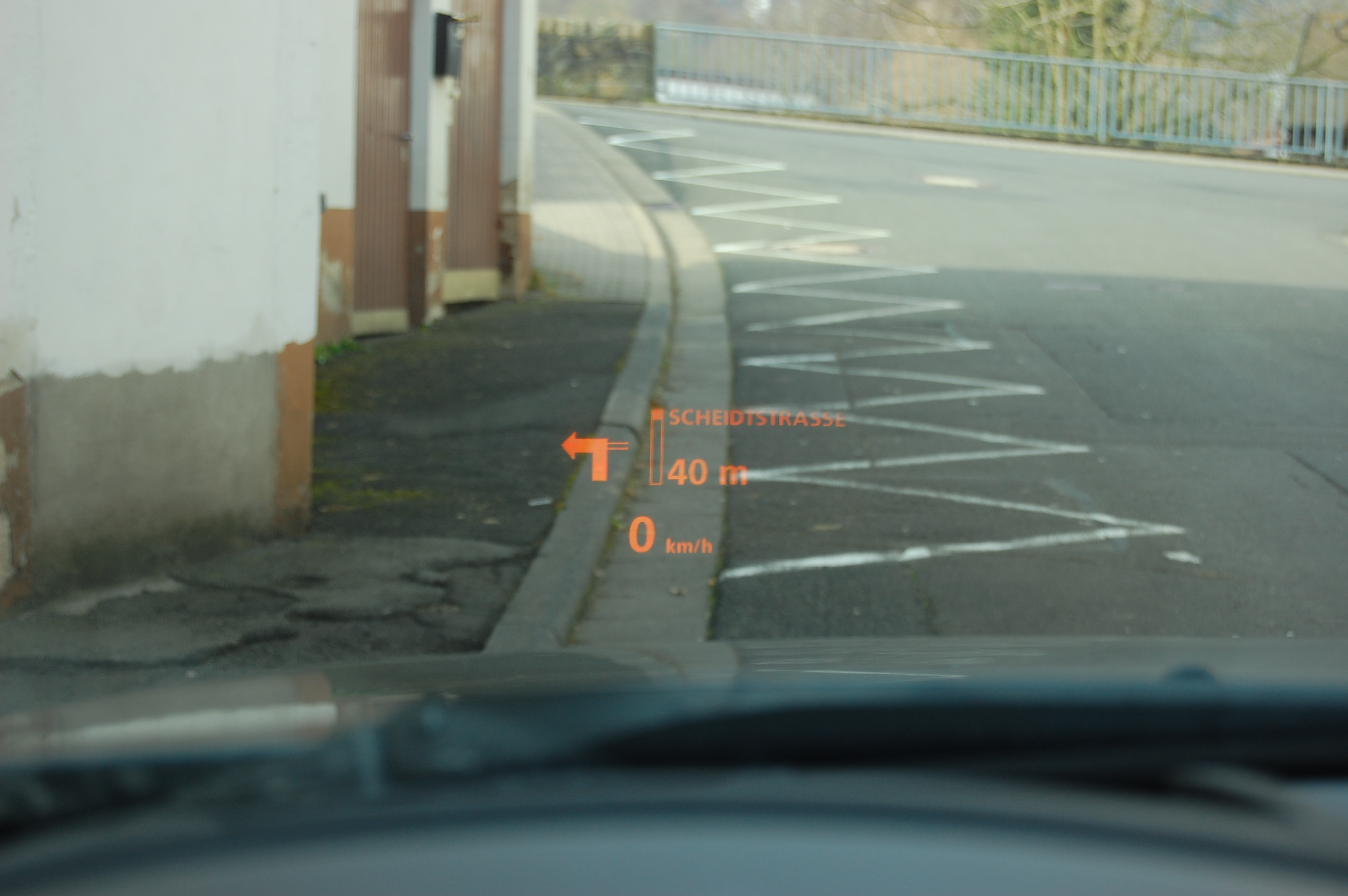
Head-up display

The iDrive infotainment system— first introduced in the E65 7 Series— was fitted to all E60 models. The standard iDrive system included a 6.5-inch LCD screen, a single-disc CD/MP3 player, Bluetooth for phone calls (available only on later-build 2004 models, and standard on all 2005 and newer models), basic voice control, and vehicle settings. Optional features included an 8-inch LCD screen, GPS navigation, Sirius Satellite Radio (on North American-spec models), and DVD video playback. iPod and USB integration, HD Radio (on North American-spec models), an auxiliary audio input jack (standard on 2008 and newer models), full voice control, and a multi-disc CD/MP3/DVD changer (mounted in the glove compartment). On North American-spec models, a ten-speaker premium audio system with dual under-seat subwoofers and an amplifier was standard equipment, with a thirteen-speaker Harman Kardon "Logic 7" premium surround sound audio system available as an option on all models.

An emergency hotline feature (BMW Assist) was also available for the E60. The BMW Assist system could also use the phone network to notify the driver and their preferred BMW dealership when servicing was due. This feature was standard on all E60 models sold in the United States.

Other features available in the E60 initially included active cruise control, Bi-Xenon headlights, run-flat tyres, active anti-roll bars, head-up display and active steering. Safety-related items include Dynamic Stability Control (DSC), adaptive headlights and night vision.

In 2009, the iDrive system was upgraded from the first-generation "CCC" interface to the newer "CIC" interface. The audio system control panel added six multifunction preset buttons that could be programmed to store favorite radio stations and frequently-dialed telephone numbers for the Bluetooth hands-free system. The iDrive controller in the centre console was also redesigned, and now integrated shortcut keys for frequently-used functions.

Over the E60's lifespan, the following features were added: Active Cruise Control with Stop & Go, keyless entry ("comfort access"), LED taillights, Lane Departure Warning and Brake Force Display.

The E60 was the first 5 Series in 22 years where the centre console was not angled towards the driver, however the E60's successor returned to angling the centre console towards the driver.

In 2003 a 6-speed SMG-II gearbox was offered as an option on the 525i, 530i, 545i and 550i in some markets.

== Engines ==
=== Petrol ===
At launch, the E60 used the previous generation E39 5 Series' M54 straight 6 engine in the 520i, 525i and 530i models. The only petrol model with a new engine at launch was the 545i with the N62 V8. The M54 was phased out after the 2005 model years and replaced with the straight-4 N43 (in the 520i) and the straight-6 N52 engine (in the 525i and 530i). The model range was also expanded the same year to include a wider range of models like the 523i, 540i and 550i. In 2007, the only turbocharged petrol E60 model was introduced, the 535i with the twin-turbo straight-6 N54 engine. This model was exclusive to the North American market and was not sold in Europe.

Model	Years	Engine	Power	Torque
520i	2003–2005	2.2 L (2,171 cc); M54B22 straight-6	125 kW (170 PS; 168 hp) at 6,250 rpm	210 N⋅m (155 lb⋅ft) at 3,500 rpm
520i	2007–2010	2.0 L (1,995 cc); N46B20 straight-4 (Note: For countries with high-sulfur petrol)	115 kW (156 PS; 154 hp) at 6,400 rpm	200 N⋅m (148 lb⋅ft) at 3,500 rpm
520i	2007–2010	2.0 L (1,995 cc); N43B20 straight-4	125 kW (170 PS; 168 hp) at 6,700 rpm	210 N⋅m (155 lb⋅ft) at 4,250 rpm
523i	2005–2007	2.5 L (2,497 cc); N52B25 straight-6 (Note: In countries with high-sulfur fuel, the N52 engine remained in use from 2007 to 2010)	130 kW (177 PS; 174 hp) at 5,800 rpm	230 N⋅m (170 lb⋅ft) at 3,500 rpm
523i	2007–2010	2.5 L (2,497 cc); N53B25 straight-6	140 kW (190 PS; 188 hp) at 6,100 rpm	240 N⋅m (177 lb⋅ft) at 3,500 rpm
525i	2003–2005	2.5 L (2,494 cc); M54B25 straight-6	141 kW (192 PS; 189 hp) at 6,000 rpm	237 N⋅m (175 lb⋅ft) at 3,500 rpm
525i	2005–2007	2.5 L (2,497 cc); N52B25 straight-6 (Note: In countries with high-sulfur fuel, the N52 engine remained in use from 2007 to 2010)	160 kW (218 PS; 215 hp) at 6,500 rpm	250 N⋅m (184 lb⋅ft) at 2,750 rpm
525i	2007–2010	3.0 L (2,996 cc); N53B30 straight-6	160 kW (218 PS; 215 hp) at 6,100 rpm	270 N⋅m (199 lb⋅ft) at 2,400 rpm
528i	2007–2010	3.0 L (2,996 cc); N52B30 straight-6 (Note: U.S. Market only)	172 kW (234 PS; 231 hp) at 6,500 rpm	270 N⋅m (199 lb⋅ft) at 2,750 rpm
530i	2003–2005	3.0 L (2,979 cc); M54B30 straight-6	170 kW (231 PS; 228 hp) at 5,900 rpm	300 N⋅m (221 lb⋅ft) at 3,500 rpm
530i	2005–2007	3.0 L (2,996 cc); N52B30 straight-6	190 kW (258 PS; 255 hp) at 6,600 rpm	300 N⋅m (221 lb⋅ft) at 2,500 rpm
530i	2007–2010	3.0 L (2,996 cc); N53B30 straight-6 (Note: In countries with high-sulfur fuel, the N52 engine remained in use from 2007 to 2010)	200 kW (272 PS; 268 hp) at 6,700 rpm	320 N⋅m (236 lb⋅ft) at 2,750 rpm
535i	2007–2010	3.0 L (2,979 cc); N54B30 turbo straight-6	225 kW (306 PS; 302 hp) at 5,800 rpm	400 N⋅m (295 lb⋅ft) at 1,300–5,000 rpm
540i	2005-2010	4.0 L (4,000 cc); N62B40 V8	225 kW (306 PS; 302 hp) at 6,300 rpm	390 N⋅m (288 lb⋅ft) at 3,500 rpm
545i	2003–2005	4.4 L (4,398 cc); N62B44 V8	245 kW (333 PS; 329 hp) at 6,100 rpm	450 N⋅m (332 lb⋅ft) at 3,600 rpm
550i	2005–2010	4.8 L (4,799 cc); N62B48 V8	270 kW (367 PS; 362 hp) at 6,300 rpm	490 N⋅m (361 lb⋅ft) at 3,400 rpm
M5	2005–2010	5.0 L (4,999 cc); S85B50 V10	373 kW (507 PS; 500 hp) at 7,750 rpm	520 N⋅m (384 lb⋅ft) at 6,100 rpm

=== Diesel ===
The only diesel model available at launch was the 530d, which used an updated "TÜ" version of the M57 engine found in the previous generation E39 5 Series. In 2004 the 535d and 525d were added to the model range which also used different versions of the M57 straight-6 turbo engine. In 2005, the only 4-cylinder diesel model E60 was added to the model range, the 520d using the older M47 engine at first; from 2007 the new N47 engine replaced it. Most of the diesel model range was exclusive to the European market, except a few models which were sold in some Asian markets. No diesel models were offered in North America.

Model	Years	Engine- turbo	Power	Torque
520d	2005–2007	2.0 L (1,995 cc); M47TÜ2D20 straight-4	120 kW (163 PS; 161 hp) at 4,000 rpm	350 N⋅m (258 lb⋅ft) at 1,750–3,000 rpm
520d	2007–2010	2.0 L (1,995 cc); N47D20 straight-4	130 kW (177 PS; 174 hp) at 4,000 rpm	350 N⋅m (258 lb⋅ft) at 1,750–2,500 rpm
525d	2004–2007	2.5 L (2,497 cc); M57D25TÜ straight-6	130 kW (177 PS; 174 hp) at 4,000 rpm	400 N⋅m (295 lb⋅ft) at 2,000 rpm
525d	2007–2010	3.0 L (2,993 cc); M57D30TÜ2 straight-6	145 kW (197 PS; 194 hp) at 4,000 rpm	400 N⋅m (295 lb⋅ft) at 1,300–3,250 rpm
530d	2003–2005	3.0 L (2,993 cc); M57D30TÜ straight-6	160 kW (218 PS; 215 hp) at 4,000 rpm	500 N⋅m (369 lb⋅ft) at 2,000 rpm
530d	2005–2007	3.0 L (2,993 cc); M57D30TÜ2 straight-6	170 kW (231 PS; 228 hp) at 4,000 rpm	500 N⋅m (369 lb⋅ft) at 1,750 rpm
530d	2007–2010	3.0 L (2,993 cc); M57D30TÜ2 straight-6	173 kW (235 PS; 232 hp) at 4,000 rpm	500 N⋅m (369 lb⋅ft) at 1,750–3,000 rpm
535d	2004–2007	3.0 L (2,993 cc); M57D30TÜ TOP straight-6	200 kW (272 PS; 268 hp) at 4,400 rpm	560 N⋅m (413 lb⋅ft) at 2,000–2,250 rpm
535d	2007–2010	3.0 L (2,993 cc); M57D30TÜ2 TOP straight-6	210 kW (286 PS; 282 hp) at 4,400 rpm	580 N⋅m (428 lb⋅ft) at 1,750–2,250 rpm

== Transmissions ==
Available transmissions are:

- 6-speed ZF S6-37 manual (2004–2010)
- 6-speed Getrag 217—GS6-17BG / GS6-17DG manual (2004–2010)
- 6-speed ZF S6-53 manual (2004–2010)
- 6-speed ZF 6HP19 automatic (2003–2010) in 525d models
- 6-speed ZF 6HP26 automatic (2003–2007)
- 6-speed ZF 6HP26X automatic (2003–2007) - xdrive 4wd models
- 6-speed ZF 6HP28 automatic (2007–2010)
- 6-speed ZF 6HP28X automatic (2007–2010) - xdrive 4wd models
- 6-speed GS6S37BZ SMG-II (2003–2010)
- 6-speed GS6S53BZ SMG-II (2003–2010)
- 7-speed GS7S47BG SMG III (M5 model)

== M5 model ==
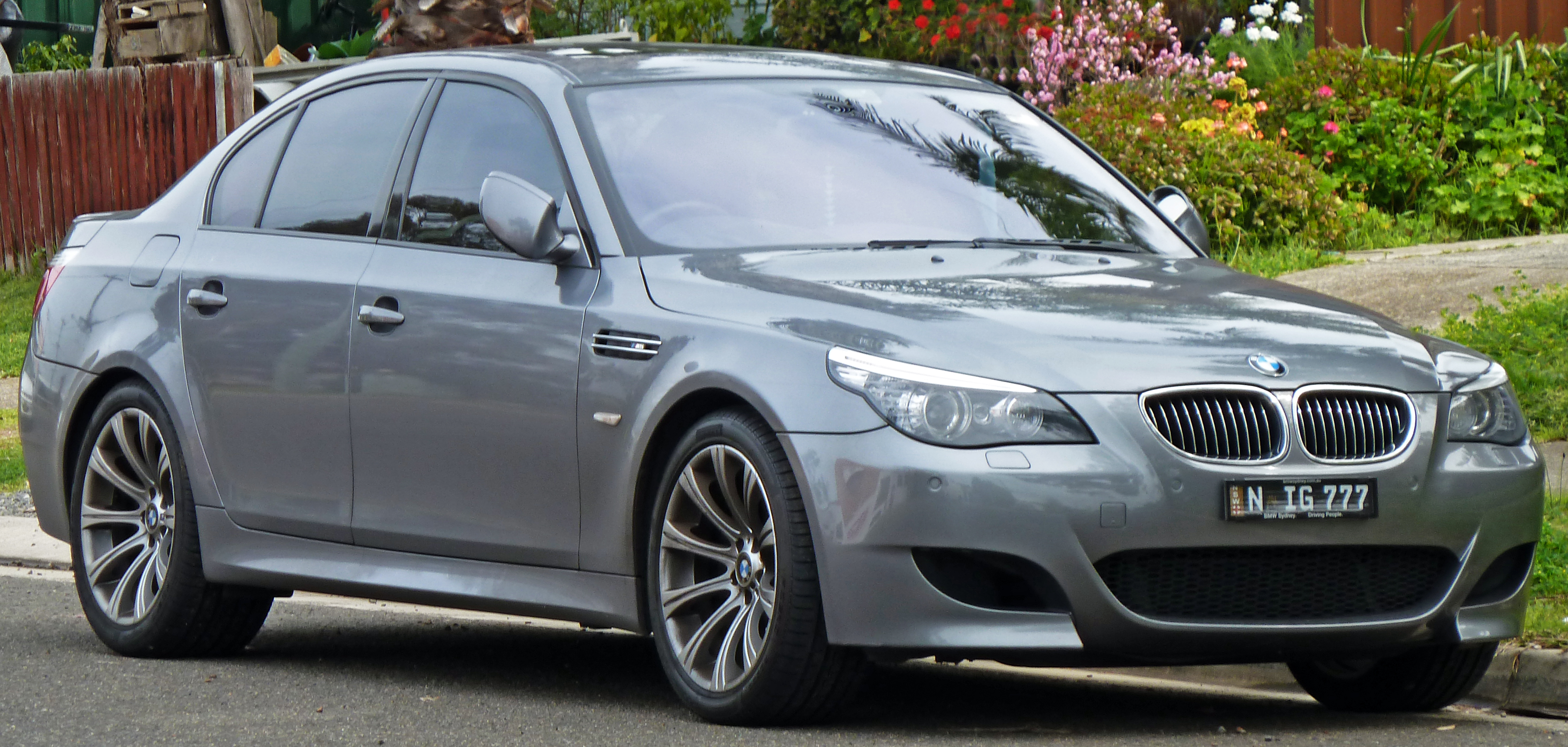
M5 Saloon (E60)

The M5 model of the E60 generation was introduced in 2005 and produced in saloon and wagon body styles. The E60 M5 is powered by the BMW S85 V10 engine, which produces 373 kW (500 hp) at 7,750 rpm, 520 N⋅m (384 lb⋅ft) at 6,100 rpm and has a redline of 8,250 rpm. The 0–100 km/h (0–62 mph) acceleration time is 4.7 seconds.

The majority of M5s were sold with a 7-speed automated manual transmission ("SMG III"), however a 6-speed manual was also available in some markets.

Total production of the M5 was 20,548 units, consisting of 19,523 saloons and 1,025 wagons.

== Special models ==
=== Alpina B5 ===
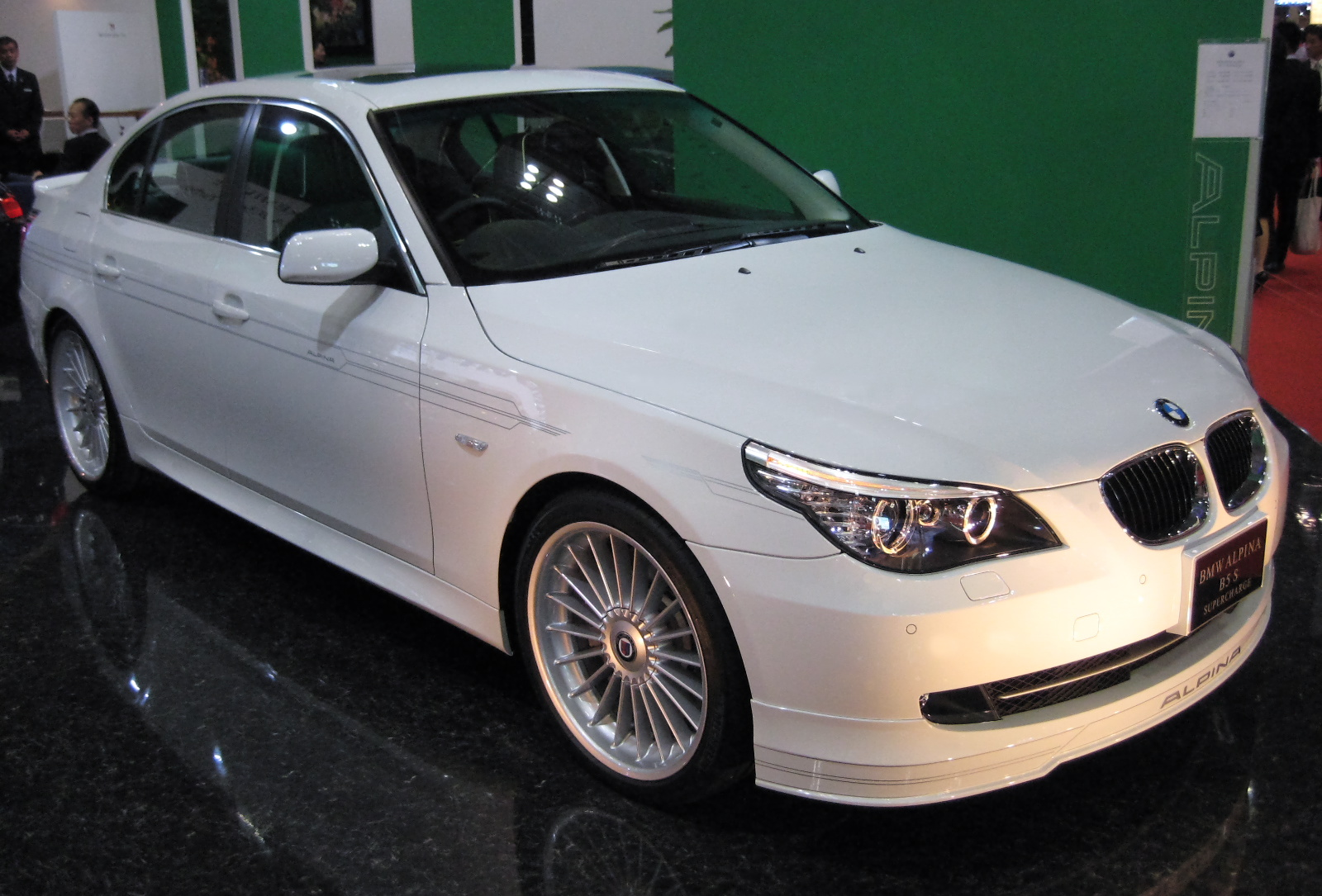
Alpina B5 S

Introduced in February 2005, the Alpina B5 and Alpina B5 S were built in saloon and wagon body styles and powered by the 4.4 L (269 cu in) BMW N62 petrol V8 engine (as used by the 545i) with the addition of a centrifugal supercharger. The rated power outputs are 368 kW (493 hp) for the B5 and 390 kW (523 hp) for the B5 S. Both models used the ZF 6HP26 6-speed hydraulic automatic transmission shared with the regular E60 models.

=== BMW 5 Series Security ===
The E60 was available as 'Security' models, a factory armoured version which was unveiled at the 2005 Frankfurt Motor Show. Built with ballistic steel, aramid, polyethylene and 21mm polycarbonate layered glass it was certified at VR4 level of VPAM's Bullet Resistant Vehicle guidelines (1999). The armoured areas include the entire passenger cell, battery terminals and Engine Control Unit. As standard they included an intercom system and panic alarm.

The Security models were built using the mechanicals of the 530i or the 550i, with upgraded suspension and braking systems. Production of the Security models began alongside the series model at BMW's Dingolfing plant, with armouring prepared before being shipped to a specialist facility in Toluca, Mexico, where the vehicles complete the final assembly stage.

=== Long-wheelbase saloon (China only) ===
A long-wheelbase (LWB) version of the E60 5 Series was offered in China. Models included the 520Li, 523Li, 525Li, and 530Li. The wheelbase was increased to 3,030 mm (119.3 in) from the original wheelbase of 2,890 mm (114 in), a 140 mm (5.5 in) increase.

=== BMW 5 Series Authority Vehicle ===
The 5 Series Authority Vehicle is designed for police forces, fire services, and emergency rescue services. It has a firearm bracket in the rear centre armrest.

== Safety ==
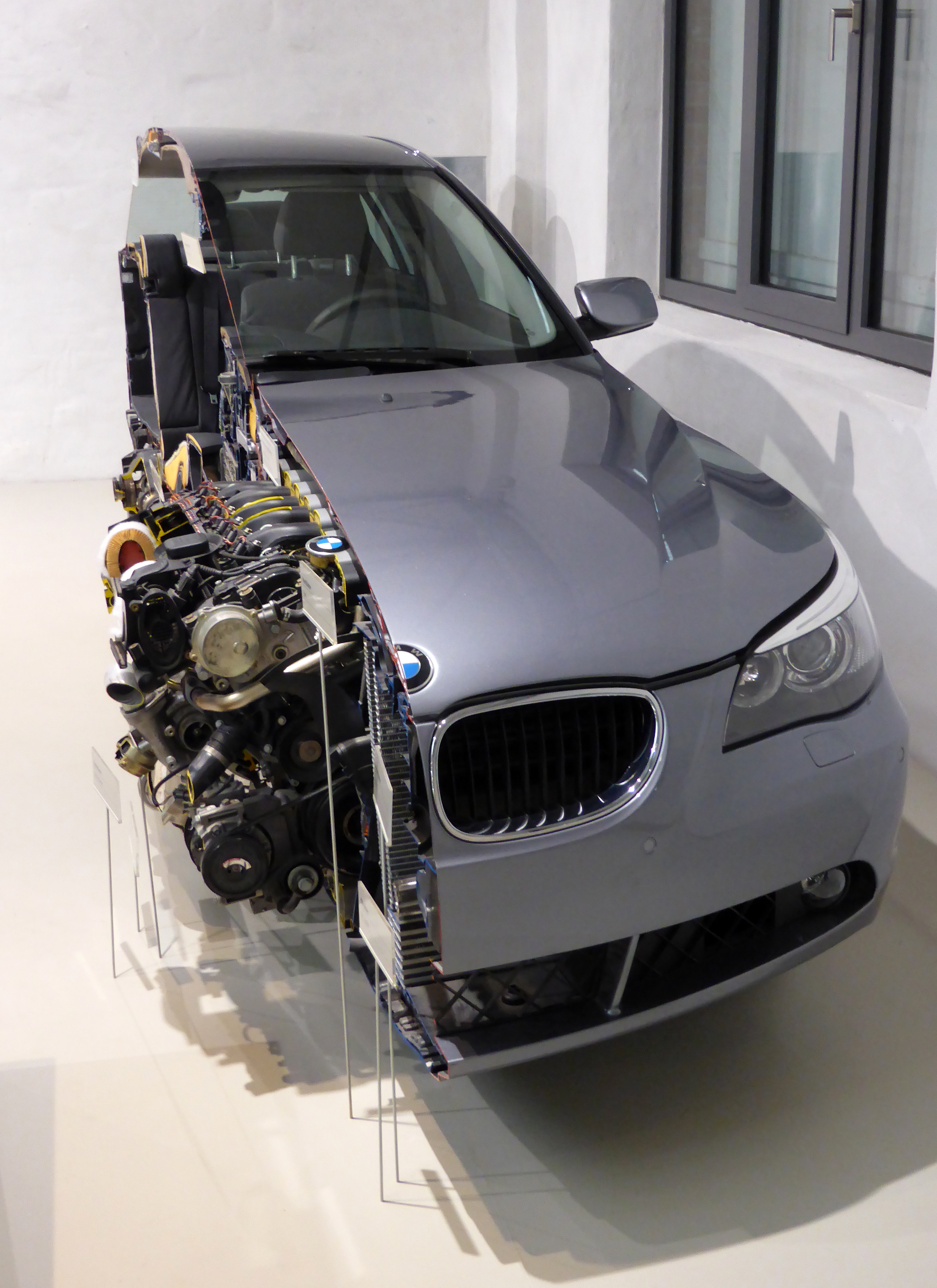
section view- front

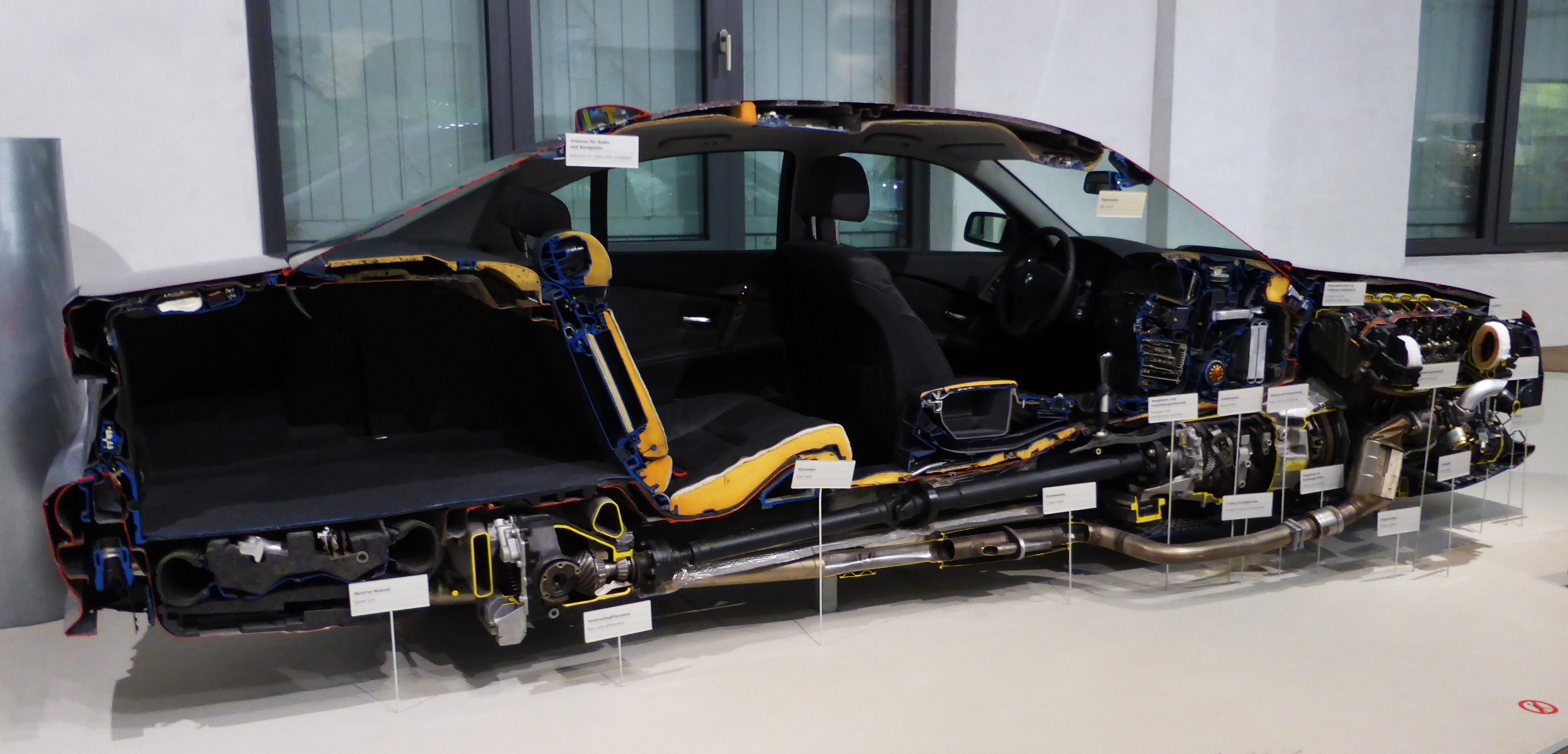
section view- side

Initially the 5 Series received a three-star rating for adult occupants. However changes were made to the steering column, footrest, door trims, door latch, airbags and electronic software and the car was retested achieving its four-star rating. BMW claims the modifications improved the car's Euro NCAP score, not the vehicle's safety; consequently BMW chose not to recall the earlier-built cars.

The American Insurance Institute for Highway Safety (IIHS) gives the 5 Series a "Good" overall rating in frontal collisions but a "Marginal" overall rating for side impact collisions. The IIHS reported their side impact test would likely cause driver related rib fractures and/or internal organ injuries. The IIHS tests were conducted on models built after May 2007; these models had modifications to improve side impact safety.

ANCAP test results BMW 5 Series 520i sedan (2004)
Test	Score
Overall	4 /5 stars
Frontal offset	10.57/16
Side impact	14.31/16
Pole	2/2
Seat belt reminders	2/3
Whiplash protection	Not Assessed
Pedestrian protection	Poor
Electronic stability control	Standard

Euro NCAP scores (2004 saloon)
Adult Occupant:	4/5 stars
Child Occupant:	4/5 stars
Pedestrian:	1/4 stars

NHTSA scores (2008 saloon)
Frontal Driver:	3/5 stars
Frontal Passenger:	5/5 stars
Side Driver:	5/5 stars
Side Rear Passenger:	5/5 stars
Rollover:	4/5 stars

== 2007 facelift ==
The 'Life Cycle impulse' (LCI) models were introduced in March 2007 (for the 2008 model year). Styling changes were relatively subtle, and included revised headlights, tail lights and front bumper. The interior was significantly revised. The iDrive system was upgraded with programmable "favourite" shortcut buttons (for 2009 models), a revised menu system, preset buttons for the audio system and the switch from DVD to hard disk based storage (for 2010 models).

Mechanically, the 5 Series gained the new engines and transmissions from the E70 X5. On automatic transmission models, a shift by wire shifter replaced the mechanical version and shift paddles were available for the first time on a 5 Series model besides the M5.

The active cruise control was upgraded to bring the vehicle to a complete stop and accelerate from stationary (called "Stop & Go"). Other changes include adaptive headlights, LED rear lights, Lane Departure Warning, night vision and Brake Force Display. The E60 LCI was the first BMW to feature regenerative braking.

Facelift exterior changes

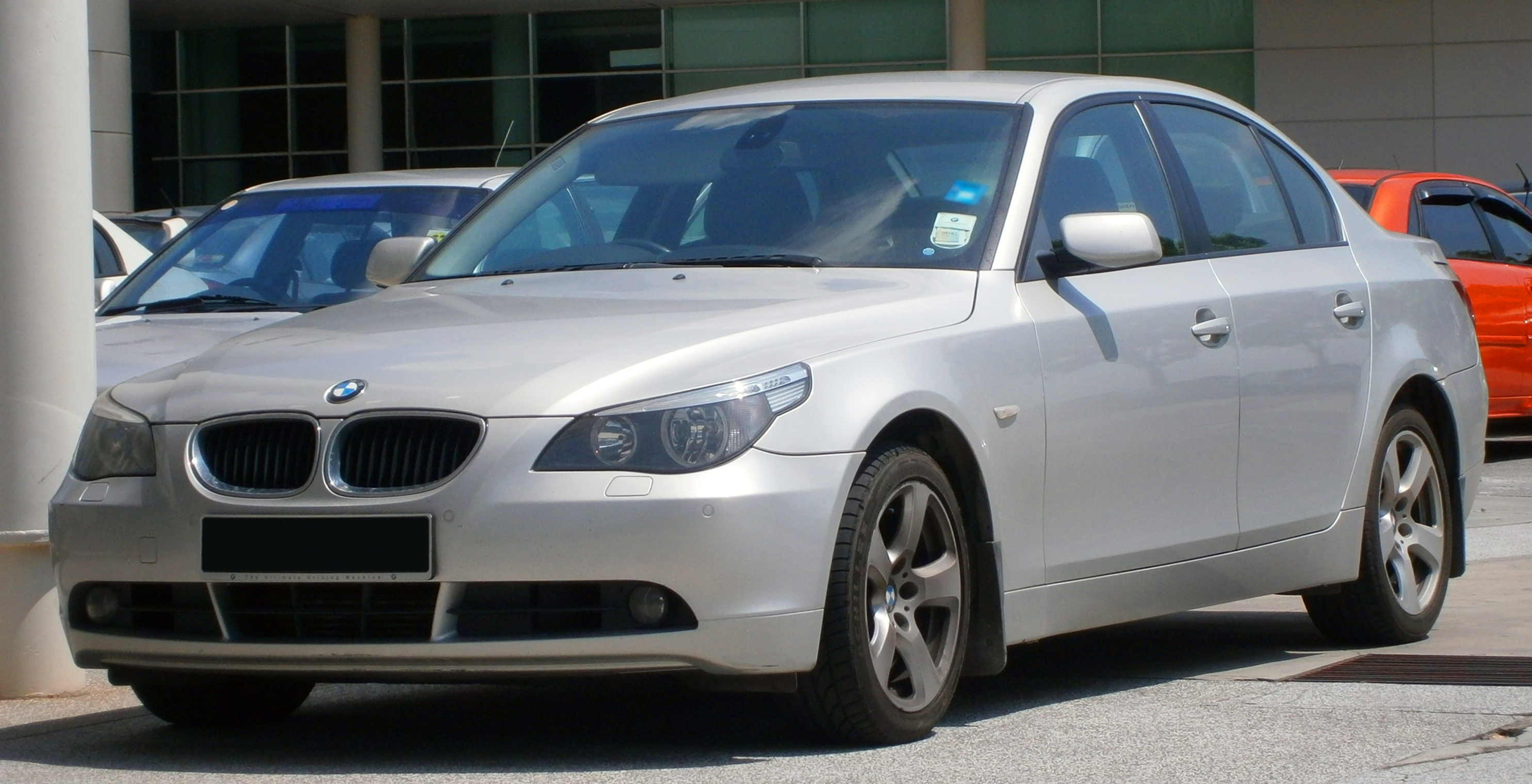
Pre-facelift front

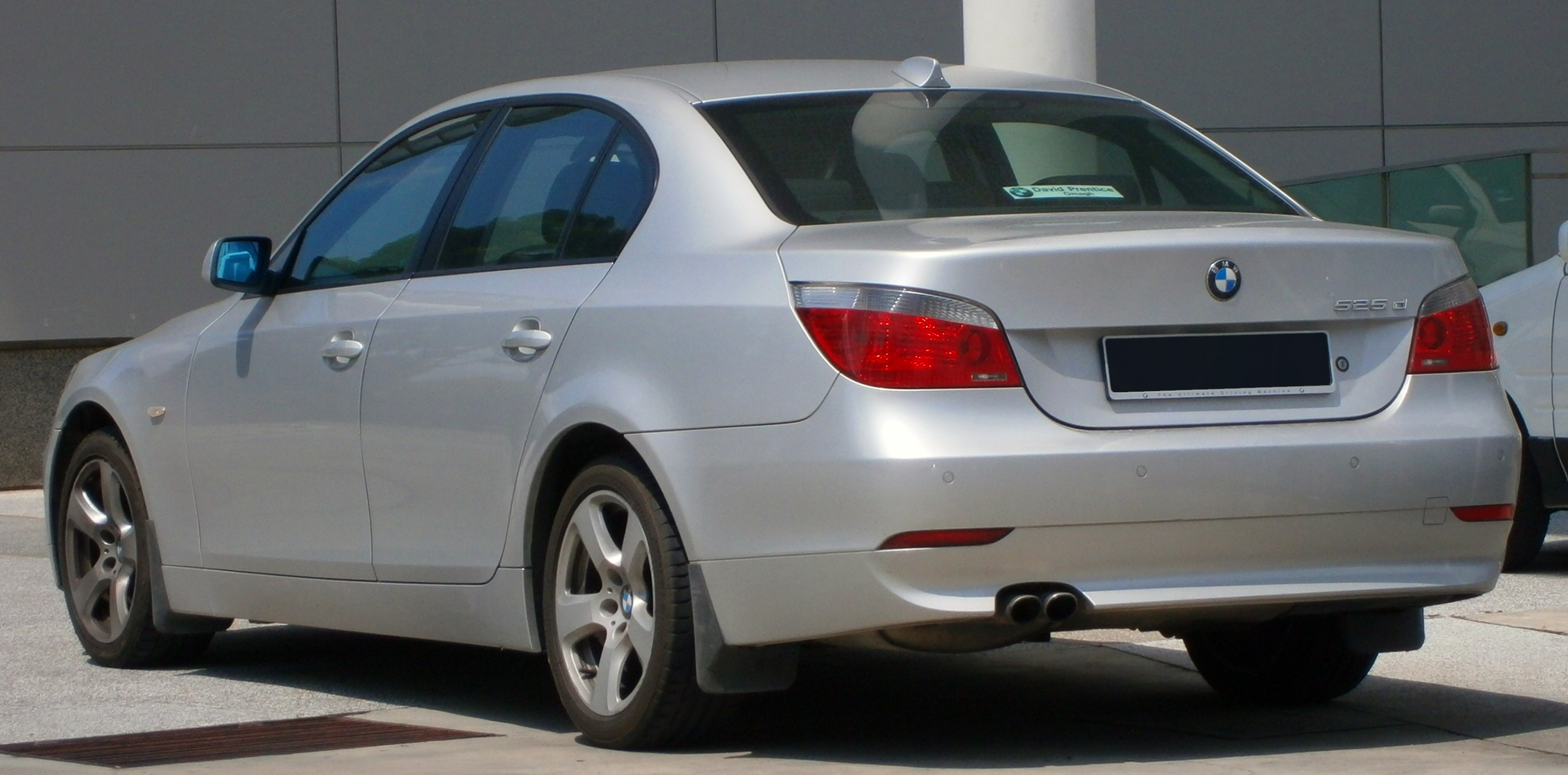
Pre-facelift rear
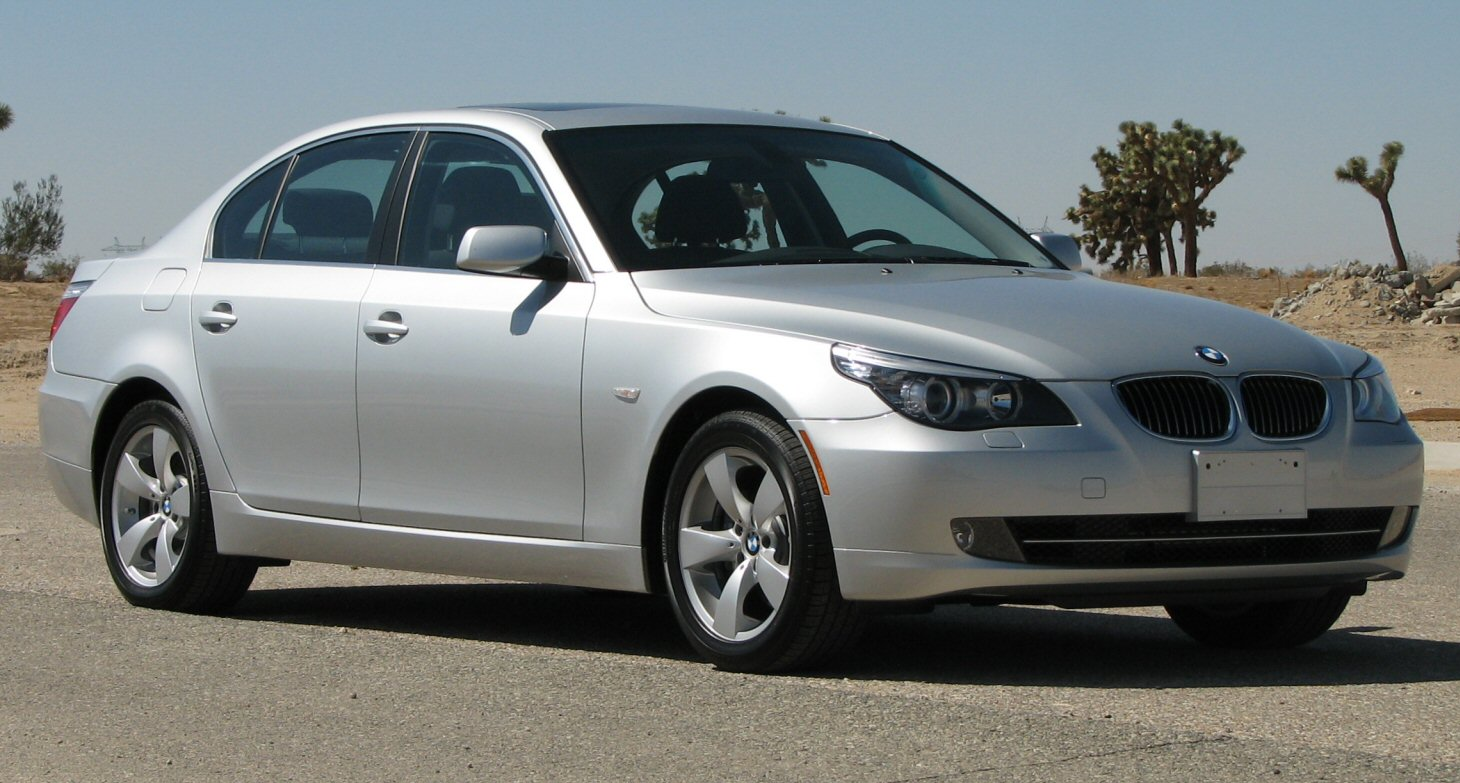
Post-facelift front

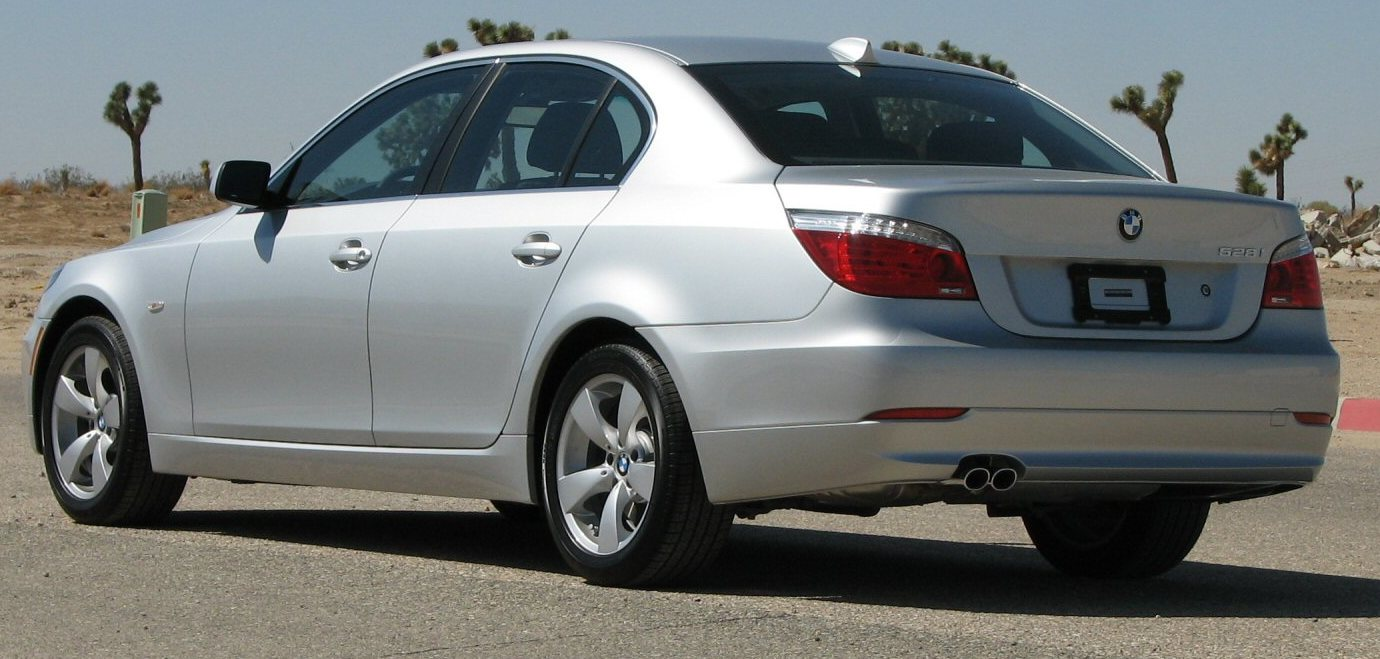
Post-facelift rear

== Production ==
Production of the E60/E61 occurred at the BMW Group Plant Dingolfing in Germany and at the BMW Brilliance plant in China.

Complete knock-down assembly of German-produced kits took place in Thailand, Egypt, Russia and Malaysia.

Yearly production figures
Year	Total	Saloon	Touring	Notes
2003	70,522	70,522	-	Saloon launched in July.
2004	229,598	191,361	31,342	Touring model launched in May.
2005	228,389	177,719	50,670	
2006	232,193	182,539	49,654	
2007	230,845	181,534	49,311	
2008	202,287	156,825	45,462	
2009	175,983	135,944	36,987	
Total	1,369,817	1,096,444	263,426	
