= BMW M57 =

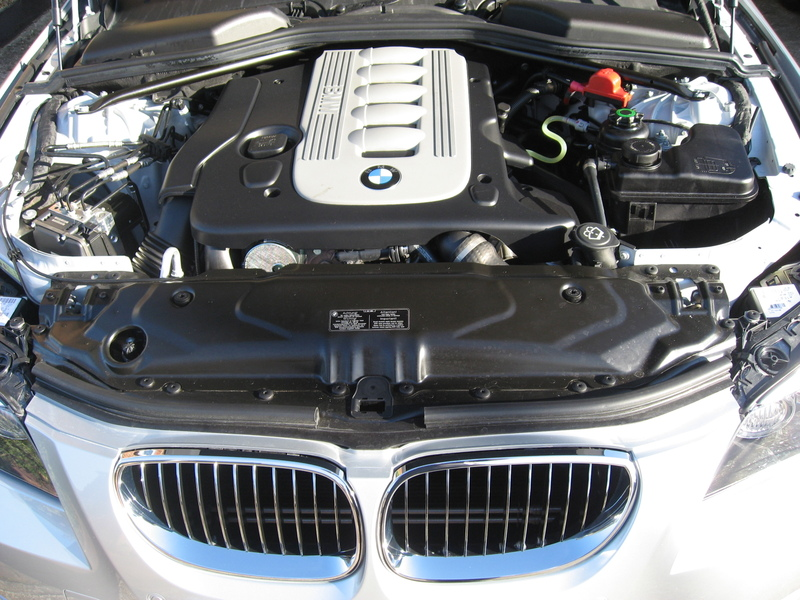

Overview
- Manufacturer: BMW
- Production: 1998–2013

Layout
- Configuration: Inline-6
- Displacement: 2,497 cc (152.4 cu in); 2,926 cc (178.6 cu in); 2,993 cc (182.6 cu in)
- Cylinder bore: 80 mm (3.15 in); 84 mm (3.31 in)
- Piston stroke: 75.1 mm (2.96 in); 82.8 mm (3.26 in); 88 mm (3.46 in); 90 mm (3.54 in)
- Cylinder block material: Cast iron Aluminum (TÜ2 onwards)
- Valvetrain: DOHC
- Compression ratio: 16.5-18.0:1

RPM range
- Max. engine speed: 4750

Combustion
- Turbocharger: Single Garrett or BorgWarner twin-turbochargers with intercooler
- Fuel system: Common rail direct injection
- Management: Bosch DDE 4.0, 5.0, 6.0 or 7.3 (US Models)
- Fuel type: Diesel fuel (DIN EN 590)
- Cooling system: Water-cooled

Output
- Power output: 120–210 kW (161–282 hp)
- Torque output: 350–580 N⋅m (258–428 lb⋅ft)

Chronology
- Predecessor: BMW M51
- Successor: BMW N57

Sound of the engine in a BMW E39

The BMW M57 is a straight-6 diesel engine produced from 1998 up to 2013 in BMW's Upper Austrian engine plant in Steyr.

== Description ==
The M57 is a water-cooled and turbocharged inline six cylinder diesel engine with common rail injection. It was revised twice during its production time. It is based on its predecessor M51. The block and the crankcase of the first M57 engines and the TÜ (Technische Überarbeitung = technical revision) engines are made of cast iron, whilst the TÜ2 engines are made of aluminium instead. The combustion chamber was also changed in the TÜ2. The injection pressure is 1,350 bar (19,600 psi) in the non TÜ engine, whilst all other engines use a pressure of 1,600 bar (23,000 psi). For fuel injection, magnetic injectors are used, except from the TÜ2 OL and TOP engines, which make use of piezo injectors. The common-rail-system is made by Bosch and also controlled by a Bosch DDE 4 ECU for non TÜ and DDE 5 ECU for TÜ. All models are equipped with turbocharger and an intercooler. The 2.9L M57, which is found in E39 530d and E38 730d, as well as early models of E46 330d and E53 X5, is equipped with one Garrett GT2556V turbocharger. The 2.5L M57 non TÜ uses a Garrett GT2052V turbocharger, the 2.5L M57TÜ uses a Garrett GT2056V turbocharger, the 3.0L M57TÜ a Garrett GT2260V turbocharger, the M57TÜ2 a Garrett GTB2260VK turbocharger, whilst the M57D30TÜTOP sports a BorgWarner KP39 high-pressure and a K26 low-pressure turbocharger. The compression ratio reaches from 16.5:1 to 18.0:1, M57 engines with higher power output and more than one turbocharger have a lower compression ratio. Every cylinder has two inlet and two exhaust valves as well as two chain-driven overhead camshafts. The redline is 4750 rpm.

== Technical data ==
Version	Displacement	Power	Torque	Year
M57D25	2,497 cc (152.4 cu in)	110 kW (148 hp) @ 4000 rpm	300 N⋅m (221 lb⋅ft) @ 1750 rpm	2001
M57D25	2,497 cc (152.4 cu in)	120 kW (161 hp) @ 4000 rpm	350 N⋅m (258 lb⋅ft) @ 2000–2500 rpm	2000
M57D25TÜ	2,497 cc (152.4 cu in)	120 kW (161 hp) @ 4000 rpm	400 N⋅m (295 lb⋅ft) @ 2000–2750 rpm	2004
M57D25TÜ	2,497 cc (152.4 cu in)	130 kW (174 hp) @ 4000 rpm	400 N⋅m (295 lb⋅ft) @ 2000–2750 rpm	2004
M57D30	2,926 cc (178.6 cu in)	135 kW (181 hp) @ 4000 rpm	390 N⋅m (288 lb⋅ft) @ 1750–3200 rpm	1998
M57D30	2,926 cc (178.6 cu in)	135 kW (181 hp) @ 4000 rpm	410 N⋅m (302 lb⋅ft) @ 2000–3000 rpm	1998
M57D30	2,926 cc (178.6 cu in)	142 kW (190 hp) @ 4000 rpm	430 N⋅m (317 lb⋅ft) @ 1750–3000 rpm	2000
M57D30TÜ	2,993 cc (182.6 cu in)	150 kW (201 hp) @ 4000 rpm	410 N⋅m (302 lb⋅ft) @ 1500–3250 rpm	2003
M57D30TÜ	2,993 cc (182.6 cu in)	160 kW (215 hp) @ 4000 rpm	500 N⋅m (369 lb⋅ft) @ 2000–2750 rpm	2002
M57D30TÜ	2,993 cc (182.6 cu in)	200 kW (268 hp) @ 4400 rpm	560 N⋅m (413 lb⋅ft) @ 2000–2250 rpm	2004
M57D30TÜ2	2,993 cc (182.6 cu in)	145 kW (194 hp) @ 4000 rpm	400 N⋅m (295 lb⋅ft) @ 1300–3250 rpm	2006
M57D30TÜ2	2,993 cc (182.6 cu in)	170 kW (228 hp) @ 4000 rpm	500 N⋅m (369 lb⋅ft) @ 1750–3000 rpm	2005
M57D30TÜ2	2,993 cc (182.6 cu in)	170 kW (228 hp) @ 4000 rpm	520 N⋅m (384 lb⋅ft) @ 2000–2750 rpm	2005
M57D30TÜ2	2,993 cc (182.6 cu in)	173 kW (232 hp) @ 4000 rpm	500 N⋅m (369 lb⋅ft) @ 1750–3000 rpm	2007
M57D30TÜ2	2,993 cc (182.6 cu in)	173 kW (232 hp) @ 4000 rpm	520 N⋅m (384 lb⋅ft) @ 2000–2750 rpm	2007
M57D30TÜ2	2,993 cc (182.6 cu in)	210 kW (282 hp) @ 4400 rpm	580 N⋅m (428 lb⋅ft) @ 2000–2250 rpm	2006

== Application ==
=== M57D25 ===
Bore x stroke: 80 mm × 82.8 mm (3.15 in × 3.26 in)

- 2000 - 2003 in the BMW E39 525d 120 kW (163 PS; 161 hp)
- 2001 - 2003 in the Opel Omega B 2.5DTI 110 kW (150 PS; 148 hp)

=== M57D25TÜ ===
Bore x stroke: 84 mm × 75.1 mm (3.31 in × 2.96 in)

- 2003 - 2007 in the BMW E60/E61 525d 120 kW (161 hp) or 130 kW (174 hp)

=== M57D30 ===
Bore x stroke: 84 mm × 88 mm (3.31 in × 3.46 in)

- 130 kW (174 hp) and 390 N⋅m (288 lb⋅ft)
  - in the Range Rover (L322)
- 135 kW (181 hp) and 390 N⋅m (288 lb⋅ft)
  - in the E39 as 530d
  - in the E46 as 330d/330xd
- 135 kW (181 hp) and 410 N⋅m (302 lb⋅ft)
  - in the E38 as 730d
  - in the E53 as X5 3.0d
- 142 kW (190 hp) and 410 N⋅m (302 lb⋅ft)
  - in the E39 as 530d
- 142 kW (190 hp) and 430 N⋅m (317 lb⋅ft)
  - in the E38 as 730d

=== M57D30TÜ ===
Bore x stroke: 84 mm × 90 mm (3.31 in × 3.54 in)

- 150 kW (201 hp) and 410 N⋅m (302 lb⋅ft)
- E46 automatic gearbox was software limited to 390 N⋅m (288 lb⋅ft)
  - in the E46 as 330d/330Cd/330xd
  - in the E83 as X3 3.0d
- 160 kW (215 hp) and 500 N⋅m (369 lb⋅ft)
  - in the E53 as X5 3.0d
  - in the E60/E61 as 530d/530xd
  - in the E65/E66 as 730d

=== M57D30TÜ TOP ===
Bore x stroke: 84 mm × 90 mm (3.31 in × 3.54 in)

- 200 kW (268 hp) and 560 N⋅m (413 lb⋅ft)
  - in the E60/E61 as 535d
  - in the E63/E64 as 635d

=== M57D30TÜ2 ===
Bore x stroke: 84 mm × 90 mm (3.31 in × 3.54 in)

- 145 kW (194 hp) and 400 N⋅m (295 lb⋅ft)
  - in the E90/E91/E92/E93 as 325d
  - in the E60/E61 as 525d/525xd
- 160 kW (215 hp) and 500 N⋅m (369 lb⋅ft)
  - in the E83 as X3 3.0d
- 170 kW (228 hp) and 500–520 N⋅m (369–384 lb⋅ft)
  - in the E65/E66 as 730d
  - in the E90/E91/E92/E93 as 330d/330xd
  - in the E60/E61 as 530d/530xd
- 173 kW (232 hp) and 500–520 N⋅m (369–384 lb⋅ft)
  - in the E60/E61 as 530d
  - in the E70 as X5 3.0d
  - in the E71 as X6 3.0d

=== M57D30TÜ2 TOP ===
Bore x stroke: 84 mm × 90 mm (3.31 in × 3.54 in)

- 210 kW (282 hp) and 580 N⋅m (428 lb⋅ft)
  - in the E60/E61 as 535d
  - in the E63/E64 as 635d
  - in the E70 as X5 3.0sd and X5 xDrive35d
  - in the E71 as X6 xDrive35d
  - in the E83 as X3 3.0sd
  - in the E90/E91/E92 as 335d

== See also ==
- List of BMW engines
