= Active steering =

Type of motor vehicle steering device

Active steering describes a steering system for a vehicle in which the relationship between the driver’s steer inputs and the angle of the steered road wheels may be continuously and intelligently altered. Whilst active steering systems may be found in agricultural equipment and heavy plant, this article concentrates on the application of active steering in BMW passenger cars.

Active steering describes a type of power electric variable gear ratio power steering technology introduced by BMW in 2003 first appearing on the redesigned 5 Series which varies the degree that the wheels turn in response to the steering wheel. At lower speeds, this technology reduces the amount that the steering wheel must be turned – improving performance in situations such as parking and other urban area traffic maneuvers. At higher speeds, the performance is such that increased responsiveness from speed is avoided, improving directional stability.

== Overview ==
The BMW active steering system utilizes a double planetary gear system located at the base of the steering column to facilitate driver independent steering of the front wheels. The system is intended to offer two principal benefits; a variable steering ratio and stability-enhancing corrective steering actions.

== BMW System Mechanical Layout ==
The BMW active steering system consists principally of a power-assisted rack and pinion steering gear, a double planetary gear system in the steering column, and an electric actuating motor.

The double planetary gear system incorporates an input sun gear connected to the driver’s steering wheel, two planetary gears, an output sun gear connected to the steering pinion, and a rotating housing. If the housing is held still, the driver’s steer inputs are translated from the input sun gear, through the planetary gears (sharing a common lay shaft) to the output sun gear with a net 1:1 ratio. I.e. if the planetary gear housing is held still, conventional steering operation is retained. This characteristic provides a means of steering the vehicle in the event of an active steering system failure.

The planetary gear housing features external gear teeth and can be rotated by a motor and worm gear. Alteration of the housing position allows rotation of the output sun gear independently of the input sun gear position. I.e. if the driver were to hold the steering wheel (and therefore the input sun gear) stationary, driving the planetary gear housing will result in the rotation of the steering pinion (and therefore a steering action at the front wheels). By manipulating the position of the planetary gear housing, the active steering ECU can synthesize a variable steering ratio or generate steering actions independently of the driver.

== Variable steering ratio ==
In a parking situation, the computer varies the ratio so that the steering wheel needs fewer than two full turns to move the wheels lock to lock. As vehicle speeds increase, the steering ratio increases, so it takes larger movements of the steering wheel to move the wheels and that lessens the usually increasing vehicle response resulting from increased speed.

== Corrective steering ==
In addition to providing a variable steering ratio, the BMW active steering system is also capable of generating corrective steering actions to enhance vehicle yaw stability. Unlike conventional brake actuated stability control, corrective steering actions occur in a continuous manner and its operation is often not perceived by the driver. Furthermore; the elimination of brake intervention allows yaw stability control without loss of forward speed, thus vehicle performance is improved.

In the event of oversteer, the active steering system creates a countersteering action thus reducing the yaw moment and yaw rate. In extreme oversteer cases, active steering works in conjunction with conventional brake actuated stability control for maximum effect. In the event of understeer, further increasing the front wheel slip angle does not generate additional lateral force at the front axle, therefore active steering is not helpful.

The corrective steering function is de-activated (along with the brake actuated stability control system) by pressing a dash-mounted switch. This allows the driver full control over the front wheel steer angle and is intended for use in extreme recreational driving (e.g. on track days). The variable steering ratio remains active.

== Safety ==
If an error or problem occurs in the electronics, the computer shuts down the operation of the electric motor, locking the ring gear of the planetary gear set and making it fixed-ratio steering.

== See also ==
- Variable gear ratio
- ZF Friedrichshafen
