= Engine downsizing =

In the automotive industry, engine downsizing is the practice of utilizing smaller combustion engines over larger ones of the same power capacity when manufacturing vehicles. It is the result of car manufacturers attempting to provide more efficient vehicles that emit fewer emissions, often mandated by legislative standards. The term generally relates to traditional internal combustion engines powered by petrol or diesel.

Many manufacturers are reducing engine displacement and the number of cylinders. By adding a forced aspiration device (turbocharger or supercharger) and direct injection technology, they provide a powerful engine with similar performance to a much larger engine, but with much improved efficiency and reduced carbon emissions. A smaller engine is also often lighter, so less overall energy is expended while driving. Reducing the number of cylinders also reduces the amount of friction in the engine, increasing the efficiency.

Some observers have not been convinced by manufacturer's claims that reducing engine size provides a more efficient car. Some tests have shown that some downsize engines have lower fuel economy in everyday driving than the larger engines they replace.

== Recent research and progress ==
The University of Bath published research carried out by its Powertrain and Vehicle Research Centre which demonstrated that it is possible to reduce engine capacity by 60% and still achieve the torque curve of a modern, large-capacity naturally-aspirated engine, while encompassing the attributes necessary to employ such a concept in premium vehicles.

== Reliability ==
In an Auto Bild investigation of a 1.0 EcoBoost Ford Focus having driven 100,000 kilometres (62,000 mi), no major issues were found surrounding the engine, with only 'minimal oil sweating between cylinder and block' being noticed. However, the turbocharged Audi 2.0 TFSI petrol engine has frequently been reported to suffer from more severe oil leakage around the cylinder seals, with up to 1 liter of oil consumed per 300 kilometres (190 mi). Similar issues have been reported for Volkswagen Group 1.4 and 1.8 TFSI engines. According to a J.D. Power survey, downsize engines scored significantly lower in reliability than older engines.

== Examples ==
- The Volkswagen Group replaced their 1.6 and 2.0 litre gasoline engines in the late 2000s with the 1.4 TSI unit. It was launched at the 2005 Frankfurt Motor Show in a 125 kW (170 PS) version using both a turbocharger and a supercharger. Its fuel consumption was 5% lower than the previous 2.0 FSI, despite the increased horsepower throughout the revving range. Later the engine was sold in several versions from 122 to 180 PS, some of them with only the turbocharger.
- In Europe and later in North America Ford launched their new EcoBoost three-cylinder 1-litre engine to the Ford Focus in 2012, to replace the 1.6-litre and producing the same 123 bhp (92 kW; 125 PS).
- Since 2011, BMW has started using 2.0 litre four-cylinder engines instead of 3.0-litre six-cylinder engines, such as the N20 replacing the N52 and N53 engines.
- Mercedes-Benz has equipped several models with small 1.8-litre four-cylinder engines in lieu of larger V6 engines.
- The Renault R-Type engine is a turbo-charged 1.6 liter diesel engine replacing a 1.9 liter engine with similar performance characteristics.

== See also ==
- Variable displacement – downsizes the engine by way of cylinder deactivation under light load to improve fuel economy
