= ZF S6-37 transmission =

Type of manual transmission

The ZF S6-37 is a 6-speed manual transmission manufactured by ZF Friedrichshafen AG. It is designed for longitudinal engine applications, and is rated to handle up to 370 newton-metres (273 lbf⋅ft) of torque.

Gear ratios (37BZ for gasoline-powered engines):

1	2	3	4	5	6	R
4.350	2.496	1.665	1.234	1.000	0.851	3.926

Gear ratios (37DZ for diesel-powered engines)

1	2	3	4	5	6
5.14	2.83	1.79	1.26	1.00	0.83

== Applications ==
Rear-wheel-drive:

Gasoline:

GS6-37BZ — THEA

- BMW Z4 E85 (3.0i, 3.0i (M54))

GS6-37BZ — TJEE

- BMW Z4M E85/E86

GS6-37BZ — TJES

- BMW 1 E81/E87/E87 LCI (130i)
- BMW Z4 E85/E86 (3.0si)

GS6-37BZ — TJEP

- BMW 120i E87
- BMW 3 Series 330i E90 (N52)/330i E91 (N52)/330i E92 (N52N)
- BMW 5 Series 530i E60 (N52)/530i E61 (530i)
- BMW 6 Series E63/E64 (630i)

GS6-37BZ — THEG

- BMW E46 (325ti, 330i/Ci)
- BMW E60 (520i, 525i (M54), 530i (M54))
- BMW E61 (525i)

Diesel:

GS6-37DZ — TJEF

- BMW E81/E82/E87 LCI/E88 (120d)
- BMW E90 (320d, 320d N47)
- BMW E90 LCI/E91/E91 LCI (320d N47)
- BMW E92/E93 (320d)
- BMW E60 LCI (520d, 520d N47)
- BMW E61 LCI (520d N47)

GS6-37DZ — TJEJ

- BMW E81/E82/E87 LCI/E88 (120d)
- BMW E90 (320d, 320d N47)
- BMW E90 LCI/E91/E91 LCI (320d N47)
- BMW E92/E93 (320d)
- BMW X1 sDrive20d E84 (N47)

GS6-37DZ — TJEM

- BMW E87 (118d, 120d)
- BMW 320Cd E46
- BMW E90/E91 (318d (M47N2), 320d (M47N2))
- BMW E60/E61 (520d)
- BMW E60 LCI/E61 LCI (520d (M47N2))

GS6-37DZ — THES

- BMW 120d E87
- BMW E46 (320Cd/td, 320d (M47N))
- BMW E90/E91 (320d M47N2)
- BMW E60/E61 (520d)

All-wheel-drive:

Gasoline:

GS6X37BZ — TJEN

- BMW E90 (325xi, 325xi (N52), 325xi (N52N), 325xi (N53), 328xi N51, 328xi (N52N), 330xi, 330xi (N52), 330xi (N53))
- BMW E90 LCI (325xi, 325xi (N52N), 325xi (N53), 328xi (N51), 328xi (N52N) 30xi)
- BMW E91 (325xi, 325xi (N52), 325xi (N52N), 325xi (N53), 328xi, 330xi (N52), 330xi (N53))
- BMW E91 LCI (325xi (N52N), 325xi (N53), 328xi, 330xi)
- BMW E92 (325xi (N52N), 325xi (N53), 328xi (N51), 328xi (N52N), 330xi (N52N), 330xi (N53))
- BMW E92 LCI (325xi (N52N), 325xi (N53), 328xi (N51), 328xi (N52N), 330xi)

GS6X37BZ — THEW

- BMW 330xi E46

GS6X37BZ — TJEO

- BMW E60/E61 (525xi, 530xi)
- BMW E60 LCI (525xi, 528xi, 530xi, 530xi (N52N), 530xi (N53))
- BMW E61 LCI (525xi, 530xi (N52N), 530xi (N53))
- BMW X3 E83 LCI (2.5si, 3.0i, 3.0si).

GS6X37BZ — THRH

- BMW X3 E83/LCI (2.0i)

GS6X37BZ — THET

- BMW X3 E83 (2.5i, 3.0i)

GS6X37BZ — THRF

- BMW X3 E83 LCI (2.5si, 3.0i, 3.0si).

GS6X37BZ — THEX

- BMW X5 3.0i E53

Diesel models:

GS6X37DZ — TJEU

- BMW E90 LCI/E91 LCI (320xd N47)
- BMW E92 320xd
- BMW X1 E84 (18dX (N47), 20dX (N47)).

GS6X37DZ — THRD / THRJ

- BMW X3 2.0d E83
- BMW X3 2.0d E83 LCI (M47N2).

GS6X37DZ — THRG

- BMW X3 E83 LCI (1.8d, 2.0d, 2.0d (N47)).

== General references ==
- http://www.zf.com/corporate/en/products/product_range/cars/cars_manual_6_speed_transmission.shtml
- http://www.bmwclub.lv/files/05_E85_Driveline.pdf https://www.bimmerfest.ru/korobka-peredach-gs6-37/
