= ZF S6-53 transmission =

6-speed manual transmission

The ZF S6-53 is a 6-speed manual transmission manufactured by ZF Friedrichshafen AG. It is designed for longitudinal engine applications, and is rated to handle up to 600 newton-metres (443 lbf⋅ft) of torque.

== Specifications ==
The gearbox uses an input, main, and layshaft configuration. Idler gears for speeds 1, 2, and 6 are on the layshaft while idler gears for 3 and 4 are on the main shaft. Gear 5 is direct drive. The main and layshafts are hollow for weight savings. The shafts are supported by a combination of ball and roller bearings. For all six forward gears and reverse, the ZF S6-53 uses synchronizers, with one to three cones clutches depending on the gear.

The gear engagement is configured differently than many other rear-wheel drive manual transmissions. Instead of using one rod as gear selector and two more rods to move the forks, the S6-53 uses a single rod to move the four forks, which are hinged on two screws in the gearbox case. While a given fork is actuated, ball detents and pins inhibit movement of the other forks.

The bell housing and case of the unit are made of die cast aluminum. Installed on the transmission are a Hall-effect sensor for input rpm, an oil temperature sensor, a reverse engagement sensor, a neutral sensor, and an electric oil pump. At high temperatures, the car's engine control unit activates the pump, sending the oil to a heat exchanger for cooling.

The transmission weighs approximately 50 kg (110 lb).

Capacities
Model	Input torque
S6-37	370 N⋅m (270 lb⋅ft)
S6-45	470 N⋅m (350 lb⋅ft)
S6-53	600 N⋅m (440 lb⋅ft)

Gear ratios
Model	1	2	3	4	5	6	R
GS6-53BZ	4.055	2.396	1.582	1.192	1.000	0.872	3.677
GS6-53DZ	5.080	2.804	1.783	1.260	1.000	0.835	4.607
GS6L40LZ	4.110	2.248	1.403	1.000	0.786	0.601	3.727
GS6L50TZ	4.110	2.315	1.542	1.179	1.000	0.846	3.727
Jaguar S Type 2.7D	4.680	2.530	1.690	1.220	1.000	0.837	4.240
Jaguar F Type 3.0	4.11	2.315	1.542	1.179	1.000	0.846	3.727

== Applications ==
The transmission is used in the following applications:

=== Rear-wheel-drive ===
==== Gasoline ====
===== GS6-L55TZ =====
BMW M Series

- BMW M2 (2023)
- BMW M3 (2021–2023)
- BMW M4 (2021–2023)

===== GS6-53BZ =====
Alfa Romeo Giulia Quadrifoglio

- 952 (2016–2017)

BMW 1 Series

- E82 (135i N54 pre-LCI)

BMW 3 Series

- E90 (335i N54 pre-LCI/M3)
- E91 (335i N54 pre-LCI)
- E92 (335i N54 pre-LCI/M3)
- E93 (335i N54 pre-LCI/M3)
- M3 (E90/92/93)
- M3 (G80)

BMW 4 Series

- M4 (G82/83)

BMW 5 Series

- E60 (535i N54 pre-LCI/540i/545i/550i)
- E61 (545i/550i)
- F10 (550i/M5)
- F11 (550i)

BMW 6 Series

- E63 (645i/650i)
- E64 (645i/650i)

Gran Coupe

- F06 (M6)
- F12 (650i/M6)
- F13 (650i/M6)

BMW Z Series

- Z4 E89 (sDrive35i)

===== GS6L40LZ =====
BMW Z Series

- Z4 G29 (sDrive20i)

===== GS6L50TZ =====
- Toyota GR Supra (J29/DB) (Note: Toyota modified GS6L40LZ with iMT Technology and calibration)

==== Diesel ====
===== GS6-53DZ =====
BMW 1 Series

- E81/E82/E87/E88 (123d) JGG

BMW 3 Series

- E46 (330d/330Cd) HGA
- E90/E91/E92/E93 (325d/330d)

BMW 5 Series HGE/HGY

- E60 (525d/530d)
- E61 (520d/525d/530d)
- F10 (530d)
- F11 (530d)

=== All-wheel-drive ===
==== GS6X53DZ ====
BMW 3 Series

- E46 (330xd)
- E90/E91/E92 (335xi pre-LCI N54)

BMW 5 Series

- E60/E61 (525xd/530xd/535xi)

BMW X Series JGB

- X3 E83 (3.0d)
- X5 E53 (3.0d)

== See also ==
- ZF S6-37 transmission
