= BMW 6 Series (E63) =

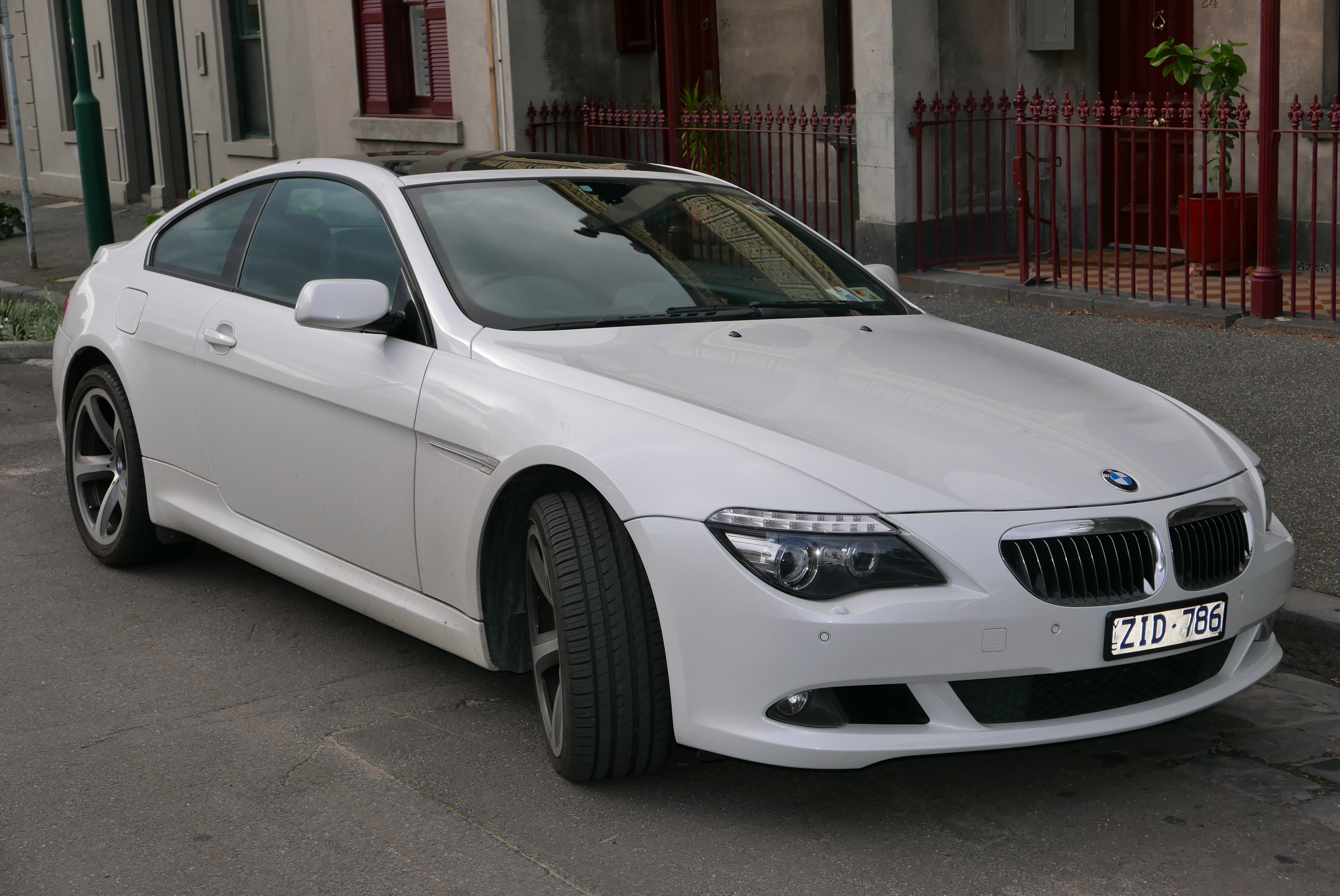

Overview
- Manufacturer: BMW
- Model code: E63 (Coupé); E64 (Convertible)
- Production: July 5, 2003–2010
- Assembly: Germany: Dingolfing
- Designer: Adrian van Hooydonk

Body and chassis
- Class: Grand tourer (S)
- Body style: 2-door coupé (E63); 2-door convertible (E64)
- Layout: Rear-wheel drive
- Related: BMW 5 Series (E60)

Powertrain
- Engine: Petrol: 3.0 L N52/N53 I6; 4.4—4.8 L N62 V8; 5.0 L S85 V10; Diesel- turbocharged: 3.0 L M57 I6
- Transmission: 6-speed ZF S6-37 manual (630Ci / 630i); 6-speed ZF S6-53 manual (645Ci / 650i /M6 (U.S. only)); 6-speed ZF 6HP19 automatic (630Ci / 630i); 6-speed ZF 6HP26 automatic (635d / 645Ci / 650i); 6-speed ZF 6HP28 automatic (635d LCI / 650i LCI); 6-speed SMG automated manual (630i / 645Ci / 650i); 7-speed SMG III automated manual (M6)

Dimensions
- Wheelbase: 2,780 mm (109.4 in)
- Length: 4,820 mm (189.8 in)
- Width: 1,855 mm (73.0 in)
- Height: 1,374 mm (54.1 in)
- Kerb weight: Coupé: 1,490–1,710 kg (3,285–3,770 lb); Convertible: 1,710–1,930 kg (3,770–4,255 lb)

Chronology
- Predecessor: BMW 6 Series (E24) (nameplate)
- Successor: BMW 6 Series (F12)

The second generation of the BMW 6 Series consists of the BMW E63 (coupe version) and BMW E64 (convertible version) grand tourers. The E63/E64 generation was produced by BMW from 2003 to 2010 and is often collectively referred to as the E63.

The E63 uses a shortened version of the E60 5 Series chassis and subsequently shares many features. The car initially drew criticism, due to its controversial styling and complicated iDrive system.

The M6 model was introduced in 2005 in coupé and convertible body styles. It is powered by the S85 V10 engine shared with the E60 M5. As with the M5, the M6 was available the choice of either an SMG III 7-speed Automated manual transmission, or a traditional 6-speed manual transmission.

In March 2011, the BMW 6 Series (F06/F12/F13) began production as the successor to the E63.

== Development and launch ==
The exterior was designed by Adrian van Hooydonk, based on the 1999 BMW Z9 concept car designed by the then BMW Design Chief Chris Bangle.

The controversial rear styling, first seen on the E65 7 Series, was nicknamed "Bangle Butt" by critics. BMW described the styling philosophy as "flame surfacing", where concave and convex shapes meet to create sharp edges.

To reduce weight, the doors and bonnet are made of aluminium, and the boot and front wings are made of carbon-reinforced plastic.

== Body styles ==
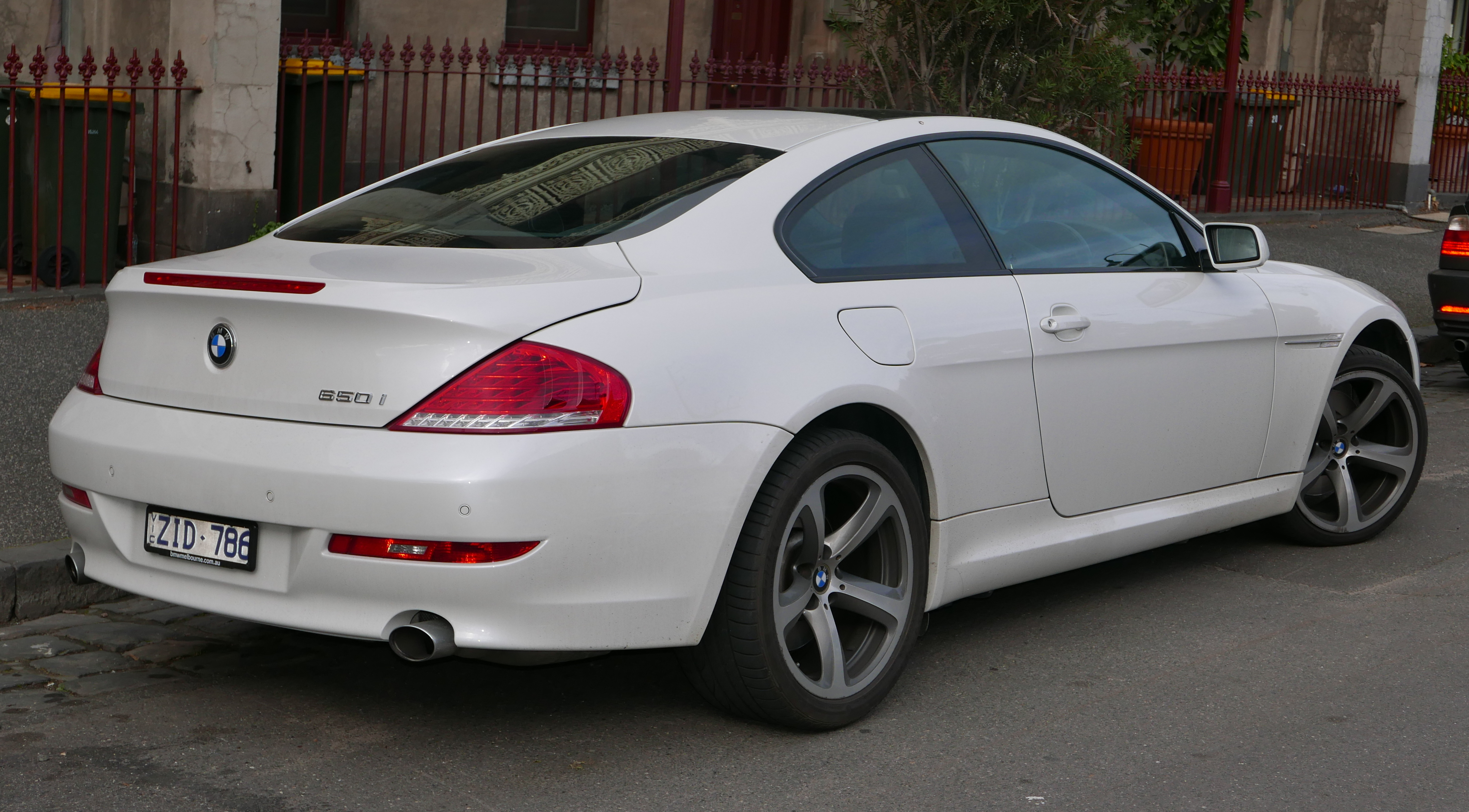
Coupé (E63)

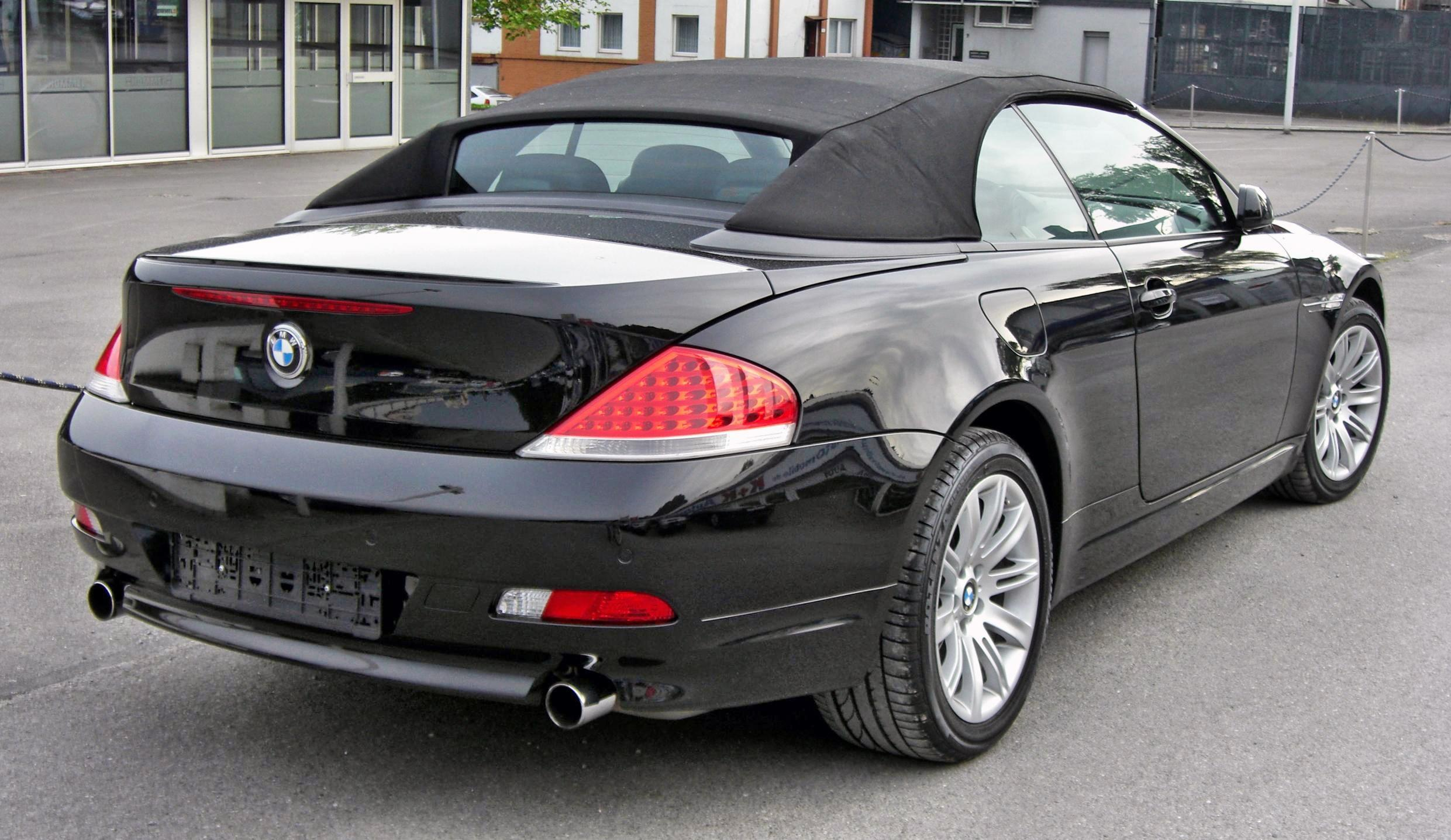
Convertible (E64)

=== Coupé (E63) ===
Coupé models were unveiled at the 2003 Frankfurt Auto Show, and introduced on the market in middle of the 2003 model year.

=== Convertible (E64) ===
Convertible models were unveiled at the 2004 Detroit Auto Show, and released in mid 2004.

Convertible models featured a non-conventional convertible top design with side fins and an integrated wind deflector that can be raised or lowered at any time.

== Engines ==
Top speed for all models is electronically limited to 250 km/h (155 mph).

=== Petrol ===
Model	Years	Engine	Power	Torque
630Ci	2003–2007	3.0 L N52 inline-6	190 kW (258 PS; 255 hp) at 6,600 rpm	300 N⋅m (221 lb⋅ft) at 2,500–4,000 rpm
630i	2007–2010	3.0 L N53 inline-6 (Note: Only sold in countries with low-sulphur fuel)	200 kW (272 PS; 268 hp) at 6,700 rpm	320 N⋅m (236 lb⋅ft) at 2,750–3,000 rpm
630i	2007–2010	3.0 L N52 inline-6 (Note: All other countries)	190 kW (258 PS; 255 hp) at 6,600 rpm	300 N⋅m (221 lb⋅ft) at 2,500–4,000 rpm
645Ci	2003–2005	4.4 L N62; V8	245 kW (333 PS; 329 hp) at 6,100 rpm	450 N⋅m (332 lb⋅ft) at 3,600 rpm
650i	2005–2010	4.8 L N62; V8	270 kW (367 PS; 362 hp) at 6,300 rpm	490 N⋅m (361 lb⋅ft) at 3,400 rpm
M6	2005–2010	5.0 L S85; V10	373 kW (507 PS; 500 hp) at 7,750 rpm	520 N⋅m (384 lb⋅ft) at 6,100 rpm

=== Diesel ===
Model	Years	Engine	Power	Torque
635d (Note: Only sold in Europe)	2007–2010	3.0 L M57 inline-6 turbo	210 kW (286 PS; 282 hp) at 4,400 rpm	580 N⋅m (428 lb⋅ft) at 1,750–2,250 rpm

== Drivetrain ==
The available transmissions are:

- 6-speed ZF S6-37 manual (630Ci / 630i)
- 6-speed ZF S6-53 manual (645Ci / 650i / M6 (U.S. only)
- 6-speed ZF 6HP19 automatic (630Ci / 630i)
- 6-speed ZF 6HP26 automatic (635d / 645Ci / 650i)
- 6-speed ZF 6HP28 automatic (635d LCI / 650i LCI)
- 6-speed SMG (630i / 645Ci / 650i)
- 7-speed SMG III (M6)

Unlike the related E60 5 Series, the E63/E64 was not available with all-wheel drive (xDrive).

== Equipment ==
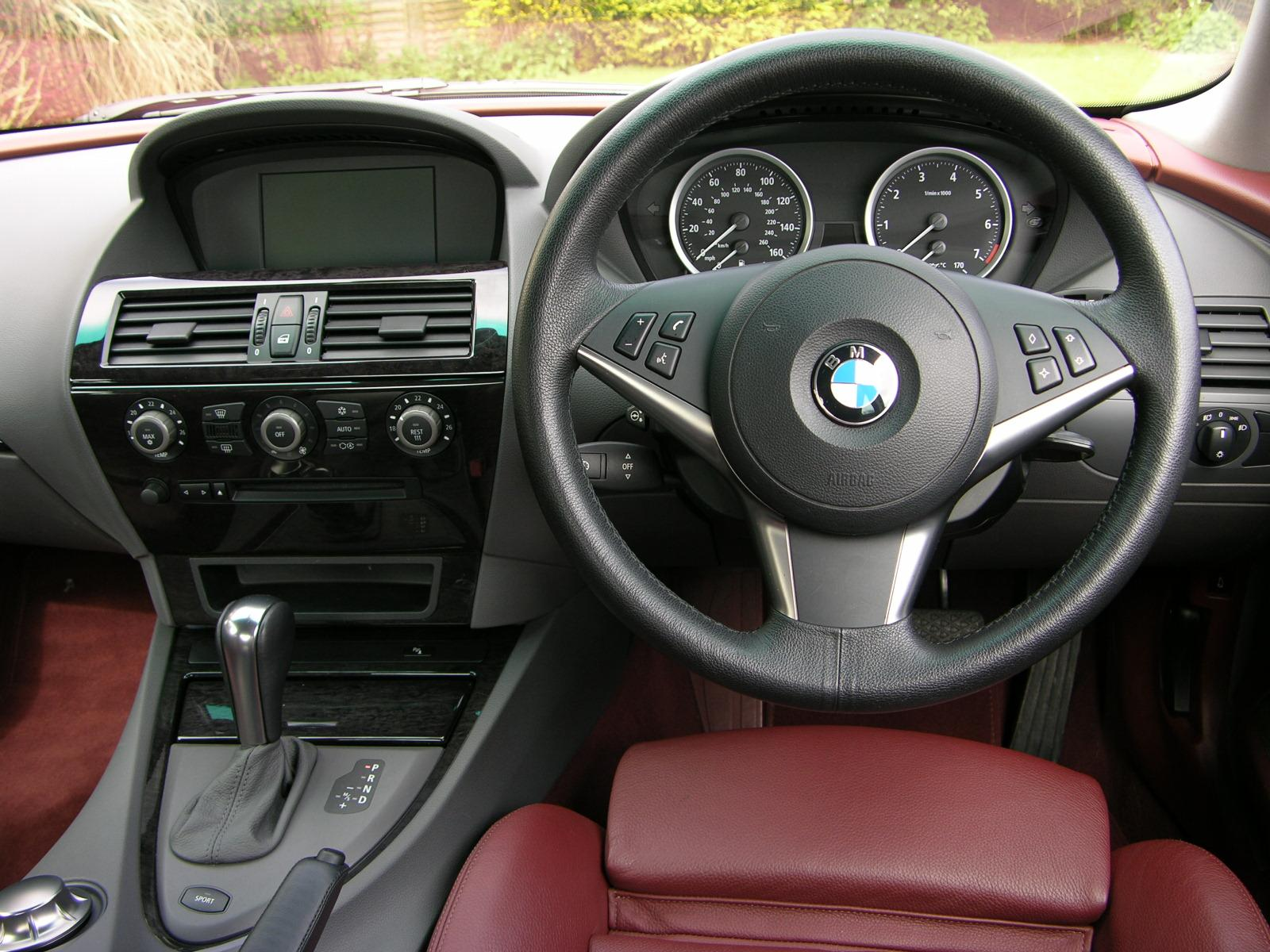
Interior (pre-facelift)

Features available included adaptive headlights, parking sensors (Park Distance Control), voice control, variable rate steering (Active Steering), active anti-roll bars (Active Roll Stabilisation), radar cruise control (Active Cruise Control with Stop and Go), head-up display, lane departure warning, night vision, keyless entry and starting (Comfort Access), heated steering wheel, universal remote control, and soft-close doors.

== M6 model ==
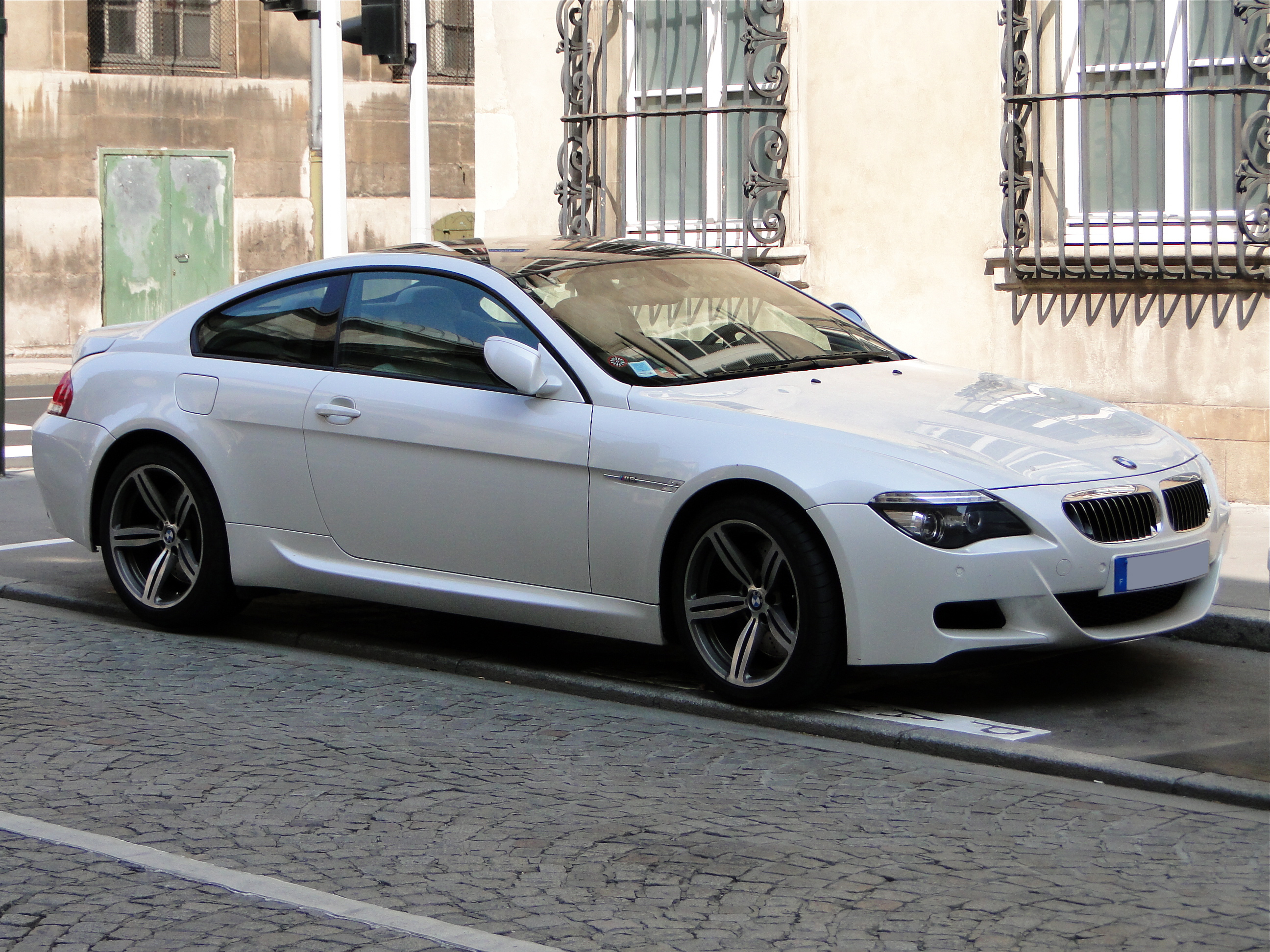
M6 coupé

The M6 version was initially introduced as a coupé at the 2005 Geneva International Motor Show, and later in convertible form at the British International Motor Show in 2006.

The M6 is powered by the 5.0-litre naturally aspirated S85 V10 shared with the E60 M5, generating 373 kW (500 hp) at 7,750 rpm and 520 N⋅m (384 lb⋅ft) at 6,100 rpm. The majority of the cars were produced with a 7-speed automated manual transmission ("SMG III"); however, a 6-speed manual transmission was also available in the United States.

The M6 coupé has a carbon fibre roof in order to reduce weight and for a lower centre of gravity. Additional features included: sports seats, larger front and rear brakes, an M-performance instrument cluster, a carbon-fibre roof (coupé only), and an optional M head-up Display. The car also has quad exhaust-pipes and larger, more aerodynamic air intakes.

A total of 9,087 coupés and 5,065 convertibles were built; amounting to 14,152 cars.

== Yearly changes ==
=== 2006 ===
- 650i model replaces the 645Ci
- M6 model introduced

=== 2007 facelift ===
In September 2007, the facelift (LCI) was introduced for the 2008 model year. Major changes include:

- 635d model introduced, powered by the M57 diesel engine.
- 630i engine upgraded from the N52 to the N53 in countries with low sulphur fuel.
- Exterior design changes including headlights, tail-lights, bumpers, and the third brake light on coupé models was relocated to the trunk lid.
- Interior design changes including updated climate controls, and new electronic gear lever with the ability to change gears manually via steering wheel paddles.
- Edition Sport trim introduced featuring a stiffer anti-roll system and an updated exhaust system for 650i models.
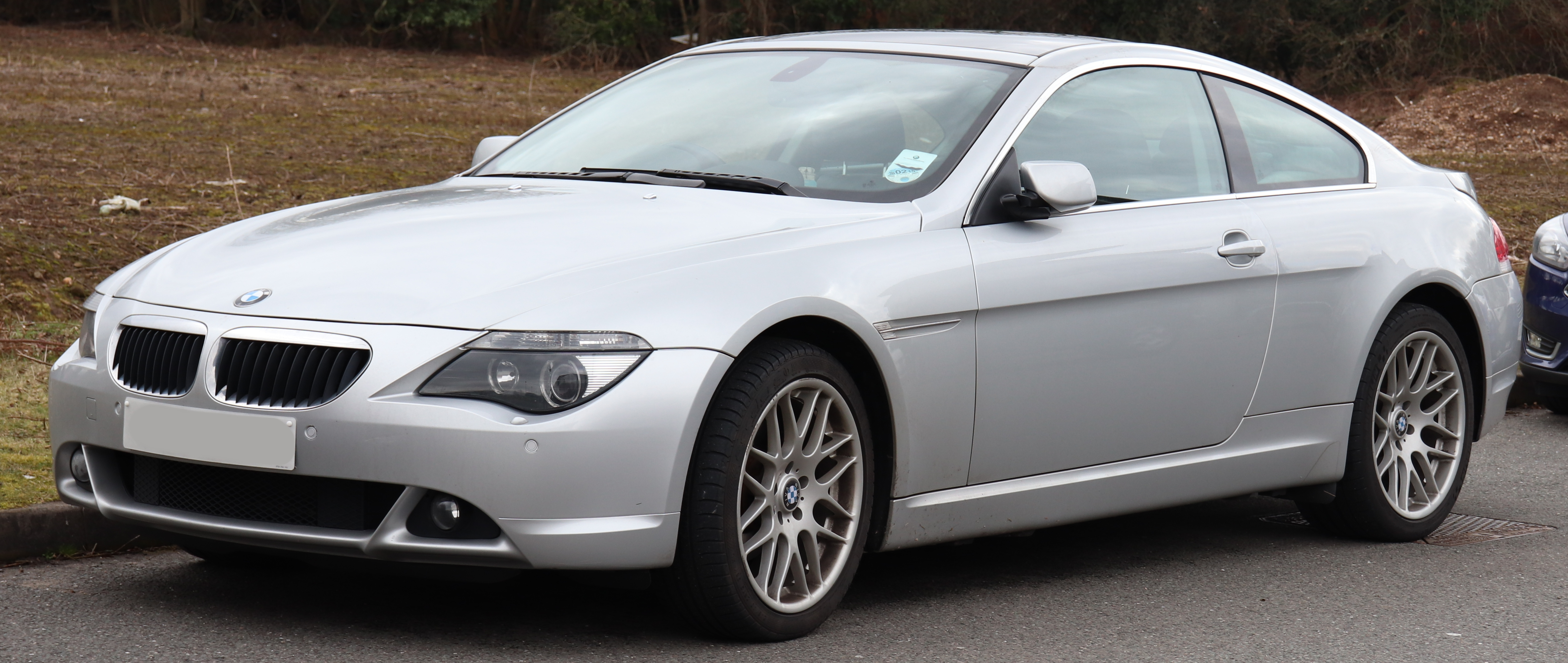
Pre-facelift front

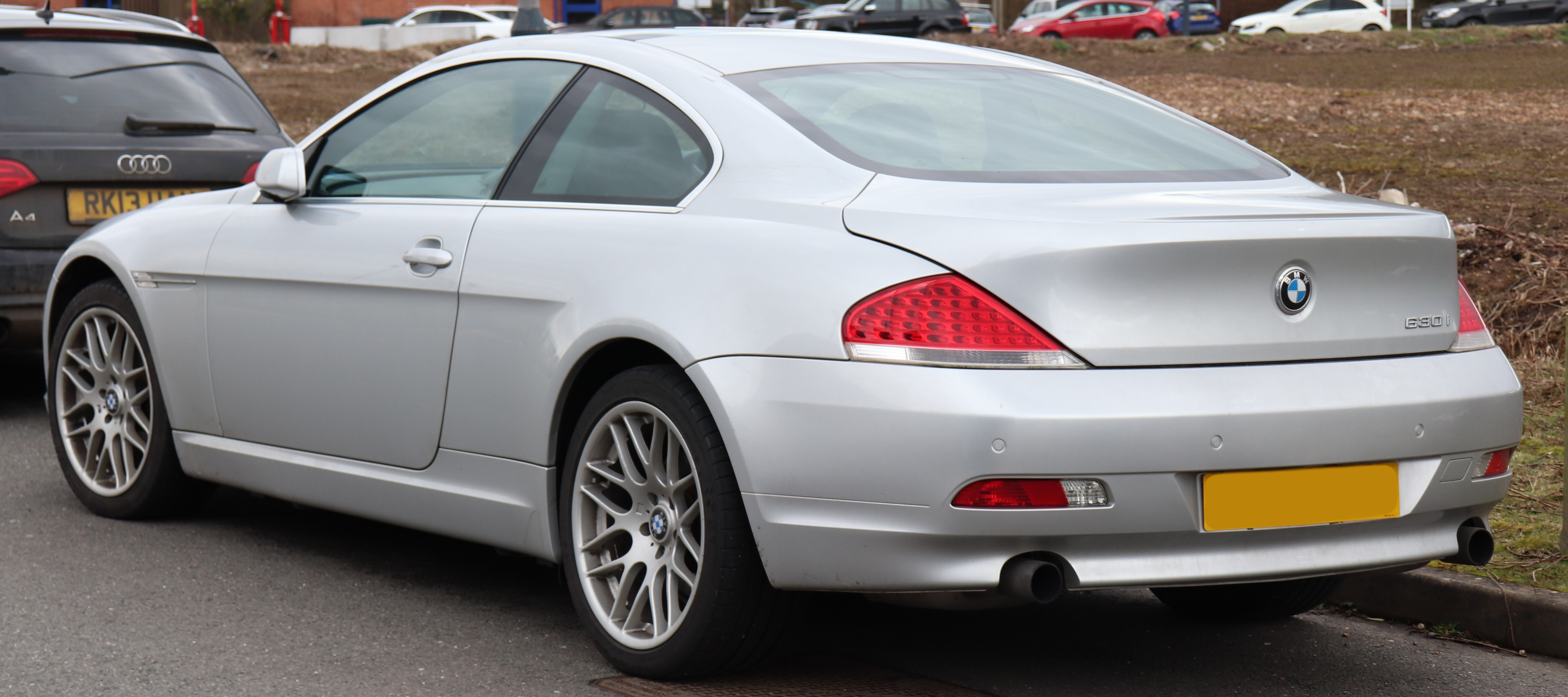
Pre-facelift rear

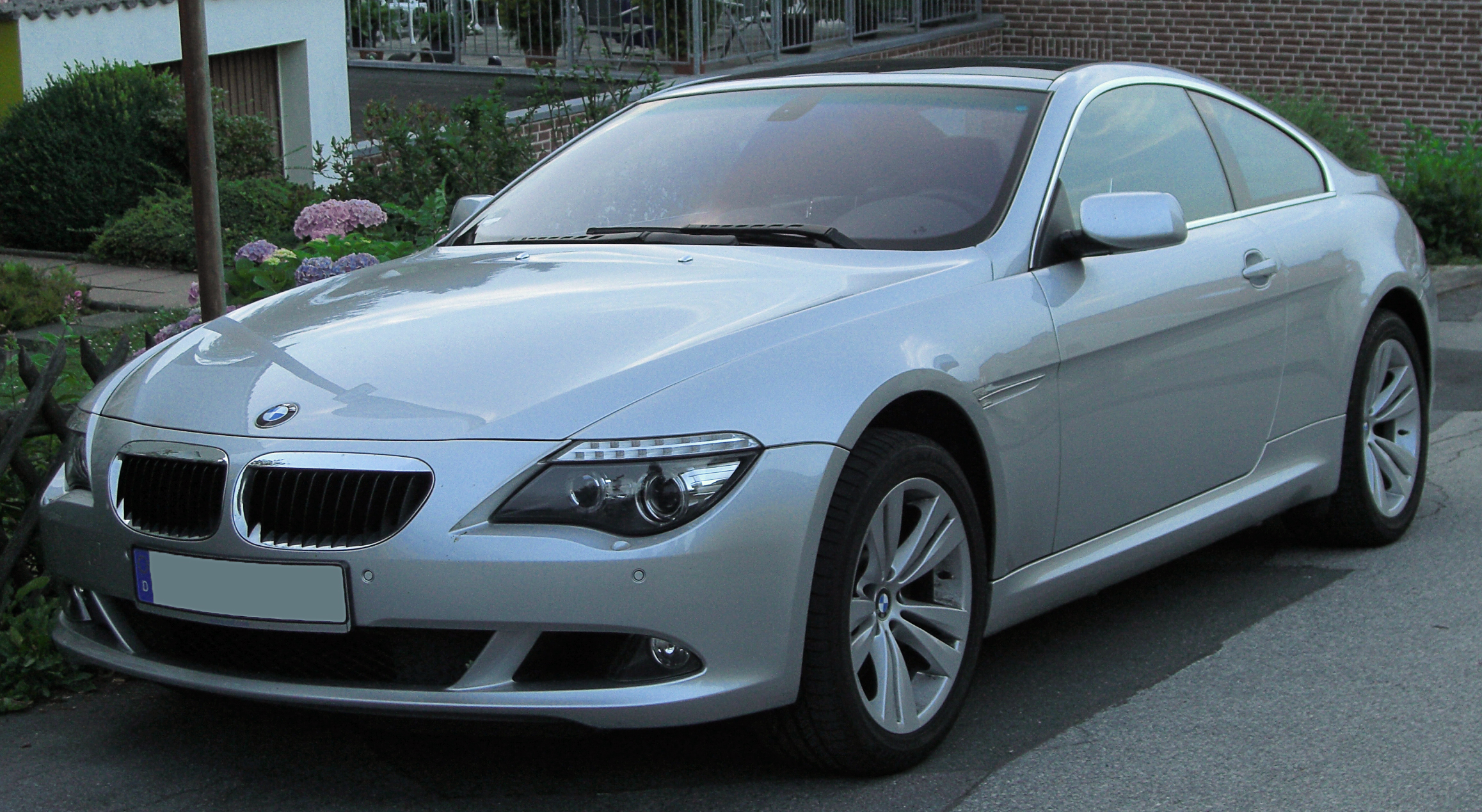
Post-facelift front

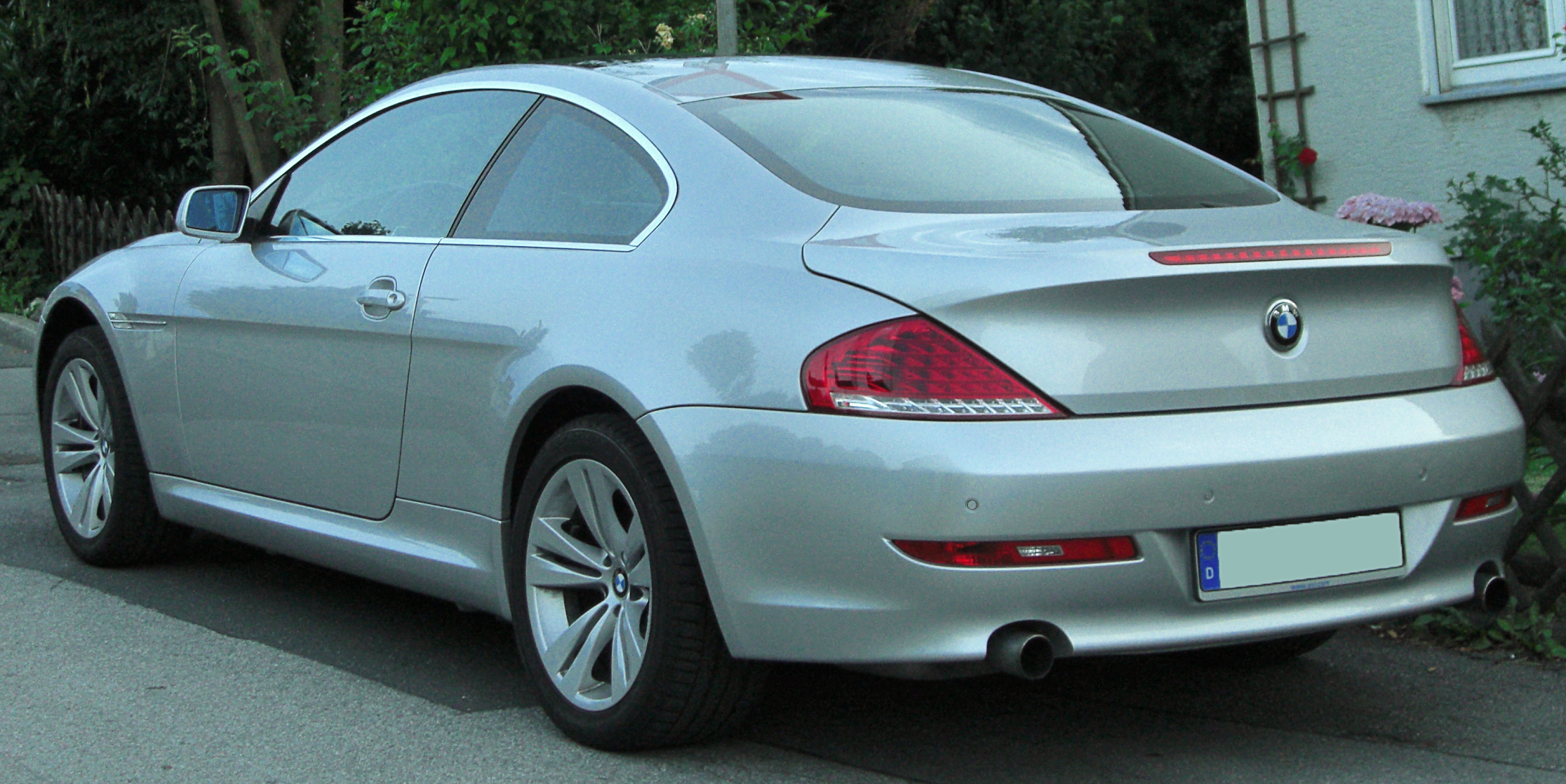
Post-facelift rear

=== 2009 ===
- iDrive upgraded to CIC version (previously CCC)

== Safety ==
Models feature BMW's Advanced Safety System, enabling the car to decide the most effective deployment of the airbags in a crash. Safety equipment includes active anti-roll bars, dynamic stability control, front knee airbags (in accordance with US regulation), BMW roadside assistance, and an SOS emergency system. Convertible models also feature an automatic rollover protection system, where roll-bars behind the rear seats are automatically deployed in a rollover. From 2008, active head restraints became a standard feature on all seat options, reducing the risk of neck injuries in a rear-end collision.

== Production volumes ==
The E63/E64 was produced at the Dingolfing BMW plant.

The following are production figures for the E63/E64, excluding M6 models:

Year	Total	Coupé	Convertible
2004	21,040	12,332	8,708
2005	23,340	12,447	10,893
2006	21,947	11,941	10,006
2007	19,626	9,967	9,659
2008	16,299	8,337	7,962
2009	8,648	4,501	4,147
2010	5,848	3,050	2,798
Total:	116,748	62,575	54,173
