= BMW X1 (E84) =

First generation of the BMW X1

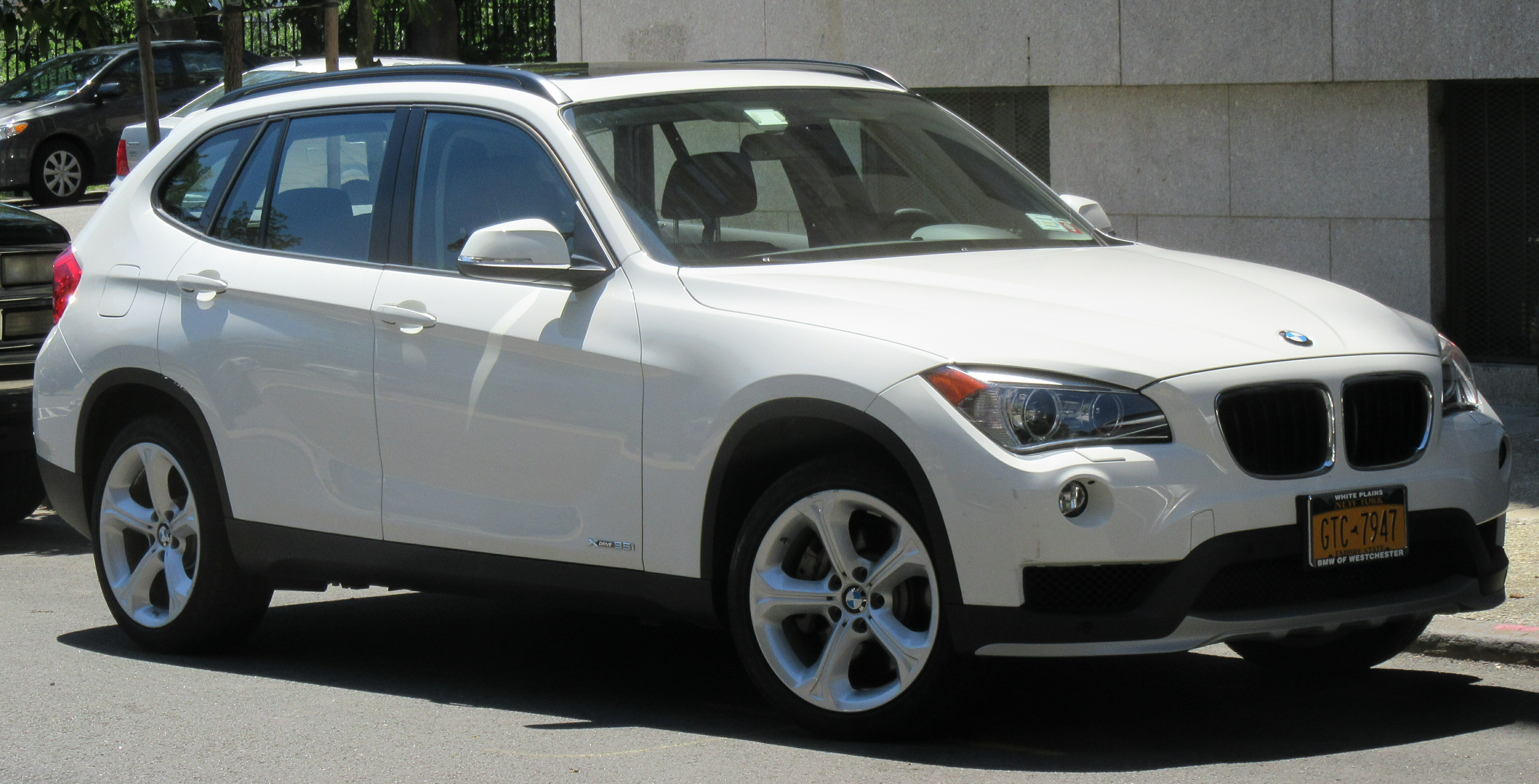
- BMW X1 (US; pre-facelift)

Overview
- Manufacturer: BMW
- Model code: E84
- Also called: Zinoro 1E (China; Electric Version)
- Production: October 2009 – June 2015
- Model years: 2010–2015
- Assembly: Germany: Leipzig; China: Shenyang (BBA); India: Chennai (BMW India); Indonesia: Jakarta (Gaya Motor); Thailand: Rayong (BMW Thailand); Malaysia: Kulim, Kedah (Inokom); Russia: Kaliningrad (Avtotor); Brazil: Araquari (BMW Group Brasil)
- Designer: Richard Kim

Body and chassis
- Class: Subcompact crossover SUV/C-segment
- Body style: 5-door SUV
- Layout: Front-engine, rear-wheel-drive; Front-engine, all-wheel-drive (xDrive)
- Platform: BMW L2
- Related: BMW 3 Series (E91); Zinoro 1E

Powertrain
- Engine: Petrol: 2.0 L N46 I4; 2.0 L N20 I4 turbo; 3.0 L N52 I6; 3.0 L N55 I6 turbo; Diesel: 2.0 L N47 I4 turbo/twin-turbo
- Transmission: 6-speed manual; 6-speed ZF 6HP automatic; 8-speed ZF 8HP automatic

Dimensions
- Wheelbase: 2,760 mm (108.7 in)
- Length: 4,454 mm (175.4 in)
- Width: 1,798 mm (70.8 in)
- Height: 1,545 mm (60.8 in)
- Kerb weight: 1,430–1,765 kg (3,153–3,891 lb)

Chronology
- Successor: BMW X1 (F48)

The E84 BMW X1 is a subcompact crossover SUV/C-segment model was produced from 2009 to 2015. It is the first generation model of the BMW X1 range, and was replaced by the F48 BMW X1 in mid-2015. When launched, it was the smallest SUV in the BMW lineup.

== Development and launch ==
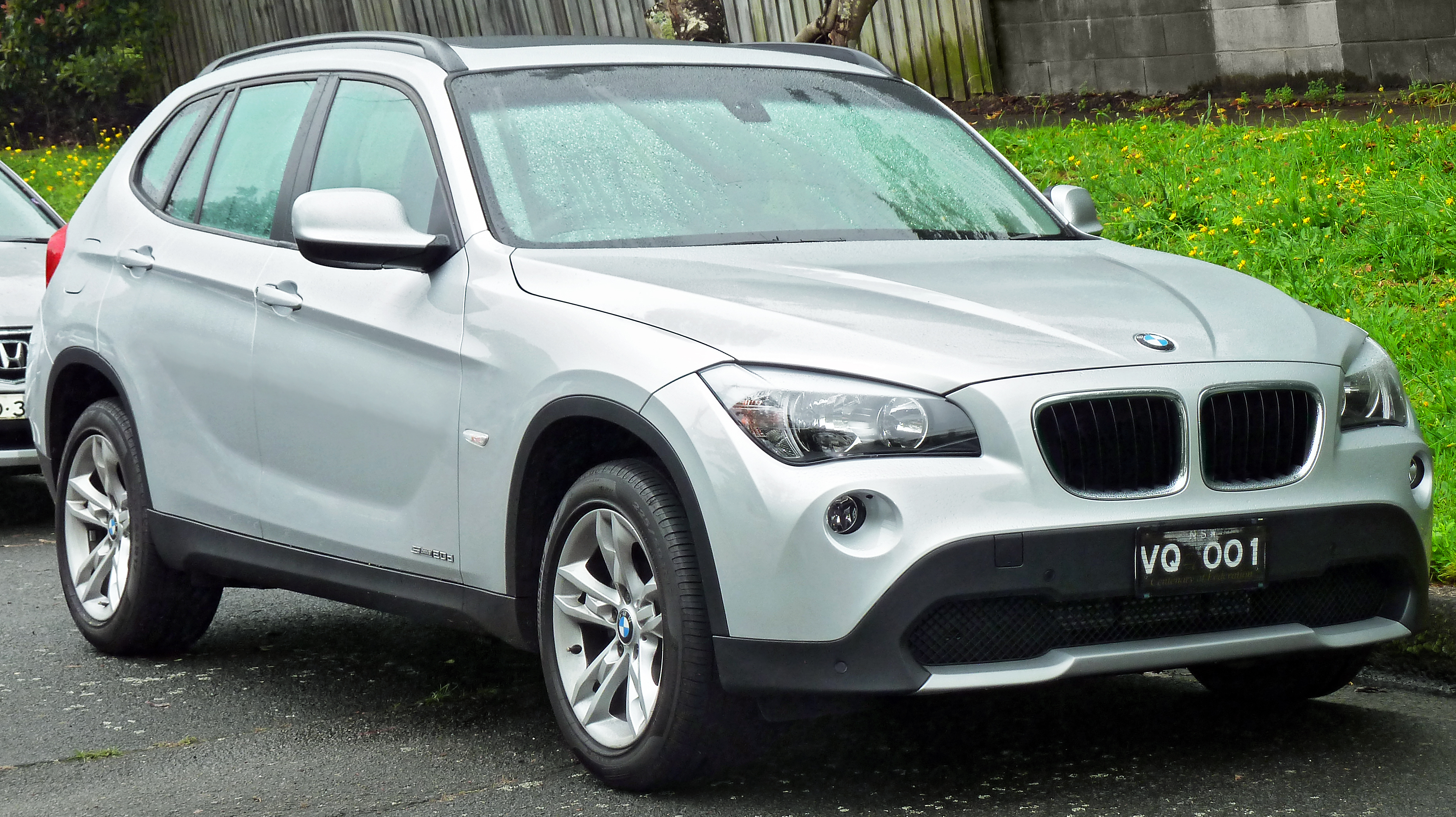

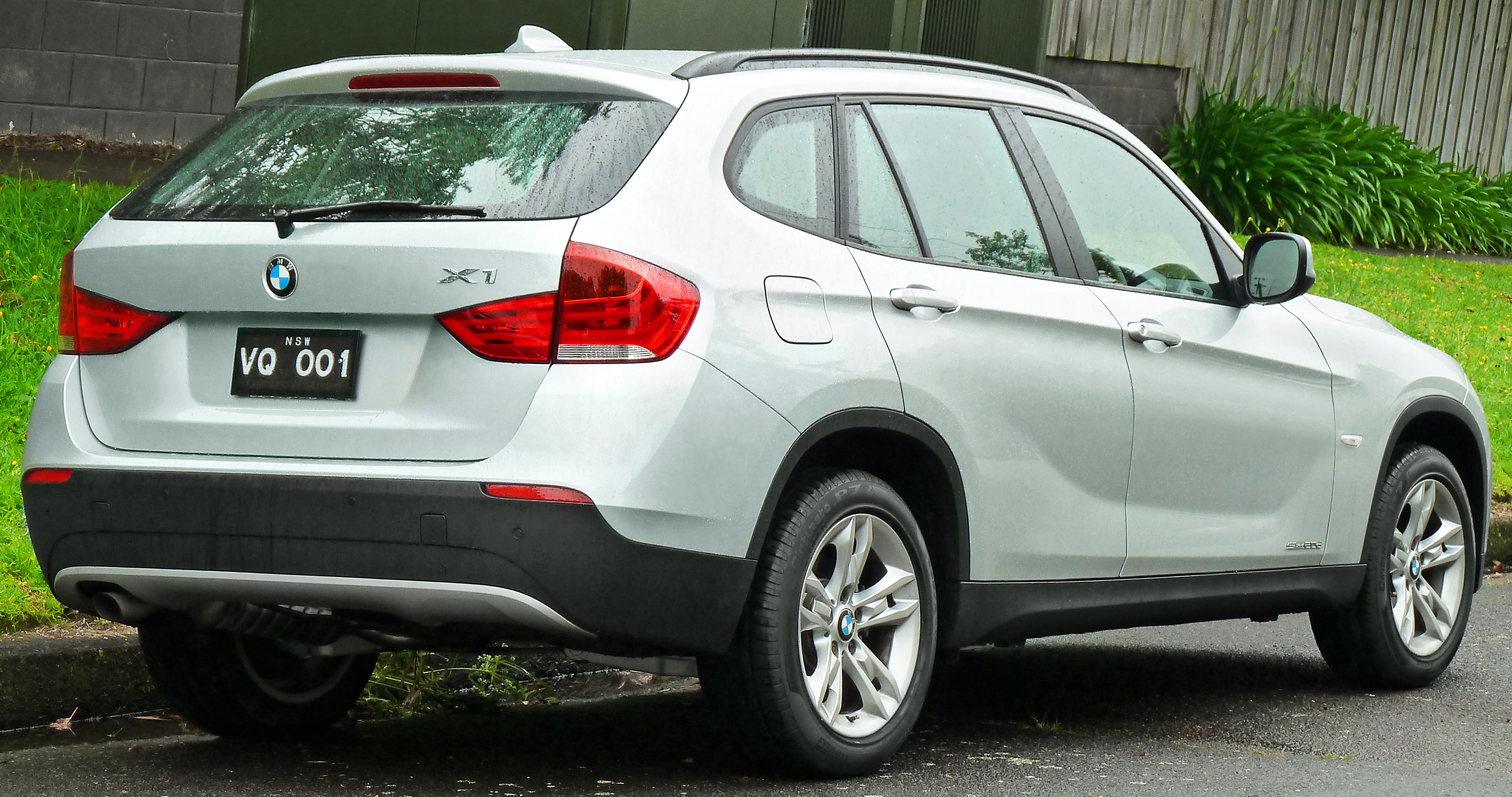
2010–2011 BMW X1 sDrive20d (Australia; pre-facelift)

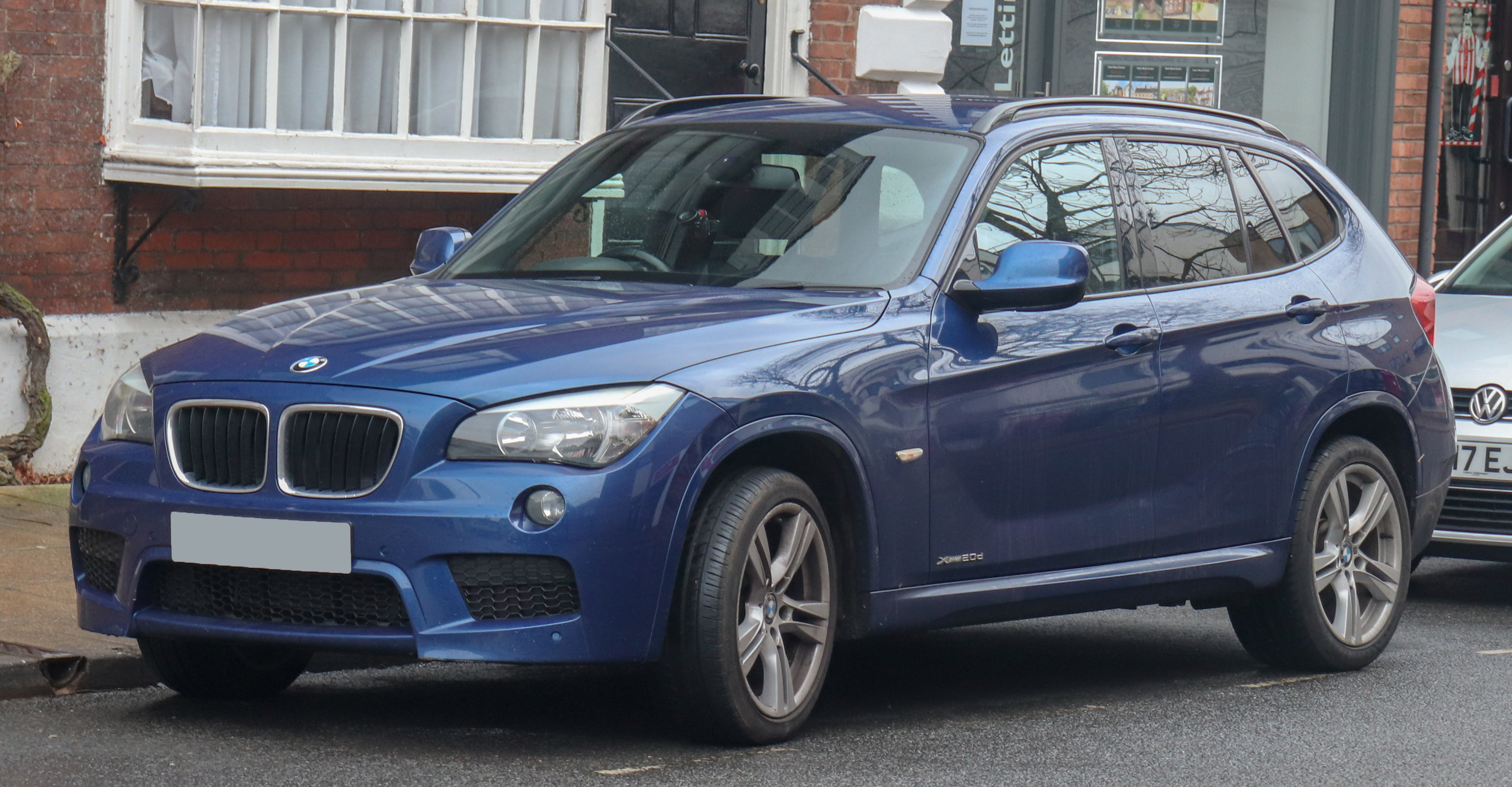

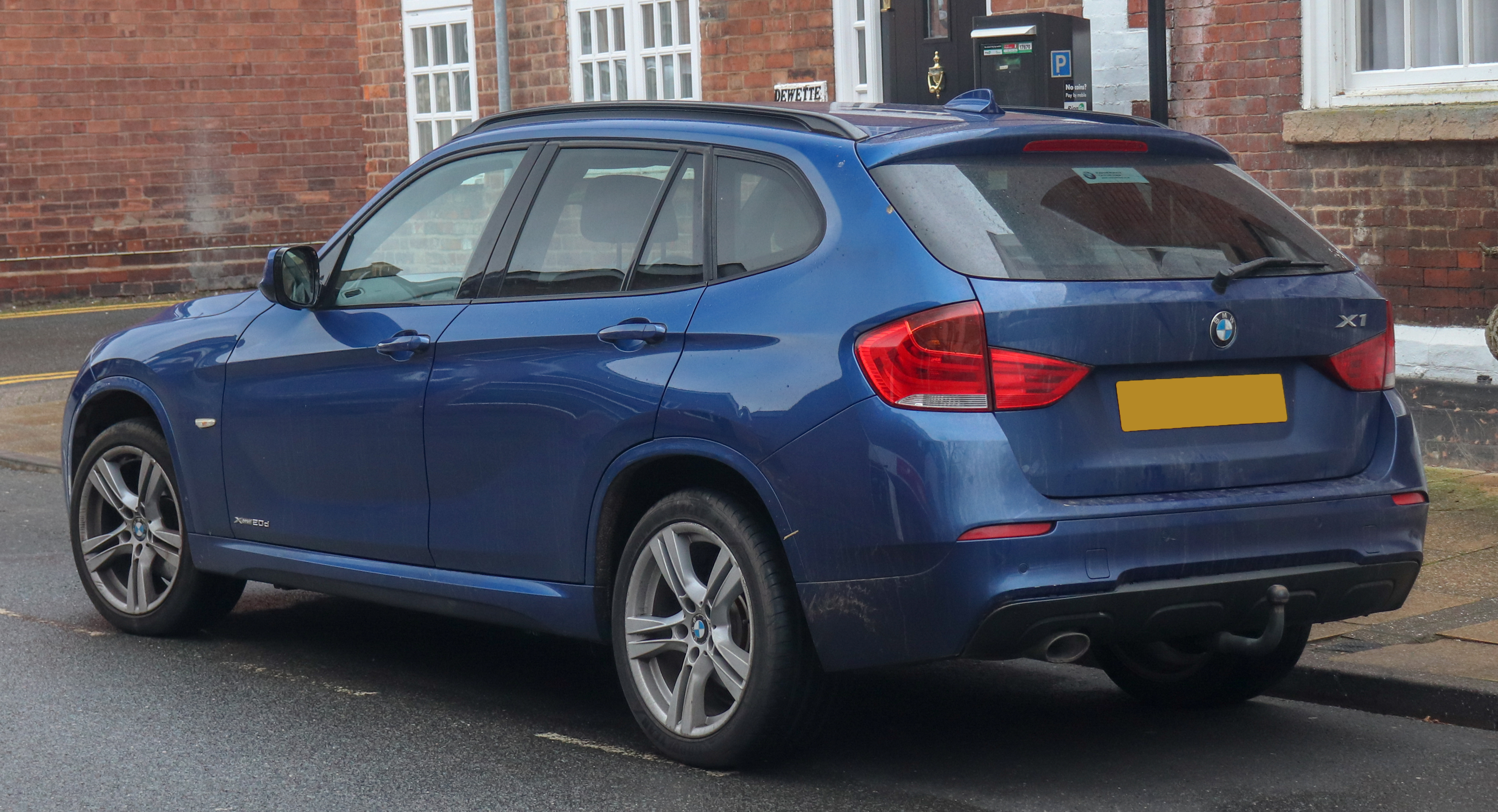
2011 BMW X1 xDrive20d M Sport (UK; pre-facelift)

Development of the vehicle started in 2006 as petrol prices were going up, BMW identified the need for a smaller and more efficient model in its SUV line-up. As the result, it was reported that BMW has shortened the development and pre-production time by 40 percent compared to previous X Series models.

The project director of the X1, Peter Kist commented that "never before has BMW produced a model that is meant for such a wide customer range." He pointed out it is suitable for young people and older people, and as X1 is the first BMW X Series to be available in the sDrive trim (two-wheel drive), it is suitable for customers who do not need off-road capability.

The E84 X1 was revealed in a near-production prototype called the Concept X1 that was revealed at the Paris Motor Show in October 2008.

The final production version of the X1 is based on the same platform used in the E90 3 Series, and both have the same 2,760 mm (108.7 in) wheelbase. The platform is also used in the Zinoro 1E, which is an all-electric crossover based on the X1, with a rear-mounted 125 kW (168 hp) electric motor that produces 250 N⋅m (184 lb⋅ft) of torque.

The X1 is available in rear-wheel drive (marketed as sDrive), and all-wheel drive (xDrive) variants with a 40/60 rear-bias.

== Equipment ==
The X1 offers 420 L (14.8 cu ft) of cargo volume. The rear seats can be folded in a 40:20:40 split and increases the storage space to 1,350 L (47.7 cu ft). Standard equipment includes dual-zone climate control, parking sensors, 17-inch alloy wheels, and regenerative braking. From 2012, the X1 is also offered in xLine, Sport, and M Sport trims.

xDrive25i and 35i models are only available with a 6-speed automatic transmission. The rest of the model range receives a 6-speed manual transmission and all models (except the sDrive20d EfficientDynamics) are optionally available with an automatic transmission. 18i and 23d models receive a 6-speed automatic, while 20i, 16d, and 25d models are available with an 8-speed automatic.

28i, 18d, and 20d models featured a 6-speed automatic until 2011, before being replaced by an 8-speed transmission.

== Models ==
=== Petrol engines ===
| Model | Years | Engine | Power | Torque | 0–100 km/h (0-62 mph) |
|---|---|---|---|---|---|
| sDrive18i | 2010–2015 | N46B20; 2.0 L I4 | 110 kW (148 hp) at 6,400 rpm | 200 N⋅m (148 lb⋅ft) at 3,600 rpm | 10.4 s |
| sDrive20i | 2011–2015 | N20B20; 2.0 L I4 turbo | 135 kW (181 hp) at 5,000–6,250 rpm | 270 N⋅m (199 lb⋅ft) at 1,250–4,500 rpm | 7.7 s |
| sDrive28i | 2011–2015 | N20B20; 2.0 L I4 turbo | 180 kW (241 hp) at 5,000–6,500 rpm | 350 N⋅m (258 lb⋅ft) at 1,250–4,800 rpm | 6.1 s |
| xDrive25i | 2010–2011 | N52B30; 3.0 L I6 | 160 kW (215 hp) at 6,100 rpm | 280 N⋅m (207 lb⋅ft) at 2,500–3,500 rpm | 7.9 s |
| xDrive28i | 2009–2010 | N52B30; 3.0 L I6 | 190 kW (255 hp) at 6,600 rpm | 310 N⋅m (229 lb⋅ft) at 2,600–3,000 rpm | 6.8 s |
| xDrive28i | 2011–2015 | N20B20; 2.0 L I4 turbo | 180 kW (241 hp) at 5,000–6,500 rpm | 350 N⋅m (258 lb⋅ft) at 1,250–4,800 rpm | 6.4 s |
| xDrive35i | 2013–2015 | N55B30; 3.0 L I6 turbo | 224 kW (300 hp) at 5,800 rpm | 407 N⋅m (300 lb⋅ft) at 1,300–5,000 rpm | 5.6 s |

=== Diesel engines ===
| Model | Years | Engine | Power | Torque | 0–100 km/h (0-62 mph) |
|---|---|---|---|---|---|
| sDrive16d | 2012–2015 | N47D20; 2.0 L I4 turbo | 85 kW (114 hp) at 4,000 rpm | 260 N⋅m (192 lb⋅ft) at 1,750–3,000 rpm | 11.3 s |
| sDrive18d | 2009–2015 | N47D20; 2.0 L I4 turbo | 105 kW (141 hp) at 4,000 rpm | 320 N⋅m (236 lb⋅ft) at 1,750–2,000 rpm | 9.9 s |
| sDrive20d | 2009–2012 | N47D20; 2.0 L I4 turbo | 130 kW (174 hp) at 4,000 rpm | 350 N⋅m (258 lb⋅ft) at 1,750–3,000 rpm | 8.0 s |
| sDrive20d | 2013–2015 | N47D20; 2.0 L I4 turbo | 135 kW (181 hp) at 4,000 rpm | 380 N⋅m (280 lb⋅ft) at 1,750–2,750 rpm | 7.4 s |
| sDrive20d; EfficientDynamics | 2011–2015 | N47D20; 2.0 L I4 turbo | 120 kW (161 hp) at 4,000 rpm | 380 N⋅m (280 lb⋅ft) at 1,750–2,750 rpm | 8.3 s |
| xDrive20d | 2009–2015 | N47D20; 2.0 L I4 twin-turbo | 140 kW (188 hp) at 4,000 rpm | 400 N⋅m (295 lb⋅ft) at 1,750–2,500 rpm | 7.6 s |
| xDrive23d | 2009–2012 | N47D20; 2.0 L I4 twin-turbo | 150 kW (201 hp) at 4,400 rpm | 400 N⋅m (295 lb⋅ft) at 2,000–2,250 rpm | 7.3 s |
| xDrive25d | 2012–2015 | N47D20; 2.0 L I4 twin-turbo | 160 kW (215 hp) at 4,000 rpm | 450 N⋅m (332 lb⋅ft) at 1,500–2,500 rpm | 6.8 s |

== Special models ==
=== Powder Ride Edition ===
The X1 Powder Ride edition was released in November 2012 as an option for xDrive28i and 35i models. It is based on the Concept K2 Powder Ride unveiled earlier at the 2012 Los Angeles International Auto Show and was done in collaboration with K2 Sports. Models feature xLine specific equipment (including exclusive paint colours, restyled exterior elements, 18-inch alloy wheels, and a multifunction sports leather steering wheel), as well as a roof rack and roof box, and Powder Ride Edition decals on the doors and wheel arches. In winter 2013, an X1 Edition Powder Ride was introduced for xDrive20i, 28i, 18d, 20d, and 25d models with similar features.

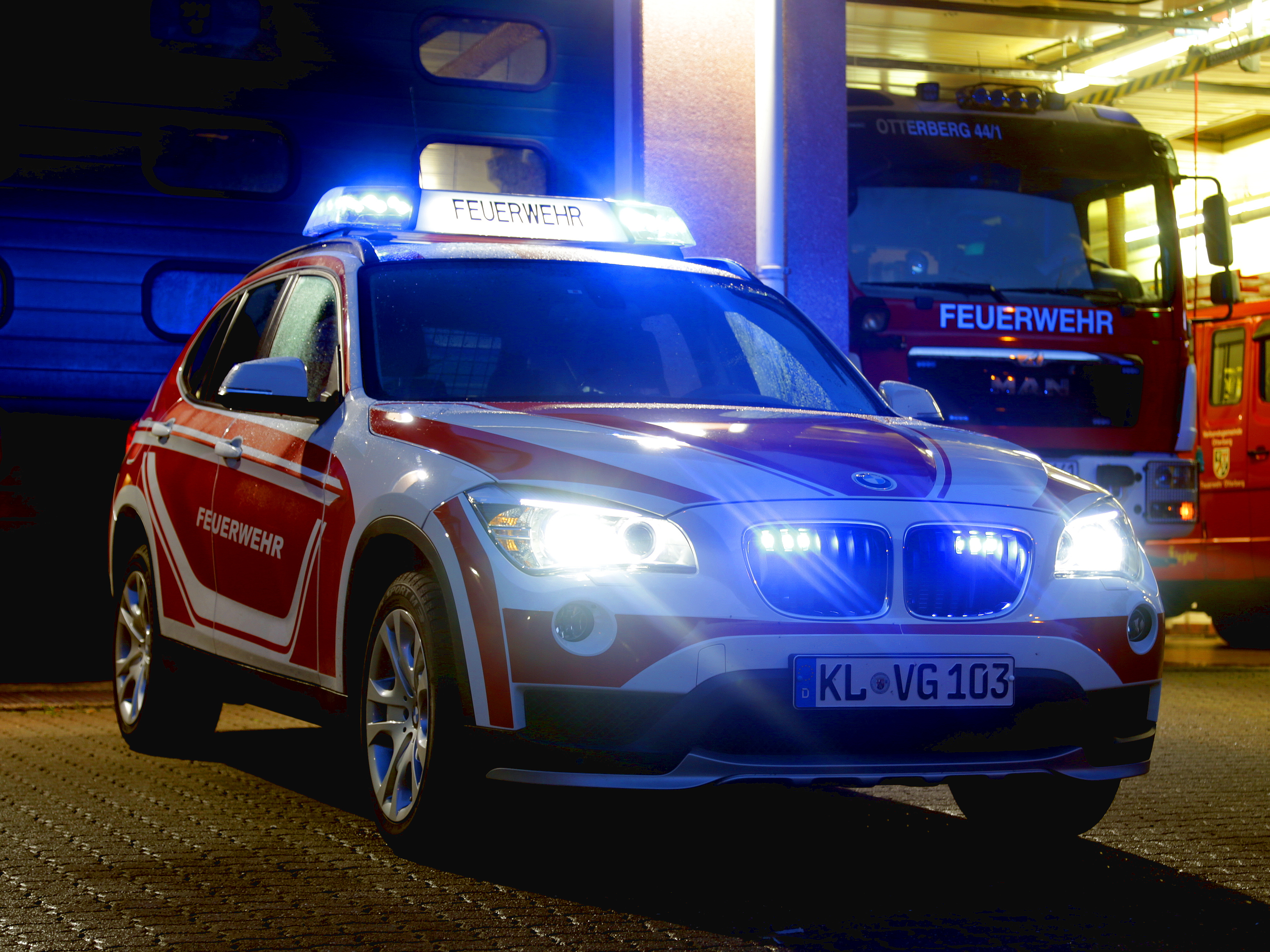
BMW X1 fire command vehicle

=== Emergency vehicles ===
A version of the X1 sDrive16d specifically made for use in the emergency services was unveiled at RETTmobil 2013, an annual convention held to showcase rescue and emergency vehicles. The car, named BMW X1 First Responder, features custom livery, a head-up display, speed-limit information, night-vision, and a navigation system with real-time traffic information. An X1 xDrive20d fire command vehicle was also showcased a year later at RETTmobil 2014.

== Model year changes ==
=== 2011 ===
The following changes took effect from autumn 2011:

- X1 sDrive20d EfficientDynamics model introduced
- xDrive28i engine updated to N20B20 (2.0-litre 4-cylinder turbo) and now features a manual transmission
- Diesel models receive increased noise insulation
- 20i, 28i, and 20d models now feature brake stand-by function and hill-start assistant features

=== 2012 facelift ===
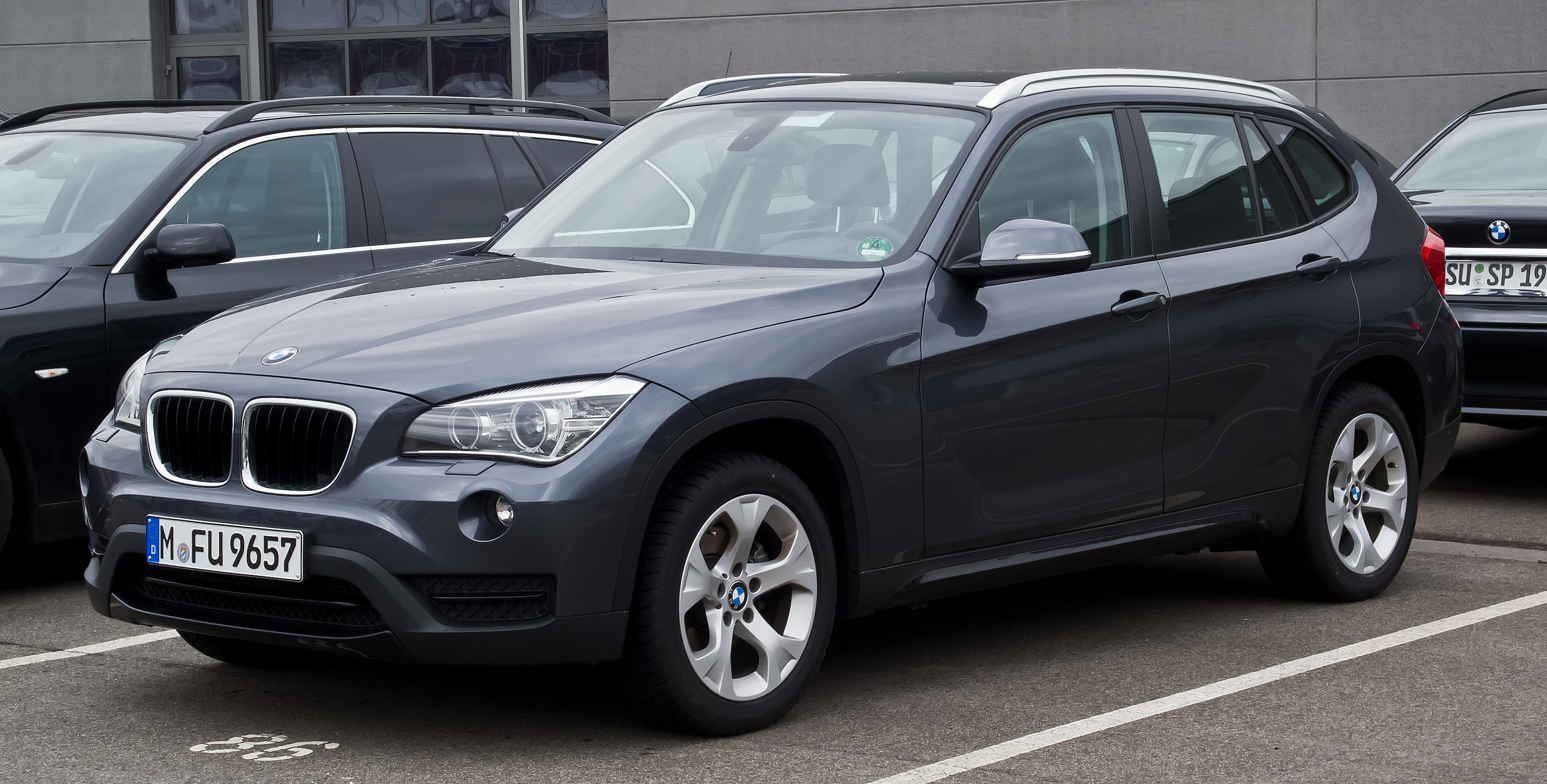

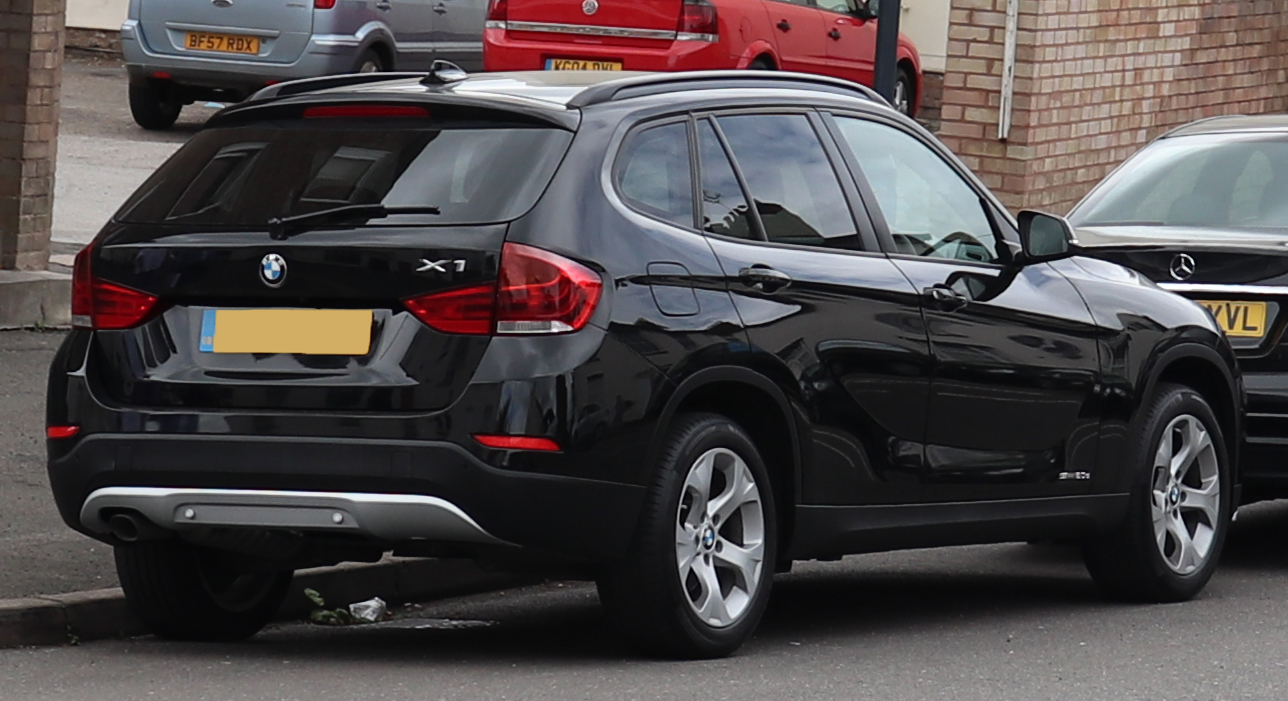
BMW X1 (facelift)

The following changes were shown at the 2012 New York International Auto Show:

- Exterior design changes including: redesigned headlights, taillights, front bumpers, and redesigned mirrors with integrated indicators
- Interior changes including: an updated centre console design, new interior trim choices, and a new steering wheel design
- Introduction of xLine, Sport, and M Sport trims
- Addition of BMW EfficientDynamics program on all models (including features such as electric power steering and an engine start-stop system)
- Introduction of the first X1 models for the United States market

=== 2014 ===
The updated X1 was unveiled at the 2014 North American International Auto Show and went on sale in spring of 2014:

- Updated BMW ConnectedDrive services
- Addition of new interior trim options, new Sparkling Brown metallic exterior paint colour, and new 17-inch alloy wheel design

== Safety ==
ANCAP test results* BMW X1 variant(s) as tested (2010)
| Test | Score |
|---|---|
| Overall | 5 /5 stars |
| Frontal offset | 14.02/16 |
| Side impact | 16/16 |
| Pole | 2/2 |
| Seat belt reminders | 2/3 |
| Whiplash protection | Not Assessed |
| Pedestrian protection | Adequate |
| Electronic stability control | Standard |

The 2012 X1 scored five stars overall in the Euro NCAP test.

Euro NCAP test results* BMW X1, LHD (2012)
| Test | Points | % |
|---|---|---|
| Overall: | 5 /5 stars | |
| Adult occupant: | 31 | 87% |
| Child occupant: | 42 | 86% |
| Pedestrian: | 23 | 64% |
| Safety assist: | 5 | 71% |

== Production volumes ==
The following are production figures for the E84 X1:

| Year | Total |
|---|---|
| 2009 | 8,499 |
| 2010 | 99,990 |
| 2011 | 126,429 |
| 2012 | 147,776 |
| 2013 | 161,353 |
| 2014 | 156,471 |
| 2015 | 120,011 |
| Total: | 820,529 |

== Awards ==
- 2009 Auto Zeitung “Auto Trophy”
- 2010 Auto Zeitung "Design Trophy"
- 2010 Red Dot award for outstanding product design
- 2010 Auto Bild Design Award in the “SUV, Van and All-Wheel-Drive” category
