= BMW N20 =

BMW N20 engine
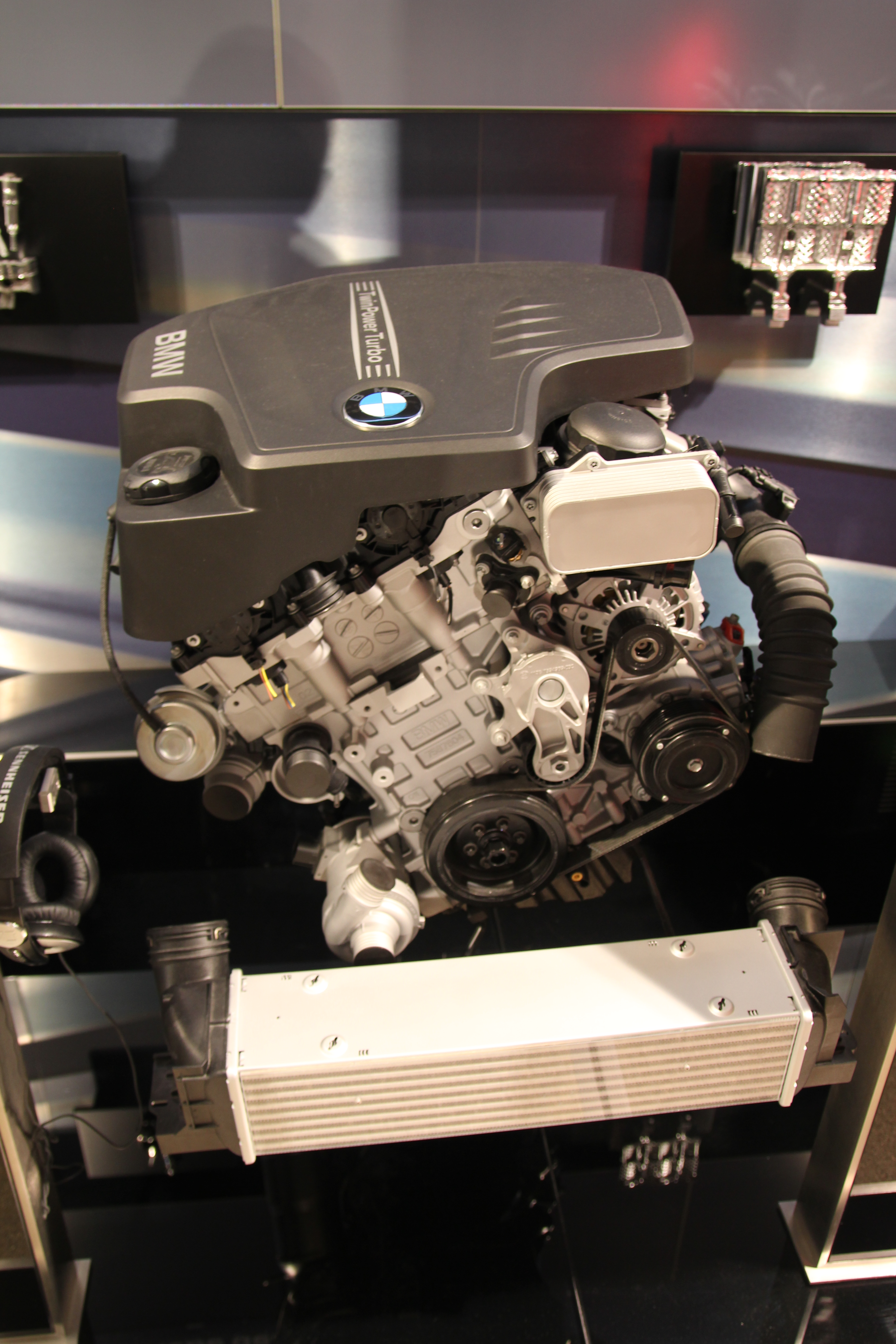

Overview
- Manufacturer: BMW
- Production: 2011-2018

Layout
- Configuration: Inline-4
- Displacement: 1,592 cc (97 cu in); 1,997 cc (122 cu in)
- Cylinder bore: 84.0 mm (3.31 in)
- Piston stroke: 71.8 mm (2.83 in); 90.1 mm (3.55 in)
- Cylinder block material: Aluminium
- Cylinder head material: Aluminium
- Valvetrain: DOHC, with VVT & VVL

Combustion
- Turbocharger: Single twin-scroll
- Fuel type: Gasoline

Chronology
- Predecessor: BMW N52, BMW N53
- Successor: BMW B48

The BMW N20 is a 1.6 and 2.0 L (98 and 122 cu in) turbocharged four-cylinder DOHC petrol engine with variable valve lift and variable valve timing which replaced the N53 (or BMW N52 in some markets) and was produced from 2011 to 2017 by BMW. Although the N20 is a four-cylinder engine, it is considered a replacement for the naturally aspirated six-cylinder N52/N53 because it powers equivalent models, producing similar horsepower to the N52/N53 with greater low-rpm torque and better efficiency.

The N20 features a twin-scroll turbocharger, double-VANOS (variable valve timing), Valvetronic (variable valve lift), direct injection, automatic stop-start and an electric water pump. The N20 was sold alongside the smaller displacement BMW N13 turbocharged four-cylinder engine. The N20 was placed in Wards Top 10 Engines in 2012.

In 2014, the N20 began to be replaced by its successor, the BMW B48.

== Class action lawsuit alleging timing chain guide failures ==
It has been well documented in online forums, that thousands of early production N20 engines were manufactured with faulty internal plastic timing chain guides. Evidence indicates that defective polycarbonate compositions were utilized in the manufacturing process for the timing chain guide, and as a result over a very short period of time the rigid plastic guides would break down and deteriorate in the engine with little or no warning. Upon failure of these internal plastic components, the timing chain slackens (becomes loose) and "skips time" by jumping teeth on upper cam shaft sprocket, a phenomenon that causes catastrophic damage to the engine by changing the piston-to-valve synchronization and causing these parts to contact each other.

In 2017, a class action lawsuit was filed by several owners against BMW seeking redress for the faulty units. Plaintiffs in the BMW engine defect class action seek to represent a nationwide Class of consumers affected by timing chain guide and secondary chain failure and wear as well as several subclasses for states such as New Jersey, Illinois, Florida, Utah, New York, Colorado, Texas, Alabama, Oklahoma, Massachusetts, California, Wisconsin, Oregon and North Carolina. In 2018 BMW attempted to dismiss the class action lawsuit. In 2019 U.S. District Judge William H. Walls partially granted and partially denied BMW's motion to dismiss claims that it sold vehicles with a known engine defect. Walls also ruled that the automaker cannot escape the suit entirely.

== Models ==
Engine	Displacement	Power	Torque	Redline	Year
N20B16	1,592 cc (97.1 cu in)	125 kW (168 bhp) at 5,000 rpm	250 N⋅m (184 lb⋅ft) at 1,500-4,700 rpm	7,000	2013–2016
N20B20	1,997 cc (121.9 cu in)	115 kW (154 bhp) at 5,000 rpm	240 N⋅m (177 lb⋅ft) at 1,250-4,500 rpm	7,000	2013–2017
N20B20	1,997 cc (121.9 cu in)	135 kW (181 bhp) at 5,000 rpm	270 N⋅m (199 lb⋅ft) at 1,250-4,500 rpm	7,000	2011–2017
N20B20	1,997 cc (121.9 cu in)	160 kW (215 bhp) at 5,500 rpm	310 N⋅m (229 lb⋅ft) at 1,350-4,800 rpm	7,000	2012–2017
N20B20	1,997 cc (121.9 cu in)	180 kW (241 bhp) at 5,000 rpm	350 N⋅m (258 lb⋅ft) at 1,250-4,800 rpm	7,000	2011–2017

=== N20B16 ===
Applications:

125 kW version

- 2013–2016 F10 520i (Turkey and Tunisia only)

=== N20B20 ===
Applications:

115 kW version

- 2013–2016 E89 Z4 sDrive18i
- 2013–2017 F25 X3 sDrive18i

135 kW version

- 2011–2015 E84 X1 xDrive/sDrive20i
- 2011–2017 F25 X3 xDrive20i
- 2012–2015 F30 320i
- 2013–2016 F34 320i GT
- 2014–2016 F32 420i
- 2011–2016 F10 520i
- 2013-2016 F10 520Li
- 2011–2016 E89 Z4 sDrive20i
- 2014–2016 F22 220i
- 2015–2017 Brilliance Huasong 7 MPV

160 kW version

- 2012–2017 F20 125i
- 2013–2016 F10 525Li
- 2015–2017 Brilliance Huasong 7 MPV

180 kW version

- 2011–2016 E89 Z4 sDrive28i
- 2011–2015 E84 X1 xDrive/sDrive28i
- 2012–2017 F25 X3 xDrive28i
- 2011–2016 F30 328i
- 2014–2016 F32 428i
- 2012–2016 F10 528i
- 2013–2016 F34 328i GT
- 2014–2016 F22 228i
- 2014–2017 F26 X4 xDrive28i
- 2016–2018 F15 X5 xDrive40e

== See also ==
- BMW
- List of BMW engines
