= BMW N53 =

BMW N53 engine
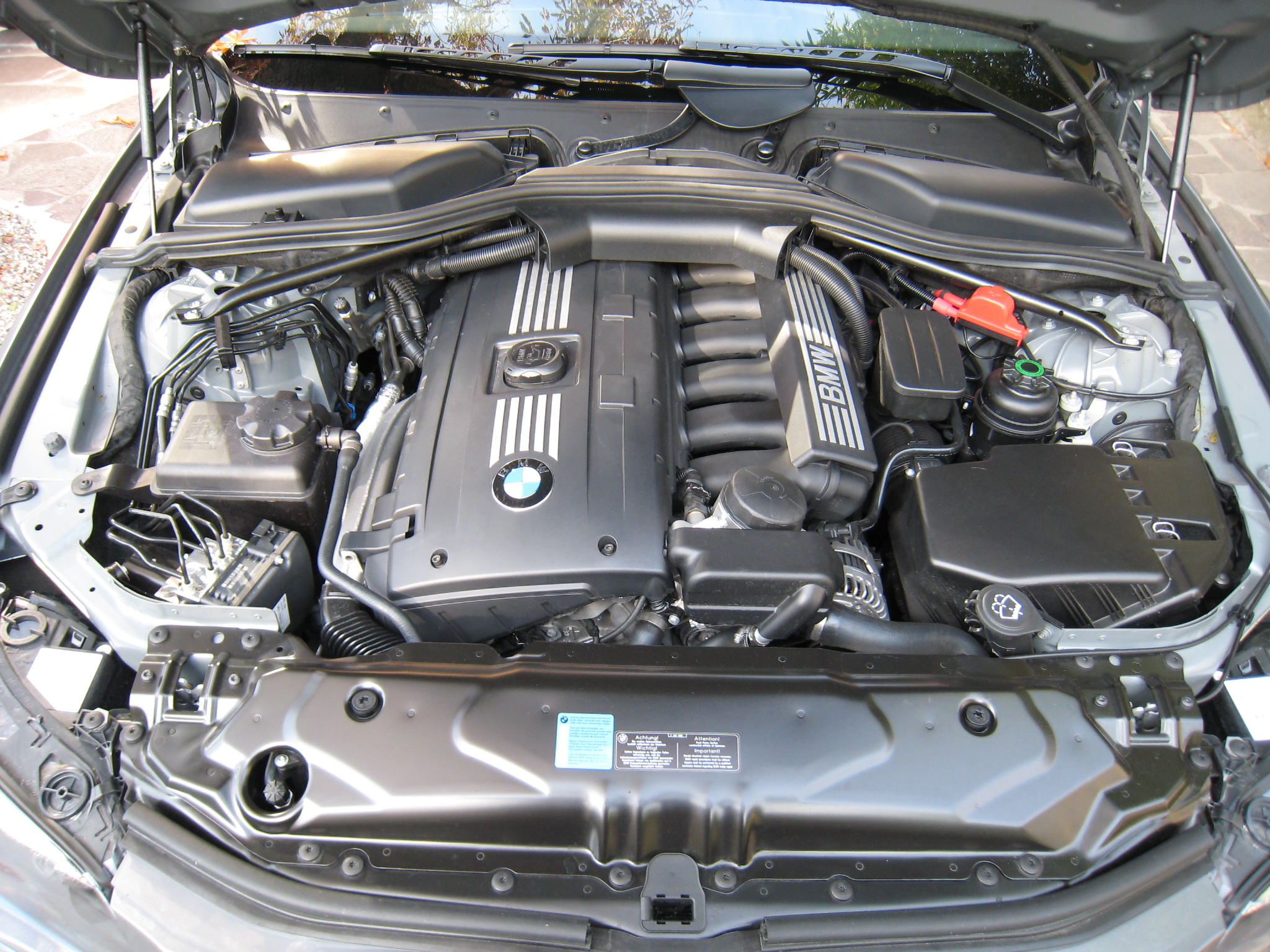

Overview
- Production: 2006–2013

Layout
- Configuration: Straight-6
- Displacement: 2,497 cc (152 cu in); 2,996 cc (183 cu in)
- Cylinder bore: 82 mm (3.2 in); 85 mm (3.3 in)
- Piston stroke: 78.8 mm (3.10 in); 88 mm (3.5 in)
- Cylinder block material: Magnesium-Aluminium
- Cylinder head material: Aluminium
- Valvetrain: DOHC, with VVT

Combustion
- Fuel type: Petrol

Chronology
- Predecessor: BMW N52
- Successor: BMW N54

The BMW N53 is a naturally aspirated straight-6 petrol engine which was produced from 2006 to 2013. The N53 replaced the BMW N52 in certain markets and debuted on the post-facelift E60 5 Series.

In European markets, the N53 began replacing its port-injected parent, the BMW N52, in 2007. Markets such as the United States, Canada, Australia, and Malaysia retained the N52, as the N53 was deemed unsuitable due to the high sulfur content of local fuel.

The N52 and N53 are the last naturally aspirated straight-six engines produced by BMW, ending a history of continuous production of this engine configuration since the BMW M30 in 1968. In 2011, the N52 began to be replaced by the BMW N20 turbocharged four-cylinder engine. N53 production ceased in 2013.

There is no BMW M version of the N53. The BMW N54 turbocharged straight-6 engine was produced alongside the N53.

== Design ==
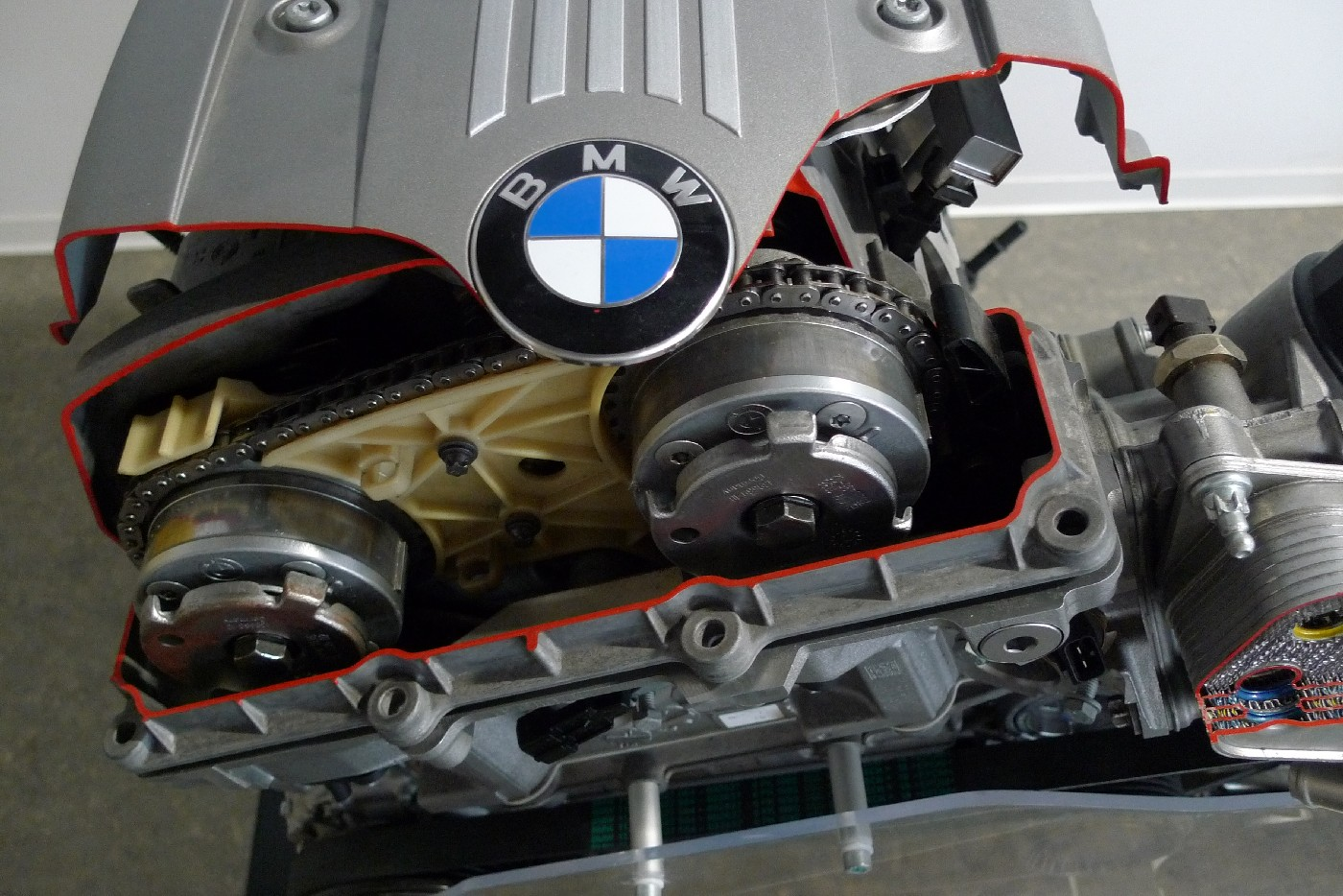
Double-VANOS, as seen on an N52 engine

Compared with its N52 predecessor which was port-injected, the N53 uses direct injection. The direct injection system uses piezoelectric fuel injectors which inject into the combustion chamber, using a stratified lean mixture operation. The compression ratio was increased to 12.0:1 for the N53.

As per the N52, the N53 has double-VANOS (variable valve timing) and a magnesium alloy block. Unlike the N52, the N53 does not have Valvetronic (variable valve lift), due to space limitations in the cylinder head.

The bore of 85 mm (3.35 in) and stroke of 88 mm (3.46 in) are the same as the N52. Each cylinder has coil-on-plug ignition, as per the N52.

== Versions ==
Engine Code	Displacement	Power	Torque	Years
N53B25	2,497 cc (152.4 cu in)	140 kW (188 bhp) at 6,100 rpm	235 N⋅m (173 lb⋅ft) at 3,500-5,000 rpm	2006-2010
N53B30	2,996 cc (182.8 cu in)	150 kW (201 bhp) at 6,100 rpm	270 N⋅m (199 lb⋅ft) at 1,500-4,250 rpm	2009-2011
N53B30	2,996 cc (182.8 cu in)	160 kW (215 bhp) at 6,100 rpm	270 N⋅m (199 lb⋅ft) at 2,400-4,200 rpm	2007-2013
N53B30	2,996 cc (182.8 cu in)	190 kW (255 bhp) at 6,600 rpm	310 N⋅m (229 lb⋅ft) at 2,600-5,000 rpm	2009-2011
N53B30	2,996 cc (182.8 cu in)	200 kW (268 bhp) at 6,700 rpm	320 N⋅m (236 lb⋅ft) at 2,750-3,000 rpm	2007-2013

=== N53B25 ===
The 2.5 L (153 cu in) version of the N53 produces 140 kW (188 bhp) and 235 N⋅m (173 lb⋅ft). It has a bore of 82 mm (3.23 in) and a stroke of 78.8 mm (3.10 in).

Applications:

- 2006-2010 E60/E61 523i

=== N53B30 (150 kW) ===
A 150 kW (201 bhp) version of the N53 was used in the pre-facelift F10 523i.

Applications:

- 2009-2011 F10/F11 523i

=== N53B30 (160 kW) ===
This 3.0 L (183 cu in) version of the N53 produces 160 kW (215 bhp), the same figure as the 2.5 L (153 cu in) version of its N52 predecessor. However, peak torque increased from 250 to 270 N⋅m (184 to 199 lb⋅ft).

Applications:

- 2007-2013 E90/E91/E92/E93 325i
- 2006-2010 E60/E61 525i

=== N53B30 (190 kW) ===
A 190 kW (255 bhp) version of the N53 was used in the pre-facelift F10 528i.

Applications:

- 2009-2011 F10/F11 528i

=== N53B30 (200 kW) ===
The most powerful version of the N53 produces 200 kW (268 bhp) of power and 320 N⋅m (236 lb⋅ft) of torque.

Applications:

- 2007-2010 E60/E61 530i
- 2007-2010 E63 630i
- 2007-2013 E90/E91/E92/E93 330i
- 2011-2013 F10 530i

=== High-Pressure Fuel Pump failures ===
The N53 uses the same High-Pressure Fuel Pump (HPFP) as the BMW N54 turbocharged straight-six engine, which had HPFP failures leading to Lemon Law "buy backs" and legal action in the United States. The N53 engine was not sold in the United States, therefore the N53 engine was not involved with these actions.

Failures of the N53 HPFP have been reported, although it is not known whether failure in the N53 is as common as the N54.

== See also ==
- BMW
- List of BMW engines
