= BMW N52 =

Straight-6 DOHC piston engine

BMW N52 engine
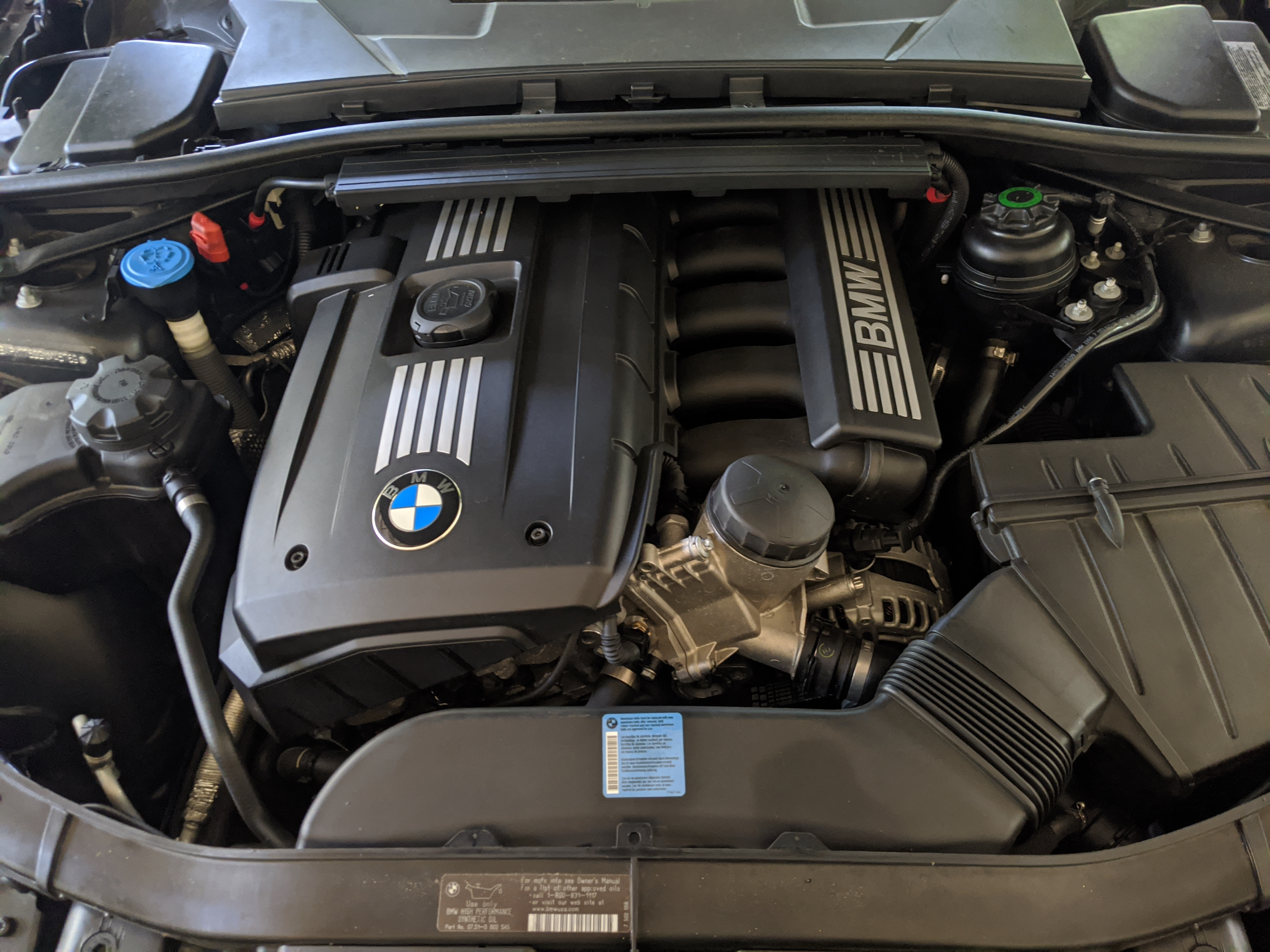

Overview
- Production: 2004–2015

Layout
- Configuration: Straight-6
- Displacement: 2,497 cc (152 cu in); 2,996 cc (183 cu in)
- Cylinder bore: 82 mm (3.2 in); 85 mm (3.3 in)
- Piston stroke: 78.8 mm (3.10 in); 88 mm (3.5 in)
- Cylinder block material: Magnesium-Aluminium
- Cylinder head material: Aluminium
- Valvetrain: DOHC, with VVT & VVL

RPM range
- Max. engine speed: 7,000 rpm

Combustion
- Fuel type: Petrol

Chronology
- Predecessor: BMW M54
- Successor: BMW N53

The BMW N52 is a naturally aspirated straight-6 petrol engine which was produced from 2004 to 2015. The N52 replaced the BMW M54 and debuted on the E9x 3 Series and E6x 5 and 7 Series.

The N52 was the first water-cooled engine to use magnesium/aluminium composite construction in the engine block. It was also listed as one of Ward's 10 Best Engines in 2006 and 2007.

In European markets, the N52 began to be phased out in favor of its direct injected version, the BMW N53 in 2007. Markets such as the United States, Canada, Australia and Malaysia retained the N52 as the N53 was deemed unsuitable due to the high sulphur content of local fuel.

The engine is equipped with a dual overhead cam 24 valve cylinder head and the crankshaft is held in place with 36 main bearing cap bolts. The static compression ratio is 10.7:1 advertised, requiring the use of 100 RON (94 AKI) fuel.

The N52 and N53 are the last naturally aspirated straight-six engines produced by BMW, ending a history of continuous production of this engine configuration since the BMW M30 in 1968. In 2011, the N52 began to be replaced by the BMW N20 turbocharged four-cylinder engine. N52 production ceased in 2015.

Unlike its predecessors, there is no BMW M version of the N52.

== Design ==
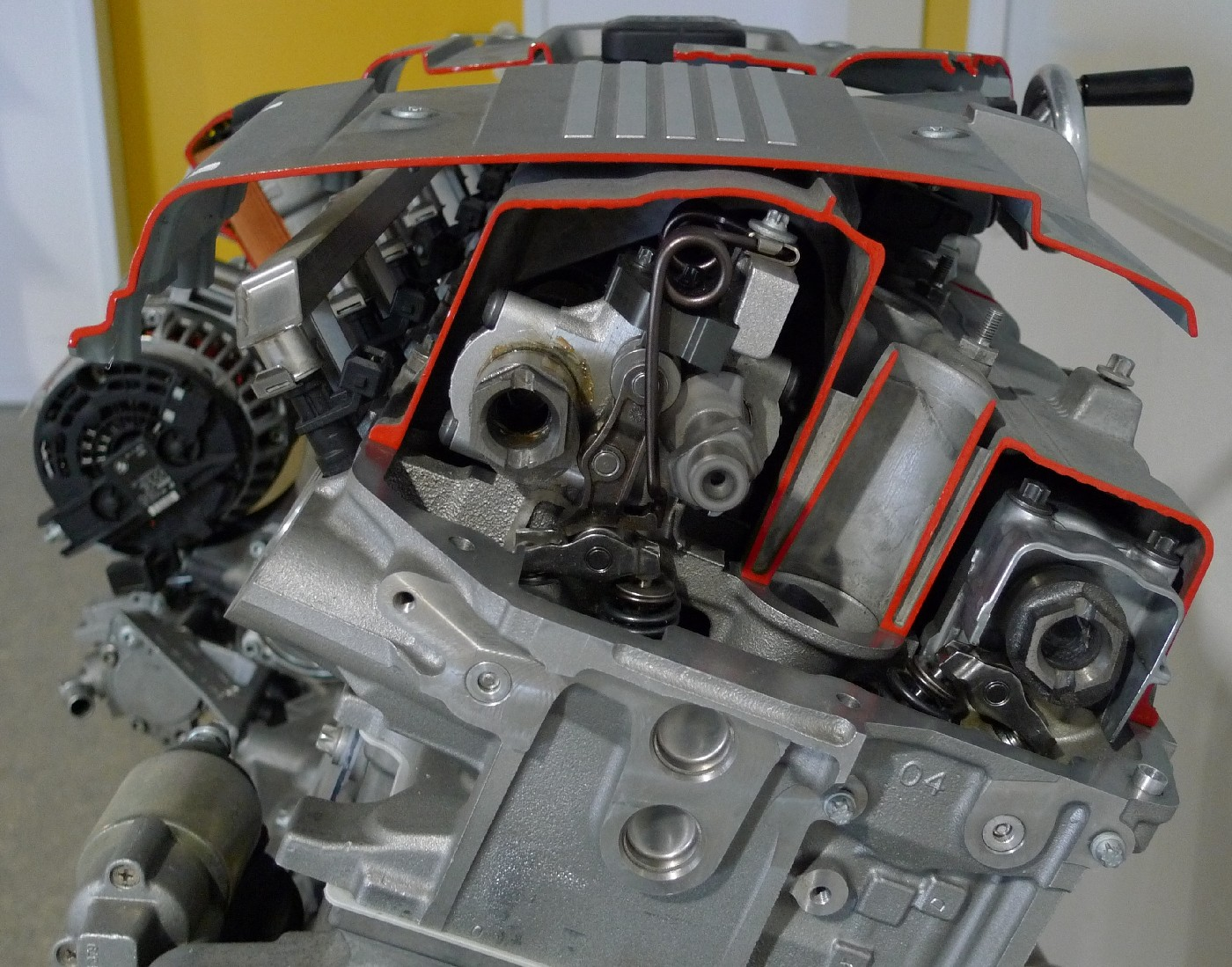
Rear of N52, with Valvetronic visible

Compared with its M54 predecessor, the N52 features Valvetronic (variable valve lift), a lighter block due to the use of a magnesium alloy and an electric water pump (replacing the belt-driven water pump) and a variable output oil pump. The redline was increased from 6,500 rpm to 7,000 rpm, except for N52B25 (130 kW).

Like the M54, the N52 uses electronic throttle control and variable valve timing (double-VANOS). Higher output versions of the N52 use a three-stage variable length intake manifold (also called "DISA").

The N52 engine block is made from a combination of magnesium and aluminium. Magnesium is lighter than aluminium, however it has a greater risk of corrosion from water and may creep under load at high temperatures; this makes traditional magnesium alloys not suited for withstanding the high loads to which an engine block is exposed. Therefore, BMW used a magnesium alloy for the crankcase shell, with an aluminum 'inner block' to overcome the limitations of magnesium alloys. The cylinder liners are made of Alusil. The N52 debuted with solid cast intake and exhaust camshafts, but during production hollow "hydro-formed" camshafts were phased in to reduce weight. Some engines came from the factory equipped with one solid and one hollow camshaft as the solid shaft was being phased out. Engine performance is not affected by installation of mixed camshafts.

The engine control unit (also called "DME") varies between model years, generally before 2007 the MSV70 was used and onward the MSV80 was used. For specifically the N51 engine the MSV80.1 was used.

== Models ==
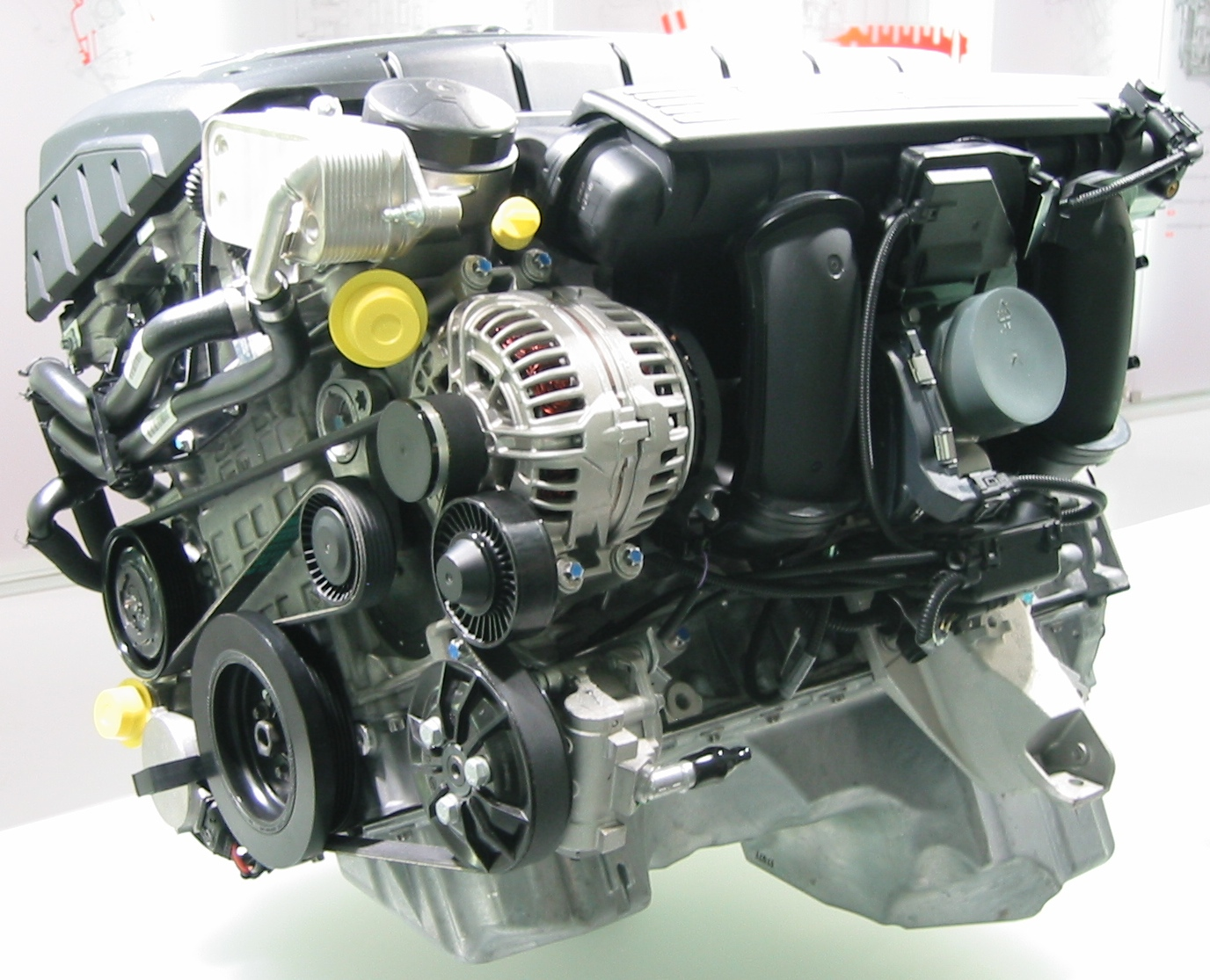
N52 shown from the intake side

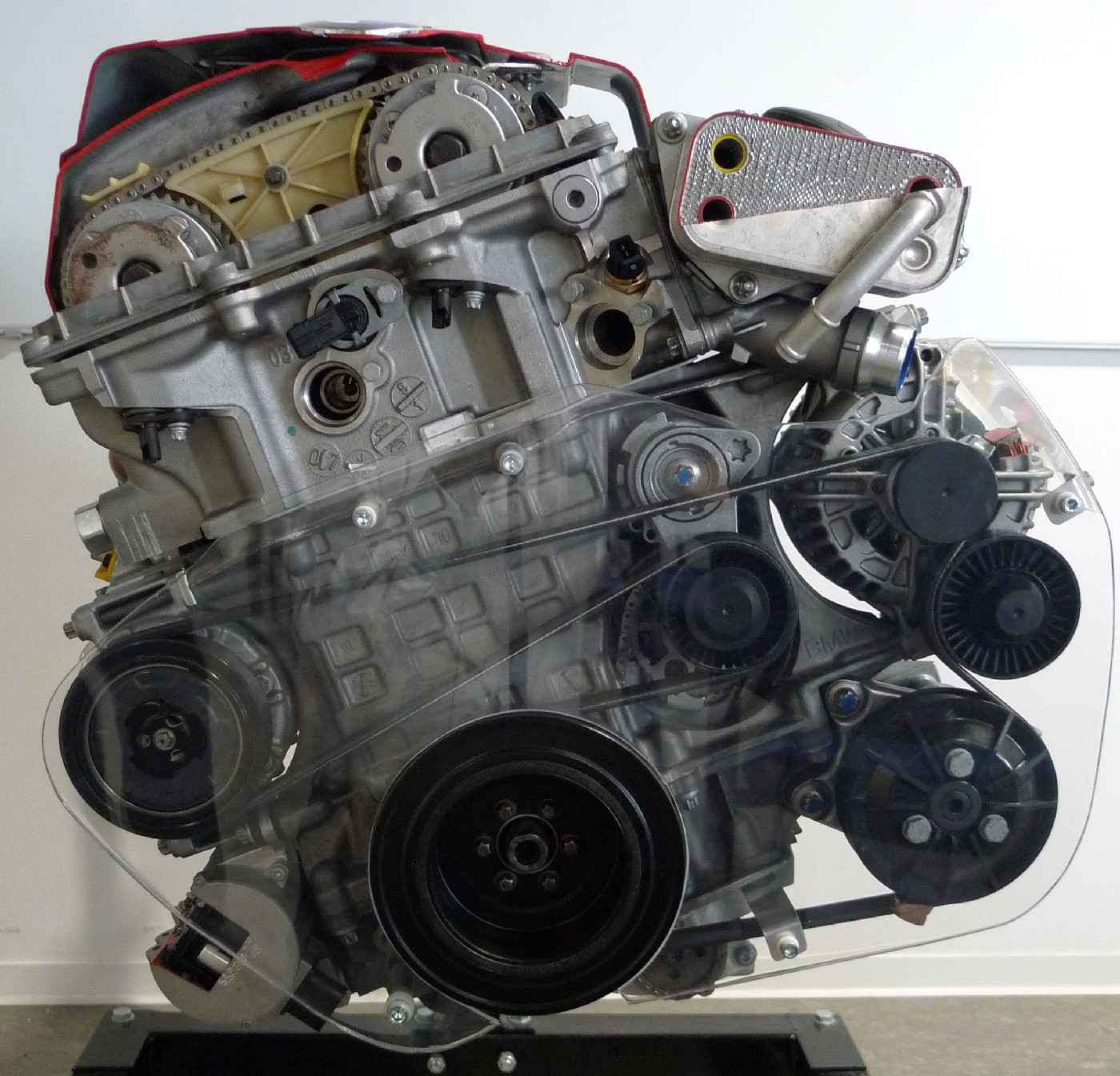
Front of the N52

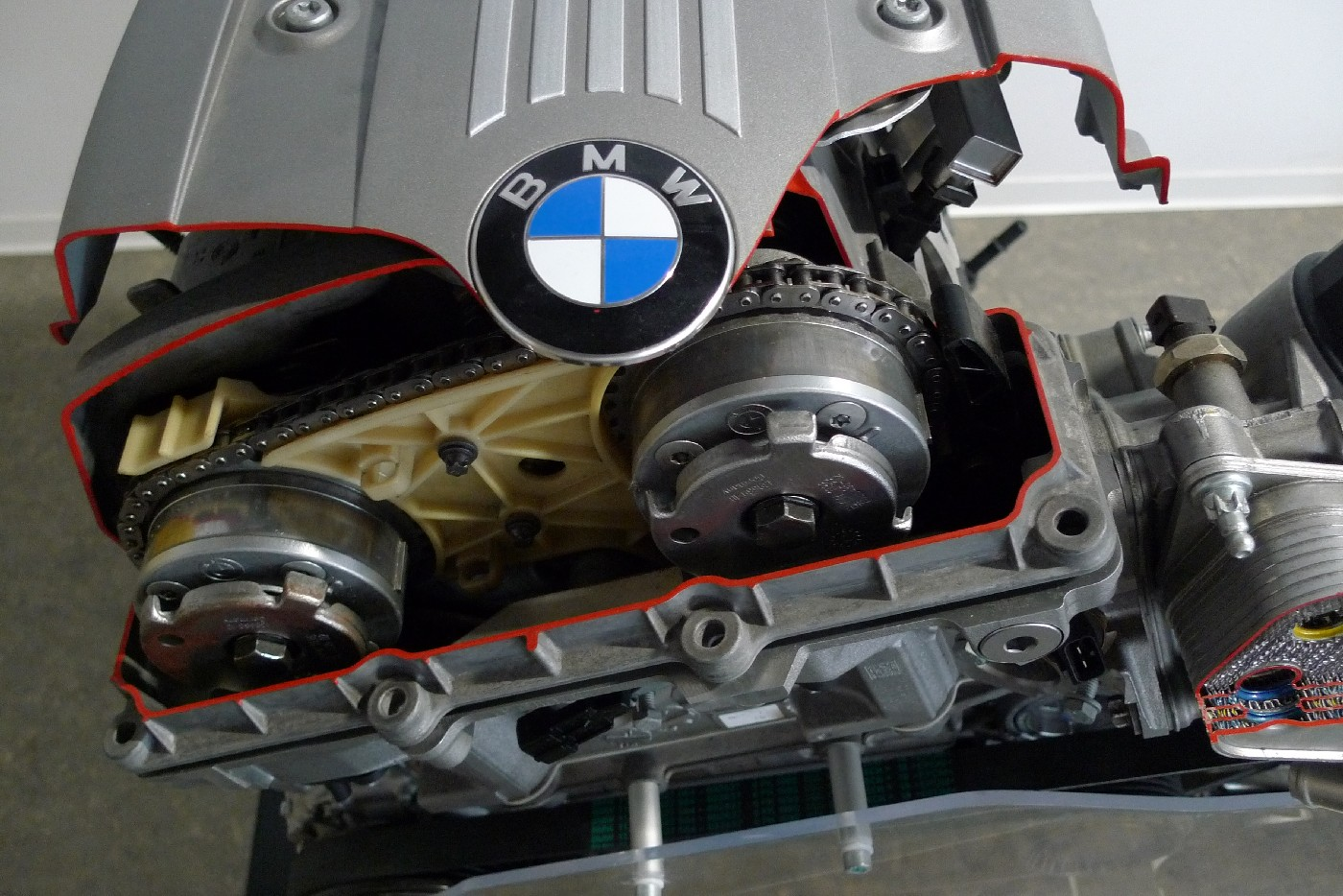
Front of the N52, with VANOS units visible

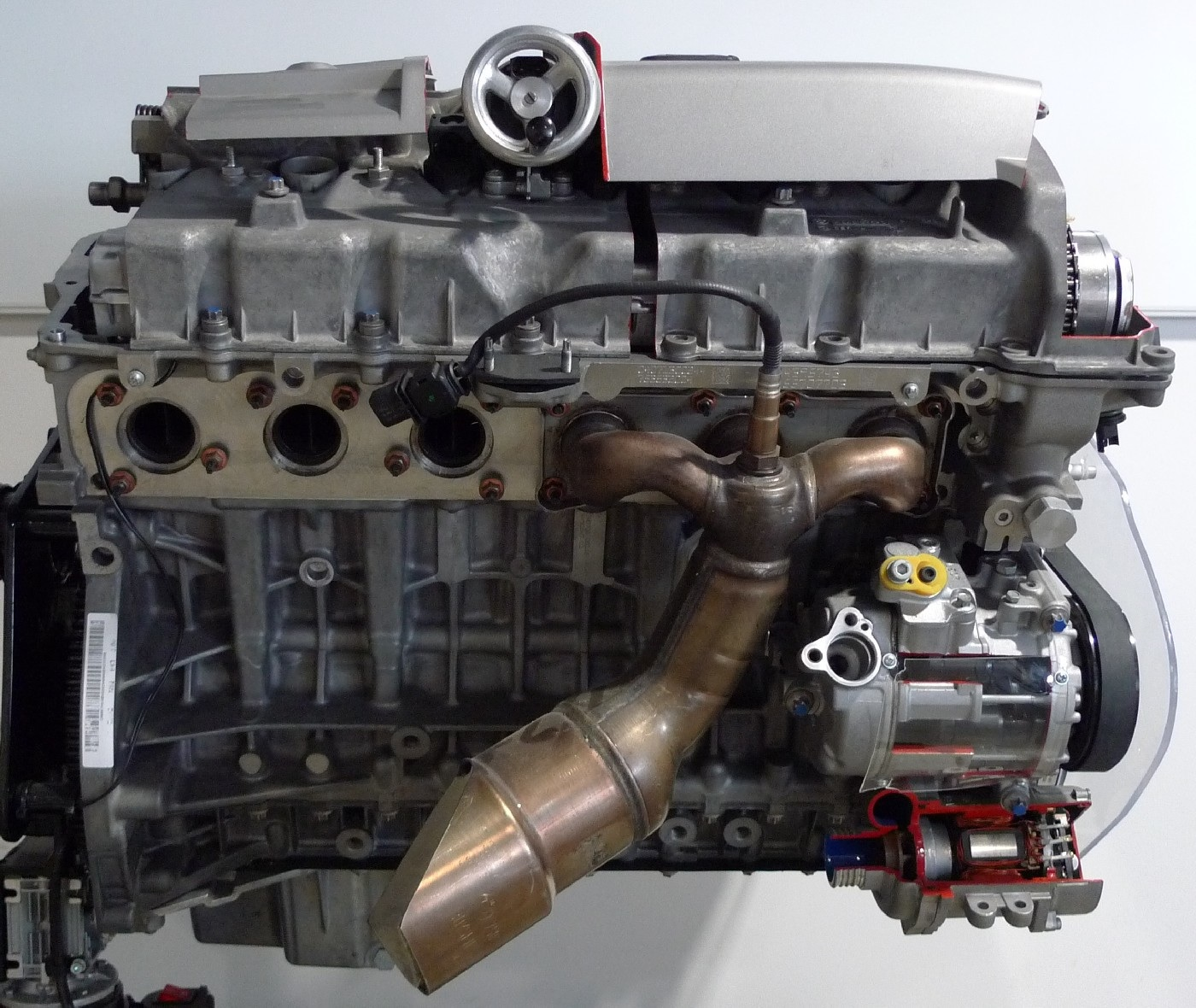
Exhaust side of the N52

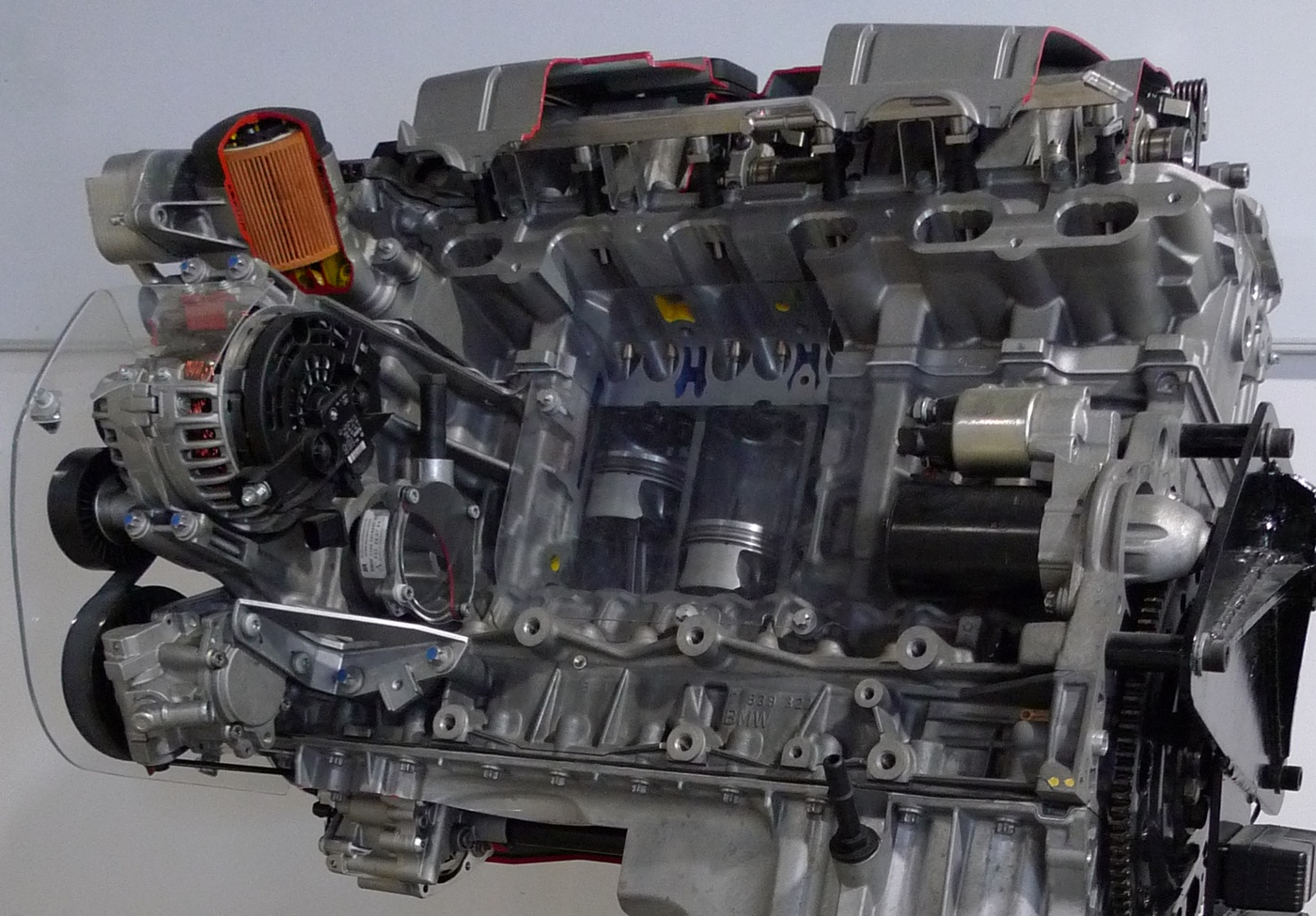
Cutaway view of the N52 intake side, showing the cylinders

Engine	Displacement	Power	Torque	Years
N52B25	2,497 cc (152.4 cu in)	130 kW (174 bhp) at 5,800 rpm	230 N⋅m (170 lb⋅ft) at 3,500-5,000 rpm	2005-2008
N52B25	2,497 cc (152.4 cu in)	150 kW (201 bhp) at 6,400 rpm	250 N⋅m (184 lb⋅ft) at 2,750 rpm	2007-2011
N52B25	2,497 cc (152.4 cu in)	160 kW (215 bhp) at 6,500 rpm	250 N⋅m (184 lb⋅ft) at 2,750-4,250 rpm	2004-2013
N52B30	2,996 cc (182.8 cu in)	160 kW (215 bhp) at 6,100 rpm	270 N⋅m (199 lb⋅ft) at 2,500-4,250 rpm	2006-2010
N52B30	2,996 cc (182.8 cu in)	160 kW (215 bhp) at 6,100 rpm	280 N⋅m (207 lb⋅ft) at 2,500-3,500 rpm	2010-2011
N52B30	2,996 cc (182.8 cu in)	170 kW (228 bhp) at 6,500 rpm	270 N⋅m (199 lb⋅ft) at 2,750 rpm	2007-2013
N52B30	2,996 cc (182.8 cu in)	180 kW (241 bhp) at 6,500 rpm	310 N⋅m (229 lb⋅ft) at 2,750 rpm	2008-2011
N52B30	2,996 cc (182.8 cu in)	190 kW (255 bhp) at 6,600 rpm	300 N⋅m (221 lb⋅ft) at 2,500-4,000 rpm	2010-2011
N52B30	2,996 cc (182.8 cu in)	190 kW (255 bhp) at 6,600 rpm	310 N⋅m (229 lb⋅ft) at 2,600 rpm	2009-2015
N52B30	2,996 cc (182.8 cu in)	195 kW (261 bhp) at 6,600 rpm	315 N⋅m (232 lb⋅ft) at 2,750-4,250 rpm	2005-2009
N52B30	2,996 cc (182.8 cu in)	200 kW (268 bhp) at 6,650 rpm	315 N⋅m (232 lb⋅ft) at 2,750 rpm	2006-2010

=== N52B25 ===
130 kW (174 bhp) Applications:

- 2006 E90 323i — Canada, Australia and Japan
- 2004-2007 E60/E61 523i
- 2006-2008 E85 Z4 2.5i

150 kW (201 bhp) Applications:

- 2007-2011 E90 323i — Canada, Australia and Japan
- 2010-2011 F10 523i
- 2009-2011 E89 Z4 sDrive23i

160 kW (215 bhp) Applications:

- 2005-2010 E83 X3 2.5si, xDrive25i
- 2005-2010 E60/E61 525i, 525xi — except U.S. and Canada
- 2004-2013 E90/E91/E92/E93 325i, 325xi — except U.S. and Canada
- 2005-2008 E85 Z4 2.5si

=== N52B30 ===
The 3.0 L (183 cu in) models of the N52 have a bore of 85 mm (3.35 in), a stroke of 88 mm (3.46 in) and a compression ratio of 10.7:1. Variations in power output are often due to different intake manifolds and variations of engine management software.

160 kW (215 bhp) Applications:

- 2006-2007 E90/E92/E93 325i, 325xi — U.S. and Canada only
- 2006-2007 E60/E61 525i, 525xi — U.S. and Canada only
- 2006-2008 E85 Z4 3.0i — U.S. and Canada only
- 2008-2011 E82/E88 125i
- 2007-2010 E60 528i korean spec (Dme 525i)
- 2009-2010 E84 X1 xDrive25i

170 kW (228 bhp) Applications:

- 2007-2013 E90/E91/E92/E93 328i, 328xi — U.S. and Canada only
- 2008-2013 E82/E88 128i — U.S. and Canada only
- 2008-2010 E60/E61 528i — U.S. and Canada only

180 kW (241 bhp) Applications:

- 2010-2011 F10 528i — U.S

190 kW (255 bhp) Applications:

- 2004-2007 E63/E64 630i
- 2005-2007 E90/E92/E93 330i, 330xi
- 2005-2008 E65/E66 730i
- 2005-2009 E60/E61 530i, 530xi
- 2009-2015 F01 730i
- 2008-2011 E89 Z4 sDrive30i
- 2009-2011 E84 X1 xDrive28i
- 2009-2012 E87 130i
- 2010-2011 F25 X3 28i
- 2010-2011 F10 528i, 530i asia and euro.

195 kW (261 bhp) Applications:

- 2005-2008 E85/E86 Z4 3.0si
- 2006-2009 E87 130i

200 kW (268 bhp) Applications:

- 2006–2010 E83 X3 3.0si
- 2006-2010 E70 X5 3.0si, xDrive30i
- 2007-2010 E63/E64 630i

=== N51B30 ===
The N51 engine is a SULEV version of the N52 that was sold in parts of the United States that had SULEV legislation. Differences to the N52 versions include a variable-length intake manifold ("DISA") with three stages instead of one, and the static compression ratio lowered from 10.7:1 to 10.0:1. Additionally, the N51 features a secondary air pump ("SAP") not present in the ULEV N52.

== Recalls ==
- In 2017, BMW recalled 740,000 six-cylinder models due to reports of the heater for the crankcase ventilation valve short-circuiting and causing a fire.
- In 2023, 155,627 vehicles were issued a recall for VANOS bolts that could loosen or break over time.

== See also ==
- BMW
- List of BMW engines
