= N43 =

N43 may refer to:

- N43 (Long Island bus)
- BMW N43, an automobile engine
- Braden Airpark in Easton, Pennsylvania, United States
- Nebraska Highway 43, in the United States
- Nyungwe language, a Bantu language of Mozambique
- Umbugarla language, an extinct Australian Aboriginal language
