= BMW N45 =

BMW N45 engine

Overview
- Production: 2004-2011

Layout
- Configuration: Inline-4
- Displacement: 1.6 L (1,596 cc); 2.0 L (1,997 cc)
- Cylinder bore: 84 mm (3.31 in); 85 mm (3.35 in)
- Piston stroke: 72 mm (2.83 in); 88 mm (3.46 in)
- Cylinder block material: Aluminium
- Cylinder head material: Aluminium
- Valvetrain: DOHC, with VVT

Combustion
- Fuel type: Petrol

Chronology
- Predecessor: BMW N40
- Successor: BMW N43

The BMW N45 is a naturally aspirated four-cylinder petrol engine which replaced the BMW N40 and was produced from 2004-2011. It was produced alongside the BMW N46 engine and only sold in some countries, where vehicle taxes favoured small-displacement engines.

The N45 is based on the N46, however it does not have balance shafts or Valvetronic (variable valve lift). As per the N42 and N46, the N45 has double-VANOS (variable valve timing). In 2007, the N45 was updated, which was called the N45N.

In 2007, the N45's successor - the BMW N43 - was introduced. However, the direct-injected N43 was not sold in countries with high-sulfur fuel, so the N45 continued to be produced alongside the N43. The N45 was phased out as new generation vehicles were released with the turbocharged BMW N13 four-cylinder engine.

== Models ==
| Engine | Displacement | Power | Torque | Years |
|---|---|---|---|---|
| N45B16 | 1,596 cc (97.4 cu in) | 85 kW (114 bhp) at 6,000 rpm | 150 N⋅m (111 lb⋅ft) at 4,300 rpm | 2004-2011 |
| N45B20S | 1,997 cc (121.9 cu in) | 127 kW (170 bhp) at 7,000 rpm | 200 N⋅m (148 lb⋅ft) at 4,250 rpm | 2006 |

=== N45B16 ===
Applications:

- 2004–2011 E81/E87 116i
- 2006–2009 E90/E91 316i

=== N45B20S ===
The N45 was enlarged to 1,997 cc (121.9 cu in), to homologate the E90 320si for the World Touring Car Championship. The N45 was chosen over the N46, because its lack of variable valve lift allows higher engine speeds. Instead, the engine used dual overhead camshafts and 16 valves. The main visual difference is the carbon fiber valve cover.

Applications:

- 2006 E90 320si (Limited production model)

== See also ==
- BMW
- List of BMW engines
- BMW N43
- BMW N46
