= BMW N46 =

BMW N46 engine
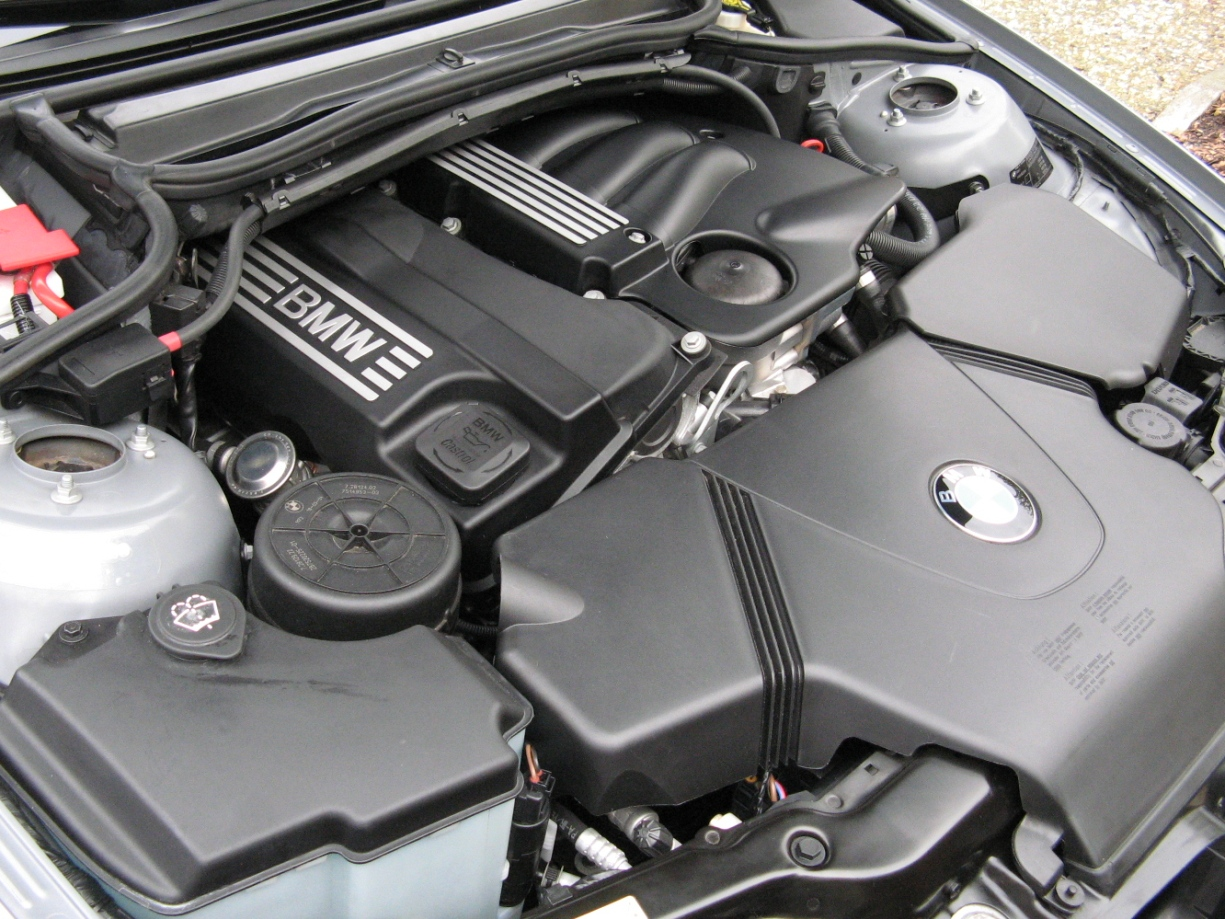

Overview
- Production: 2004-2015

Layout
- Configuration: Inline-4
- Displacement: 1.8 L (1,796 cc); 2.0 L (1,995 cc)
- Cylinder bore: 84 mm (3.31 in)
- Piston stroke: 81 mm (3.19 in); 90 mm (3.54 in)
- Cylinder block material: Aluminium
- Cylinder head material: Aluminium
- Valvetrain: DOHC, with VVT & VVL

Combustion
- Fuel type: Petrol

Chronology
- Predecessor: BMW N42
- Successor: BMW N43

The BMW N46 is a naturally aspirated inline-four petrol piston engine which replaced the BMW N42 and was produced from 2004 to 2015.

The N46 serves as the basis for the smaller BMW N45 engine (which does not have Valvetronic).

In 2007, the N46's successor - the BMW N43 - was introduced. However, the direct-injected N43 was not sold in countries with high-sulfur fuel, so the N46 continued to be produced alongside the N43. The N46 continued production until 2015, when the last N46 models were replaced by the BMW N13 turbocharged four-cylinder engine.

== Design ==
Compared with its N42 predecessor, the N46 features a revised crankshaft, intake manifold and valvetrain. In 2007, the N46 was updated, which was known as the N46N. Changes included the intake manifold, exhaust camshaft and the engine control unit was changed from Bosch Motronic version ME9.2 to version MV17.4.6. The redline is 6,500 rpm.

== Versions ==
Version	Displacement	Power	Torque	Year
N46B18	1,796 cc (109.6 cu in)	85 kW (114 bhp) at 5,500 rpm	175 N⋅m (129 lb⋅ft) at 3,750 rpm	2004
N46B20U1	1,995 cc (121.7 cu in)	95 kW (127 bhp) at 5,750 rpm	180 N⋅m (133 lb⋅ft) at 3,250 rpm	2005
N46B20U2	1,995 cc (121.7 cu in)	100 kW (134 bhp) at 5,750 rpm	180 N⋅m (133 lb⋅ft) at 3,250 rpm	2007
N46B20U0	1,995 cc (121.7 cu in)	105 kW (141 bhp) at 6,000 rpm	200 N⋅m (148 lb⋅ft) at 3,750 rpm	2007
N46B20O1	1,995 cc (121.7 cu in)	110 kW (148 bhp) at 6,200 rpm	200 N⋅m (148 lb⋅ft) at 3,600 rpm	2004
N46B20O1	1,995 cc (121.7 cu in)	110 kW (148 bhp) at 6,200 rpm	200 N⋅m (148 lb⋅ft) at 3,750 rpm	2004
N46NB20	1,995 cc (121.7 cu in)	127 kW (170 bhp) at 6,400 rpm	210 N⋅m (155 lb⋅ft) at 4,100 rpm	2007

=== N46B18 ===
The N46B18 has a 1,796 cc (109.6 cu in) displacement and produces 85 kW (114 bhp) and 175 N⋅m (129 lb⋅ft).

Applications:

- 2004-2005 E46 316i/316ti

=== N46B20U0 ===
The N46B20U0 produces 105 kW (141 bhp) and 200 N⋅m (148 lb⋅ft).

- 2007-2008 E90 318i

=== N46B20U1 ===
The N46B20U1 produces 95 kW (127 bhp) and 180 N⋅m (133 lb⋅ft).

Applications:

- 2005-2007 E87 118i
- 2005-2007 E90/E91 318i

=== N46B20U2 ===
The N46B20U2 produces 100 kW (134 bhp) and 180 N⋅m (133 lb⋅ft). It was used instead of the N43 engine in countries with high-sulfur fuel.

Applications:

- 2007-2011 E81/E87 118i
- 2007-2013 E90 318i

=== N46B20A ===
The N46B20A produces 105 kW (141 bhp) and 200 N⋅m (148 lb⋅ft).

Applications:

- 2004-2006 E46 318i, 318Ci and 318ti

=== N46B20O1 ===
The N46B20O1 produces 110 kW (148 bhp) and 200 N⋅m (148 lb⋅ft). On models with secondary air injection, peak torque occurs at 3750 rpm instead of 3600 rpm.

Applications:

- 2005-2006 E46 318Ci
- 2004-2007 E83 X3 2.0i
- 2005-2008 E85 Z4 2.0i
- 2004-2007 E87 120i
- 2005-2007 E90/E91 320i

=== N46NB20 ===
The N46B20 produces 115 kW (154 bhp) and 210 N⋅m (155 lb⋅ft). It was used instead of the N43 engine in countries with high-sulfur fuel.

Applications:

- 2007-2011 E81/E82/E87/E88 120i
- 2007-2013 E90/E91/E92/E93 320i
- 2007-2010 E60 520i
- 2009-2015 E84 X1 sDrive18i / xDrive18i
- 2007-2010 E83 X3 2.0i

N46B20 engine number key code:

== See also ==
- BMW
- List of BMW engines
