= BMW 3 Series (E90) =

Fifth generation of BMW 3 Series

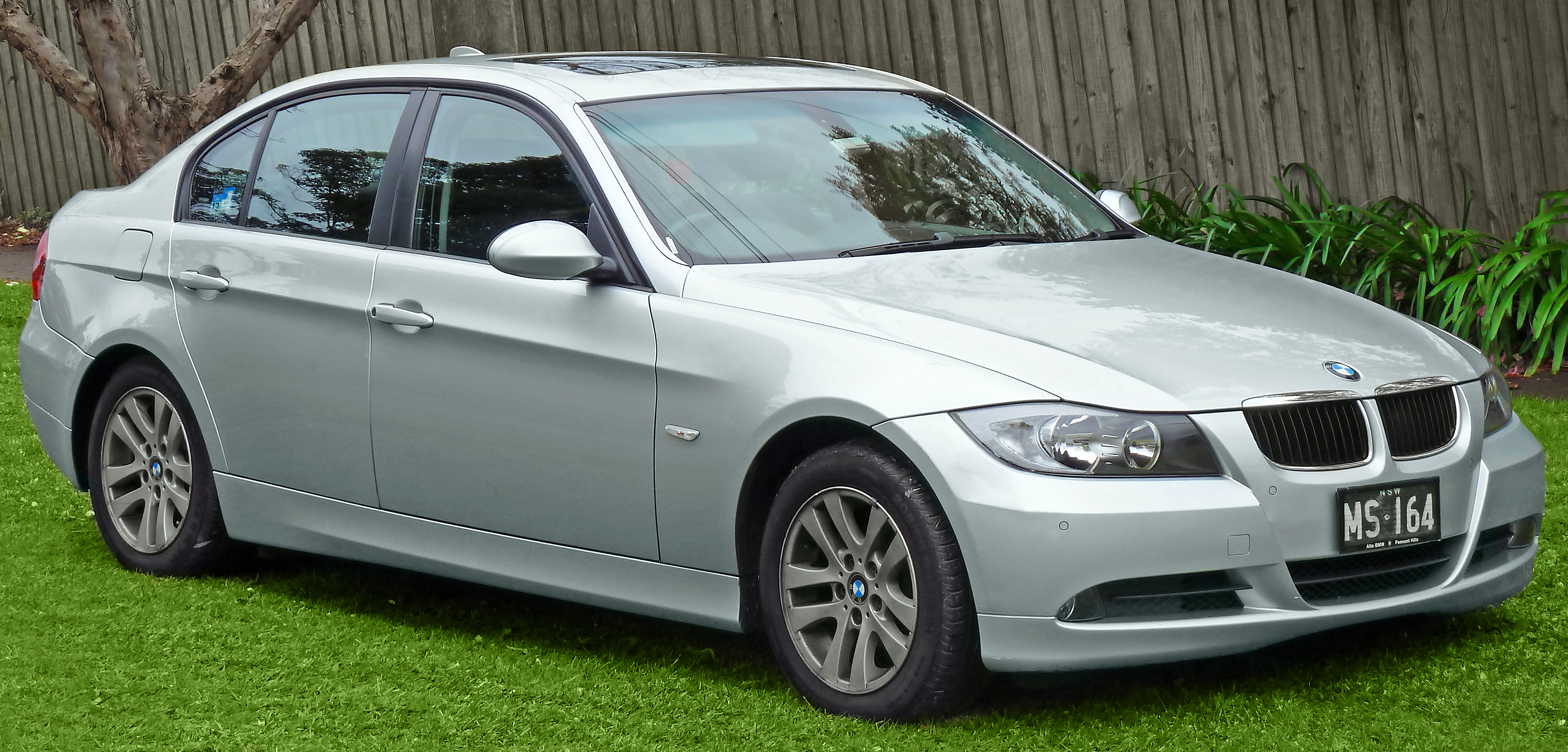

Overview
- Manufacturer: BMW
- Model code: E90 (saloon); E91 (estate); E92 (coupé); E93 (convertible)
- Production: December 2004 – October 2013
- Model years: 2006–2012 (North America)
- Assembly: Germany: Leipzig; Munich; Regensburg; South Africa: Rosslyn (BMW SA); China: Shenyang (BBA); Mexico: Toluca (BMW Mexico); Egypt: 6th of October City (BAG); India: Chennai (BMW India); Thailand: Rayong (BMW Thailand); Indonesia: Jakarta (Gaya Motor); Malaysia: Kulim, Kedah (Inokom); Shah Alam (AMIM); Russia: Kaliningrad (Avtotor)
- Designer: Joji Nagashima (saloon and estate); Marc Michael Markefka (coupé and convertible)

Body and chassis
- Class: Compact executive car (D)
- Body style: 4-door sedan/saloon (E90); 5-door wagon/estate (E91); 2-door coupé (E92); 2-door convertible (E93)
- Layout: Front-engine, rear-wheel-drive; Front-engine, all-wheel-drive (xDrive)
- Platform: BMW L2
- Related: BMW M3 (E90/E92/E93); BMW Z4 (E89); BMW 1 Series (E82/E88); BMW X1 (E84)

Powertrain
- Engine: Petrol: 1.6–2.0 L N43/N45/N46 I4; 2.5–3.0 L N52/N53 I6; 3.0 L N54/N55 I6 turbo; 4.0–4.4 L S65 V8 (M3); Diesel: 2.0 L M47/N47 I4; 3.0 L M57/N57 I6
- Transmission: 5-speed manual (320si WTCC only); 6-speed manual; 6-speed ZF 6HP automatic; 6-speed GM 6L45 automatic; 7-speed dual-clutch (M3 model)

Dimensions
- Wheelbase: 2,760 mm (108.7 in)
- Length: 4,520–4,610 mm (178.0–181.5 in)
- Width: 1,780–1,820 mm (70.1–71.7 in)
- Height: 1,380–1,420 mm (54.3–55.9 in)
- Curb weight: 1,425–1,825 kg (3,141.6–4,023.4 lb)

Chronology
- Predecessor: BMW 3 Series (E46)
- Successor: BMW 3 Series (F30/F31) (saloons and estates); BMW 4 Series (F32/F33) (coupés and convertibles)

The fifth generation of the BMW 3 Series range of compact executive cars is designated under the model codes E90 (saloon), E91 (estate, marketed as 'Touring'), E92 (coupé) and E93 (convertible). The model was introduced in December 2004, and produced by BMW until October 2013 and is often collectively referred to as the E90, E9x, or occasionally, the E92.

The E92 335i was the first 3 Series model produced with a turbocharged petrol engine. It was also the first 3 Series to include the iDrive operating system, which consists of navigation, infotainment and essential vehicle functions. The E9x saw the introduction of run-flat tyres to the 3 Series range. Models with run-flat tires are not equipped with a spare tyre.

The E90/E92/E93 M3 is the only generation of M3 to be powered by a V8 engine. Introduced in 2007, it uses the BMW S65 naturally aspirated V8 engine and was produced in saloon, coupé and convertible body styles.

Following the introduction of the F30/F31 3 Series in February 2012, the E90/E91 saloons and estates were phased out. However due to their later introduction, the E92/E93 coupés and convertibles remained in production through the 2013 model year, after which they were replaced by the F32/F33 4 Series models.

== Development and launch ==
The design for the fifth generation 3 Series was frozen in mid-2002, approximately 30 months before the start of production. The saloon and estate were designed by Joji Nagashima. Marc Michael Markefka designed the coupé and convertible.

The range was introduced in March 2005 for MY2005 with the saloon and estate body styles. The coupé was introduced in 2006 and the convertible was introduced in 2007, both for MY2007. In the United States, the 330i was initially the top version (aside from the M3); for model year 2006 only, the 325i was available. This was replaced by the somewhat less powerful 328i for 2007.

Significant cosmetic and mechanical changes were done to improve the design and performance compared to the previous generation. The E90 series is larger than its predecessor, with a longer wheelbase, wider tracks, and a roomier interior.

== Body styles ==
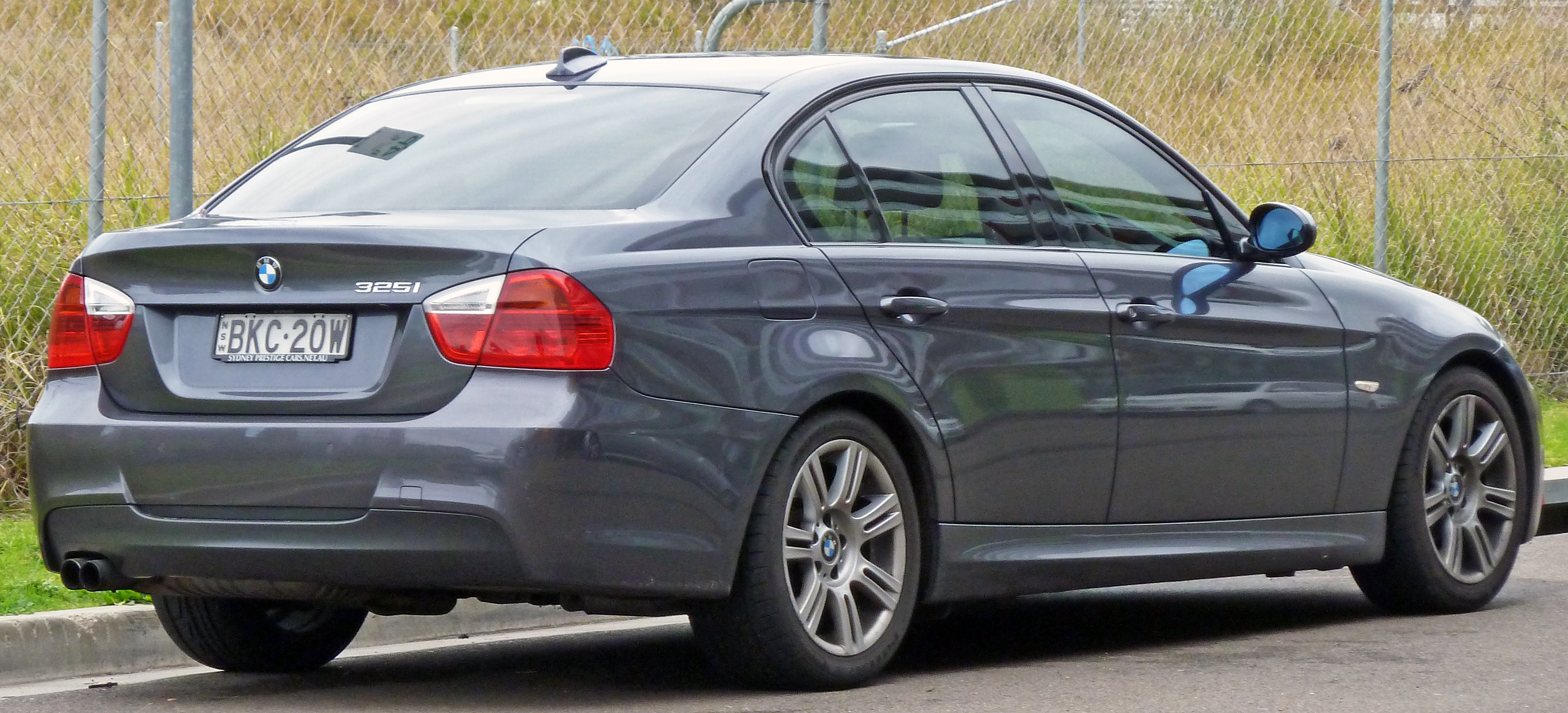
E90 Sedan

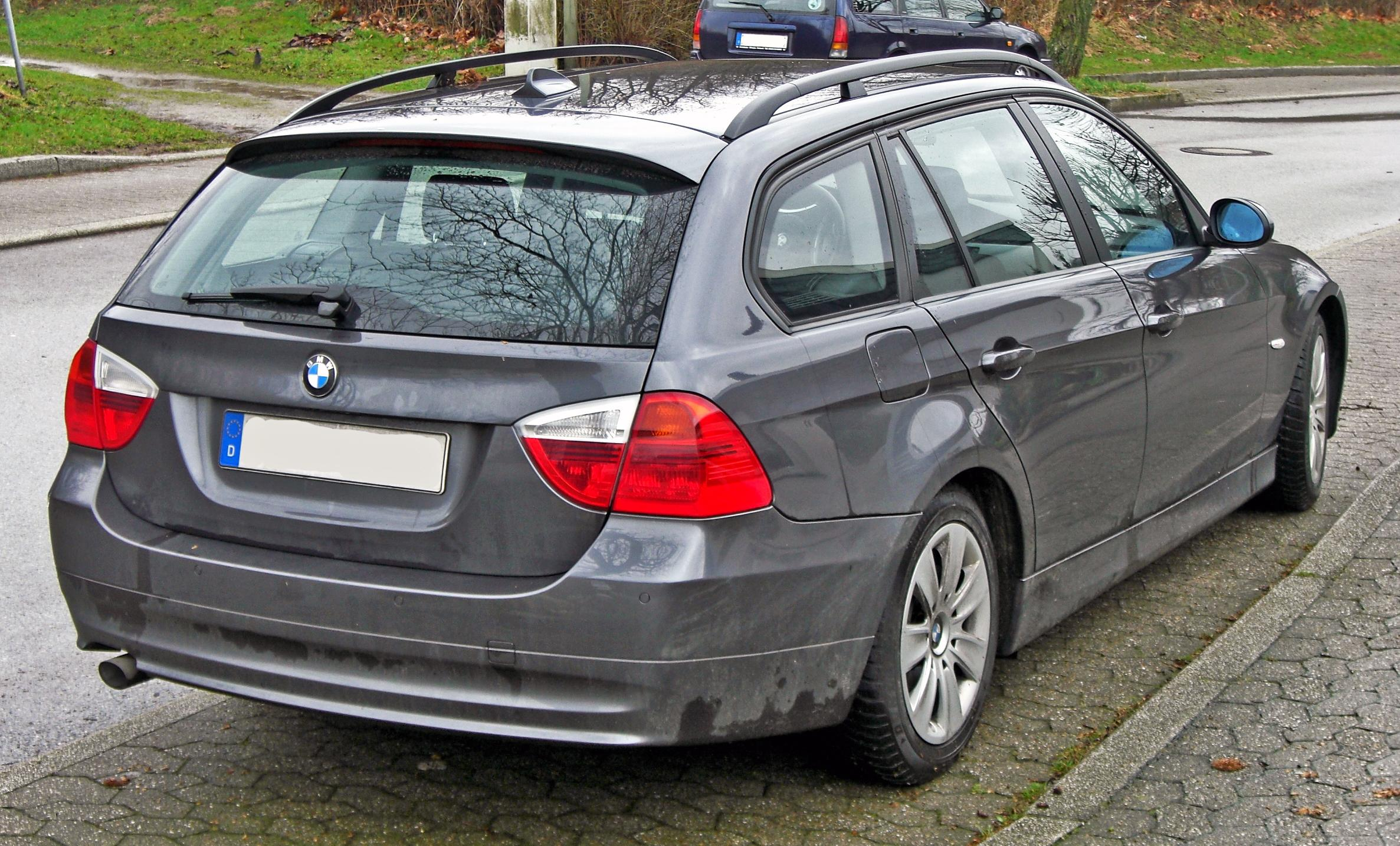
E91 Touring

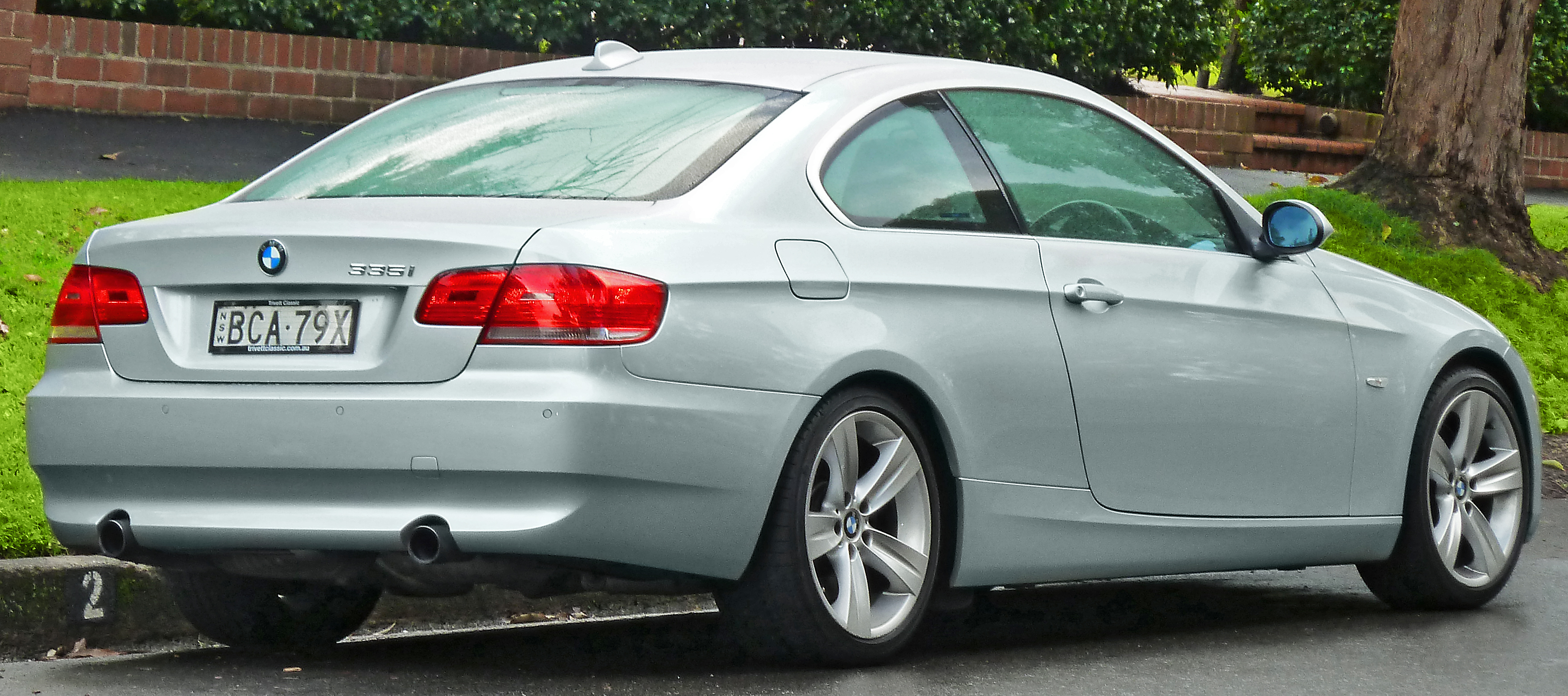
E92 Coupé

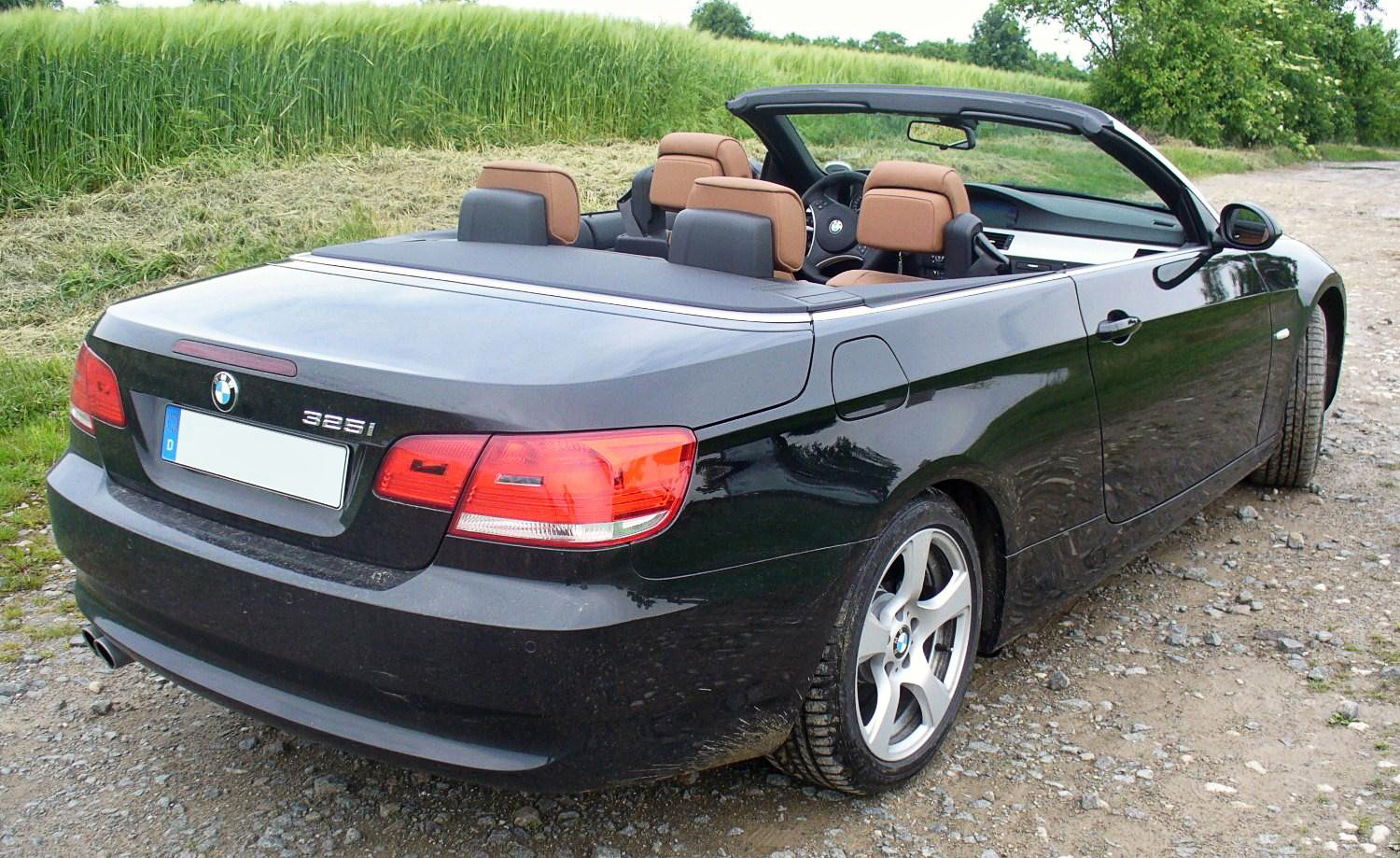
E93 Convertible

=== Sedan (E90) ===
The sedan model was the first model sold of the E90/E91/E92/E93 3 series, being launched on 5 March 2005 for the 2006 model year. Production continued until a facelift revision was made for the 2009 model year. Production of the E90 concluded after the 2011 model year, succeeded by the F30 for 2012.

=== Touring (E91) ===
The E91 wagon/estate models were marketed as 'Touring' in Europe and 'Sports Wagon' in North America. Optional equipment included a panoramic sunroof, which extends to the rear passenger area. Trim levels typically were similar to the E90 saloon, however the M3 was not produced in the estate body style.

Several markets outside Europe only offered a small subset of models in the estate body style. In the United States and Canada, the only estate model available prior to 2007 was the 325xi, and then the 328i and 328xi from model year 2007 onwards. The Australian market received only a handful of models which included the 320i, 320d and 323i until the end of its production. No X-Drive E9x models were ever sold in Australia.

=== Coupé (E92) ===
In July 2006, one year after the saloon was introduced, the E92 coupé body style was unveiled.

Compared with previous generations of the 3 Series, the coupé has more external styling differences to the saloon models. These include the tail-light design (L-shaped on the coupe), more steeply angled headlights and smaller side windows. As per its E46 predecessor, the doors of the coupe are longer and have frameless door windows, the rear seat holds two passengers (compared with a three-person bench for the saloon) with a rear centre console tray and the front seatbelts are on motorised arms that extend from the B-pillar to hand the seatbelts to the driver and/or passenger.

The E92 was the last generation to include coupé (and convertible) body styles as a part of the 3 Series range. For later generations, these body styles are marketed as the 4 Series. Despite the E90/E91 being phased out for the F30/F31 after the 2011 model year, the E92/E93 continued through the 2013 model year. It was then succeeded by the F32/F33 for the 2014 model year.

=== Convertible (E93) ===
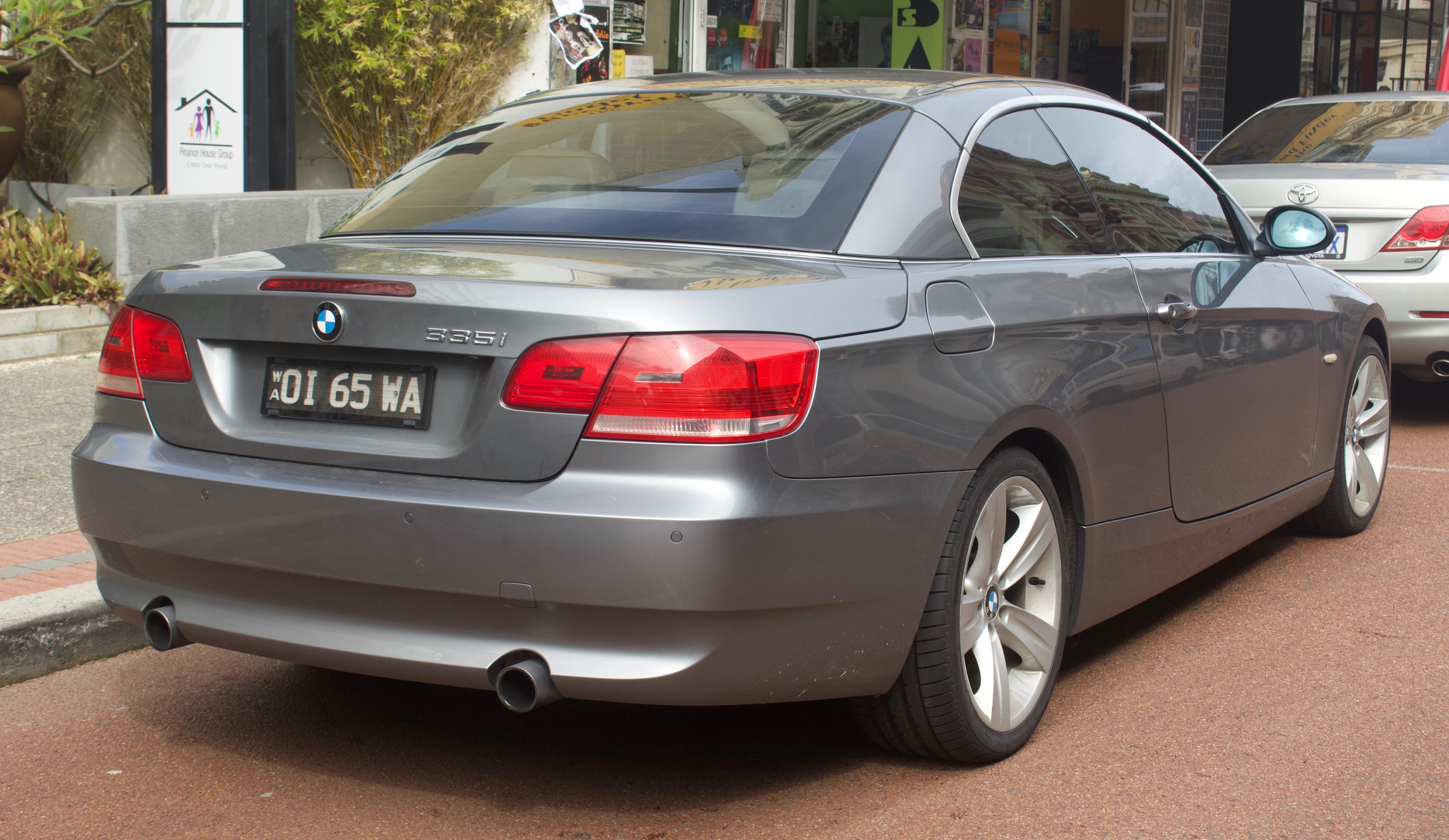
E93 with roof raised

The E93 convertible was BMW's first model to use a retractable hardtop (folding metal roof), instead of the cloth roof as previously used. The E93 was one of first retractable hardtops in its price range. The "Comfort Access" option allows the roof to be raised and lowered using the key fob. The E93's side windows are 30 per cent larger than its E46 convertible predecessor, resulting in a 38 per cent increase in visibility.

The BMW 3 Series convertible was often priced higher than direct rivals, however reviewers have praised its passenger/boot space (even with the roof down), driving dynamics, weight and chassis rigidity.

== Engines ==
=== Petrol ===
Official specifications are as follows:

Model	Years	Engine	Power	Torque
316i	04/2006-08/2011	N45B16 straight-4 N.A	85 kW (114 hp) at 6,000 rpm	150 N⋅m (110 lbf⋅ft) at 4,300 rpm
316i	09/2007–10/2011	N43B16 straight-4 N.A	90 kW (121 hp) at 6,000 rpm	160 N⋅m (120 lbf⋅ft) at 4,250 rpm
318i	09/2005–03/2007	N46B20 straight-4 N.A	95 kW (127 hp) at 5,750 rpm	180 N⋅m (130 lbf⋅ft) at 3,250 rpm
318i	09/2007–06/2012	N43B20 straight-4 N.A.	105 kW (141 hp) at 6,000 rpm	190 N⋅m (140 lbf⋅ft) at 4,250 rpm
320i	01/2005–03/2007	N46B20 straight-4 N.A.	110 kW (148 hp) at 6,200 rpm	200 N⋅m (150 lbf⋅ft) at 3,600 rpm
320i	09/2007–06/2012	N43B20 straight-4 N.A	125 kW (168 hp) at 6,700 rpm	210 N⋅m (150 lbf⋅ft) at 4,250 rpm
320si	05/2006–08/2007	N45B20 straight-4 N.A.	127 kW (170 hp) at 7,000 rpm	200 N⋅m (150 lbf⋅ft) at 4,250 rpm
323i	01/2005–03/2007	N52B25 straight-6 N.A.	130 kW (174 hp) at 5,800 rpm	230 N⋅m (170 lbf⋅ft) at 3,500–5,000 rpm
323i	09/2007–10/2010	N52B25 straight-6 N.A.	149 kW (200 hp) at 6,000 rpm	244 N⋅m (180 lbf⋅ft) at 4,000 rpm
325i	01/2005–08/2007	N52B25 straight-6 N.A. (Europe)	160 kW (215 hp) at 6,500 rpm	250 N⋅m (180 lbf⋅ft) at 2,750–4,250 rpm
325i	01/2005–08/2007	N52B30 straight-6 N.A. (North America)	160 kW (215 hp) at 6,500 rpm	251 N⋅m (185 lbf⋅ft) at 2,750–4,250 rpm
325i	09/2007–06/2012	N53B30 straight-6 N.A. (Europe)	160 kW (215 hp) at 6,100 rpm	270 N⋅m (200 lbf⋅ft) at 2,400–4,200 rpm
328i	2006–10/2011	N52B30 straight-6 N.A. (North America)	172 kW (230 hp) at 6,500 rpm	271 N⋅m (200 lb⋅ft) at 2,750 rpm
330i	02/2004–03/2007	N52B30 straight-6 N.A. (Europe)	190 kW (255 hp) at 6,600 rpm	300 N⋅m (220 lbf⋅ft) at 2,500–4,000 rpm
330i	2006-2007	N52B30 straight-6 N.A. (Europe)	200 kW (268 hp) at 6,650 rpm	315 N⋅m (232 lbf⋅ft) at 2,750–4,000 rpm
330i	2005–2006	N52B30 straight-6 N.A. (North America)	190 kW (255 hp) at 6,600 rpm	298 N⋅m (220 lb⋅ft) at 2,750 rpm
330i	03/2007–10/2011	N53B30 straight-6 N.A (Europe)	200 kW (268 hp) at 6,700 rpm	320 N⋅m (240 lbf⋅ft) at 2,750–3,000 rpm
335i	09/2006–02/2010	N54B30 straight-6 twin-turbo	228 kW (306 hp) at 5,800 rpm	400 N⋅m (300 lbf⋅ft) at 1,300–5,000 rpm
335i	03/2010–06/2012	N55B30M0 straight-6 twin-scroll turbo	228 kW (306 hp) at 5,800 rpm	400 N⋅m (300 lbf⋅ft) at 1,200–5,000 rpm
M3	09/2007–07/2013	S65B40 V8 N.A.	309 kW (414 hp) at 8,300 rpm	400 N⋅m (300 lbf⋅ft) at 3,900 rpm

Since the following generation of 3 Series used turbocharged engines for the entire model range, the E90/E91/E92/E93 was the last 3 Series to be available with naturally aspirated engines.

In North American, South American, Australian and Malaysian markets the N53 was not used, instead the entire model range continued to use its predecessor, the N52 engine.

In some areas of the United States, the 328i was powered by the BMW N51 straight-six engine and sold as a SULEV model.

In some parts of the world, 4-cylinder models continued to use the N46 engine as the local fuel quality is incompatible with the N43 engine.

=== Diesel ===
Model	Years	Engine- turbo	Power	Torque
316d	09/2009–10/2011	N47D20 straight-4	85 kW (114 hp) at 4,000 rpm	260 N⋅m (190 lbf⋅ft) at 1,750–2,500 rpm
318d	09/2005–08/2007	M47D20TU2 straight-4	90 kW (121 hp) at 4,000 rpm	280 N⋅m (210 lbf⋅ft) at 1,750–2,500 rpm
318d	09/2007–02/2010	N47D20 straight-4	105 kW (141 hp) at 4,000 rpm	300 N⋅m (220 lbf⋅ft) at 1,750–2,500 rpm
318d	03/2010–06/2012	N47D20 straight-4	105 kW (141 hp) at 4,000 rpm	320 N⋅m (240 lbf⋅ft) at 1,750–2,500 rpm
320d	01/2005–08/2007	M47D20TU2 straight-4	120 kW (161 hp) at 4,000 rpm	340 N⋅m (250 lbf⋅ft) at 2,000–2,750 rpm
320d ED	03/2010–10/2011	N47D20 straight-4	120 kW (161 hp) at 3,250–4,200 rpm	380 N⋅m (280 lbf⋅ft) at 1,900–2,750 rpm
320d	09/2007–02/2010	N47D20 straight-4	130 kW (174 hp) at 4,000 rpm	350 N⋅m (260 lbf⋅ft) at 1,750–3,000 rpm
320d	03/2010–10/2011	N47D20 straight-4	135 kW (181 hp) at 4,000 rpm	380 N⋅m (280 lbf⋅ft) at 1,900–2,750 rpm
325d	09/2006–02/2010	M57D30TU2 straight-6	145 kW (194 hp) at 4,000 rpm	400 N⋅m (300 lbf⋅ft) at 1,300–3,250 rpm
325d	03/2010–09/2013	N57D30 straight-6	150 kW (201 hp) at 3,750 rpm	430 N⋅m (320 lbf⋅ft) at 1,750–2,500 rpm
330d	09/2005–09/2008	M57D30TU2 straight-6	170 kW (228 hp) at 4,000 rpm	500 N⋅m (370 lbf⋅ft) at 1,750–3,000 rpm
330d	09/2008–06/2012	N57D30OL straight-6	180 kW (241 hp) at 4,000 rpm	520 N⋅m (380 lbf⋅ft) at 1,750–3,000 rpm
335d	09/2006–06/2012	M57D30TU2 TOP straight-6	210 kW (282 hp) at 4,400 rpm	580 N⋅m (430 lbf⋅ft) at 1,750–2,250 rpm

== Suspension ==
At the front, MacPherson struts with an aluminum hub carrier and aluminum dual lower links forming a virtual pivot point are used. This design was previously used on all 5, 7 and 8 series BMW models.

The rear suspension is a 5-link Multi-link suspension, with fabricated steel subframe, fabricated steel control arms, and cast iron carrier. This design is designated "HA 5" by BMW.

== Wheels ==
The BMW E90+ has a 5x120 bolt pattern with wheel sizes ranging from 16 inch to 20 inch in diameter. There have been 49 original wheel styles produced for this model.

== Equipment ==
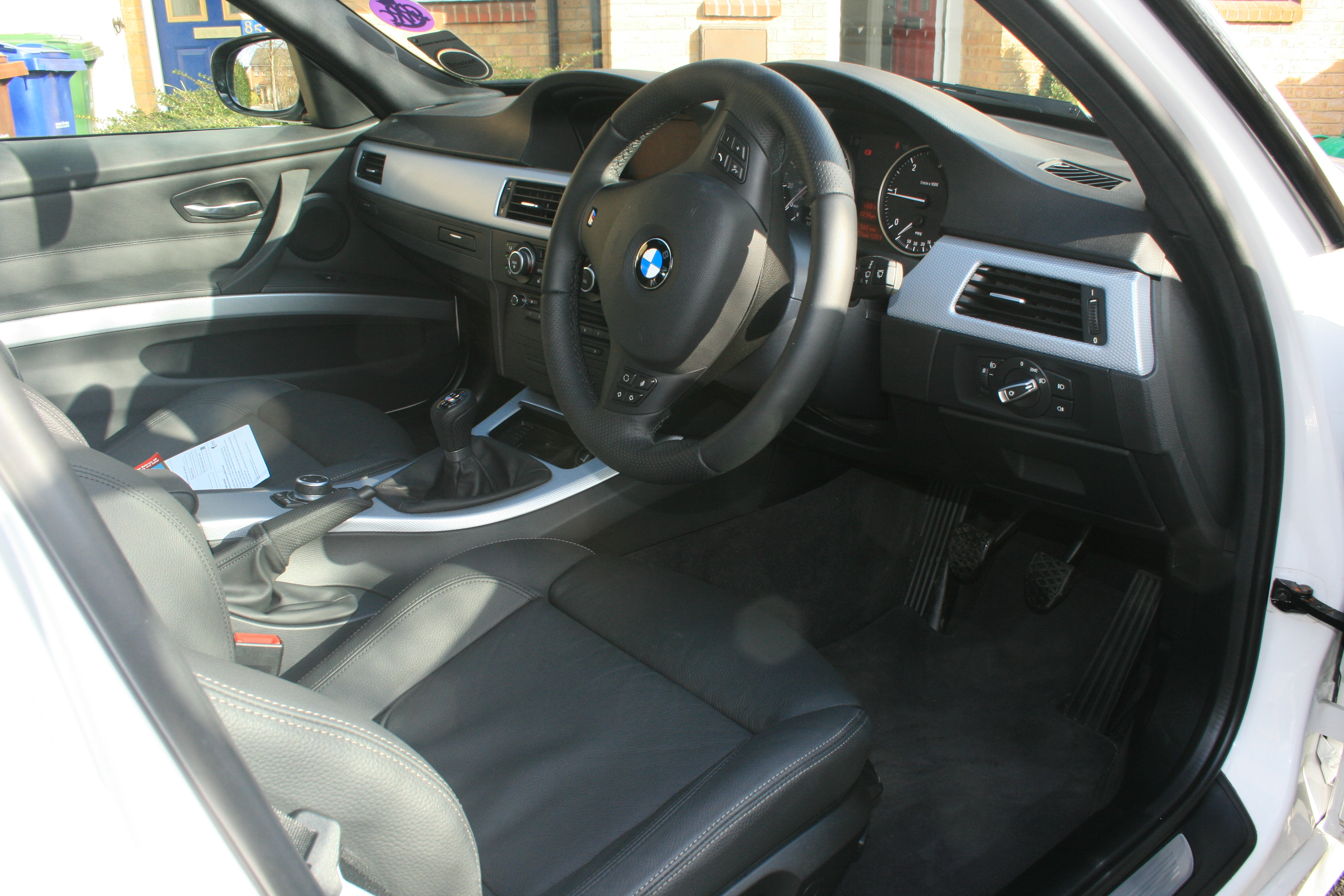
Interior

Optional features (some of which are standard on higher models) include Xenon headlamps, automatic climate control, parking sensors, power-adjustable seats, satellite navigation, glass sunroof, heated front seats, Bluetooth and USB audio input.

Optional equipment could be ordered individually or combined into packages. Optional interior colours, known as BMW Individual, were also available at extra cost.

The contents of the 'Premium Package' varied according to model year and market. It included items such as leather seats with power adjustments, memory seat function, lumbar support, auto-dimming mirrors, a digital compass, auto-folding exterior mirrors, BMW Assist w/Bluetooth, and universal garage opener.

The 'Cold Weather Package' includes headlight washers, heated front seats and split/folding rear seats with a ski bag.

The 'Sports Package' includes a leather 3-prong sports steering wheel, sports front seats, 18-inch wheels, sports suspension and an increase in the speed limiter to 155 mph (249 km/h).

The 'Technology Package' includes iDrive, navigation, keyless entry ("Comfort Access"), selectable driving modes ("M Drive"), HD radio and Electronic Damping Control.

The 'Performance Power Kit' (PPK) was introduced for the 335i and was available for installation at BMW dealerships, it included a tune that boosted engine output for the 335i to 239 kW (320 hp) & 450 N⋅m (332 lb⋅ft) for automatic transmission vehicles and 430 N⋅m (317 lb⋅ft) for manual transmission vehicles, an overall gain of 15 kW (20 hp) & 50 N⋅m (37 lb⋅ft), BMW claim their engineers have tested and designed these Performance Power Kits in such a way that equipped vehicles would not sacrifice reliability or fuel consumption, the result was a claimed 0.2 second decrease in 0 to 100 km/h (62 mph) times, the kit was available for both N54 & N55 335i vehicles, it was easily verified if a vehicle was equipped with the PPK as during installation stickers that read "BMW Performance Power Kit" were placed near the air intake on all equipped vehicles, the N55 equipped 335i vehicles also featured added exhaust burbles included as part of the PPK tune, also included in the PPK was the addition of an extra radiator, higher performance fans on the main radiator and better air flow ducts in attempt to deal with any extra heat caused by the tuning.

== M3 model ==
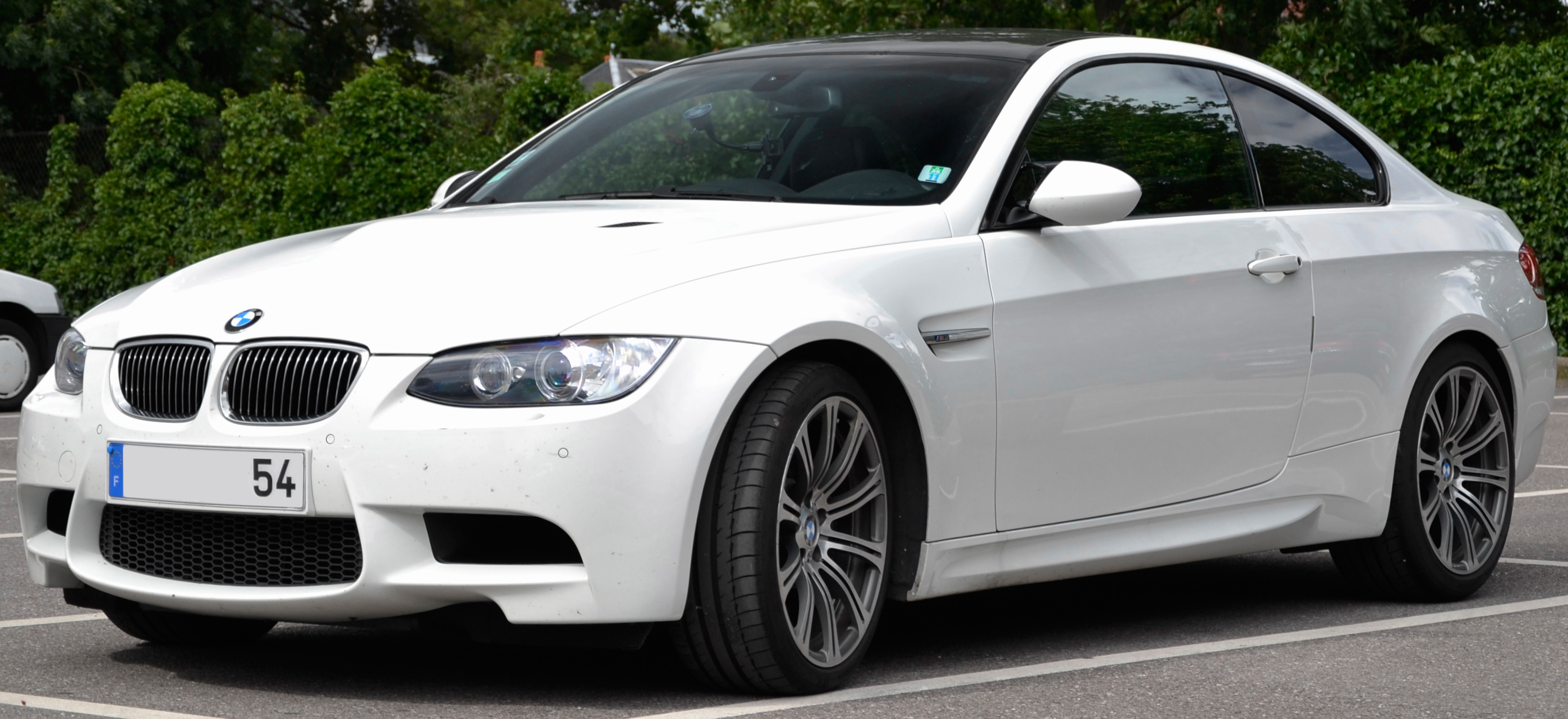
E92 M3 coupe

The M3 model was powered by the BMW S65 V8 engine and produced in saloon, coupe and convertible body styles.

== Alpina models ==
The Alpina B3 and D3 models were based on the E90/E91/E92/E93. The B3 was powered by turbocharged 6-cylinder petrol engine and the D3 was powered by a turbocharged 4-cylinder diesel engine.

== Special Editions ==
=== 320si ===
To satisfy homologation requirements for the FIA World Touring Car Championship (WTCC), BMW built 2600 units of the 320si. The car featured N45 (N45B20S) engine producing 127 kW (170 bhp), 24bhp more than the regular 320i. It also featured revised suspension and 20% lower front bumper.

=== 335is ===
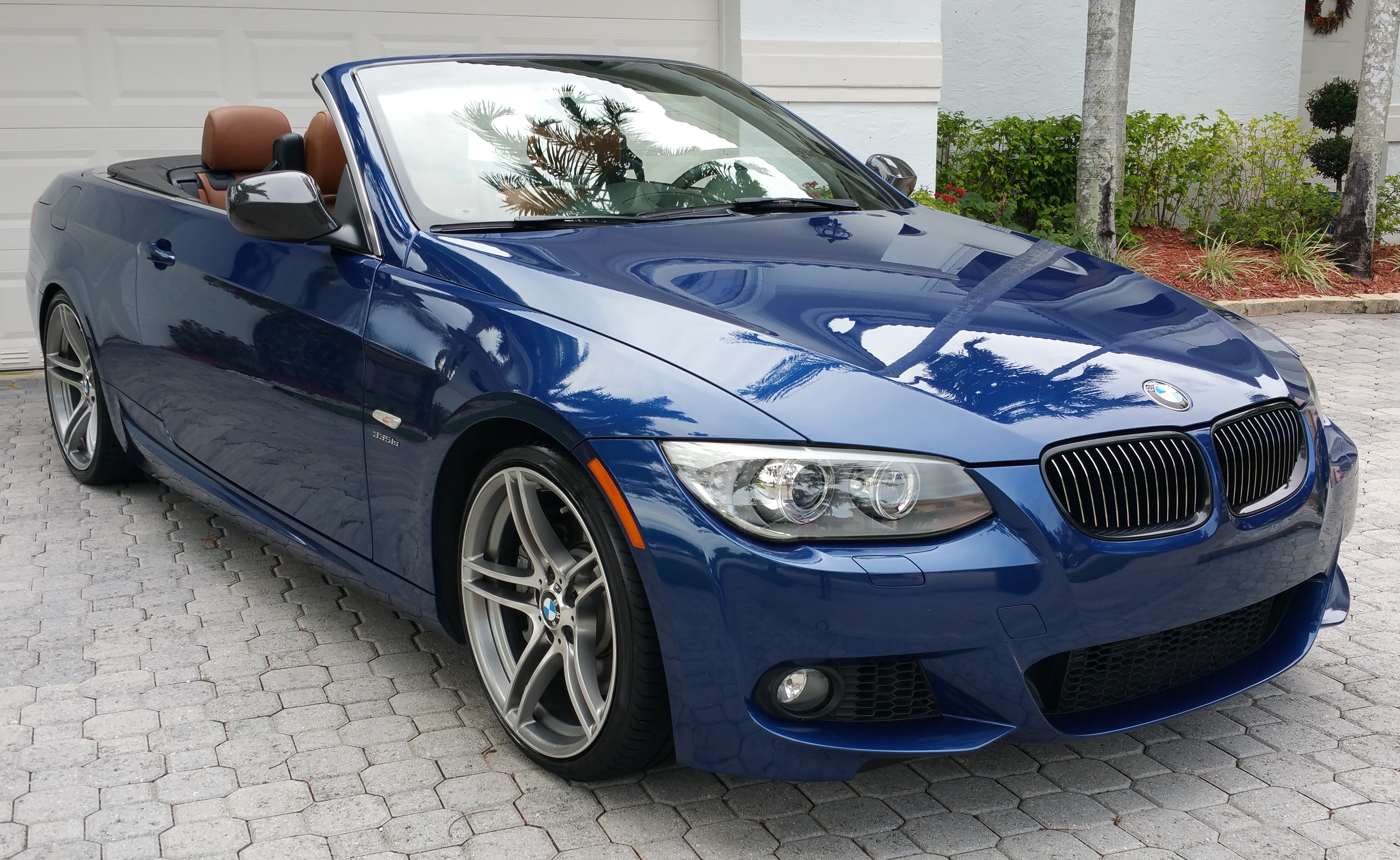
BMW 335is (E93) with roof lowered

The 335is was produced in coupé and convertible models for the North American market, with approximately 4,500 units manufactured. The 335is uses a higher performance version of the N54 engine, which increases boost from 8.7 to 11.6 psi (0.6 to 0.8 bar). This results in 239 kW (320 bhp) and 450 N⋅m (332 lb⋅ft) of torque, plus an overboost function raises torque to 370 lb⋅ft (502 N⋅m) for up to 7 seconds. The 335is was positioned between the regular 335i (which had switched from the N54 to the N55 engine for the 2011 model year, both engines rated at 224 kW (300 bhp)) and the M3 in the BMW 3 Series coupé/convertible lineup.

For the 335is the transmission options were a 7-speed double clutch transmission (DCT) with launch control (compared to the 335i that has a 6-speed Steptronic automatic), or a 6-speed manual transmission that has an upgraded clutch compared to the regular 335i. Other changes compared to the 335i include stiffer engine mounts, a higher-flow exhaust system, an upgraded cooling system, a different steering wheel, sport seats and "335is" badging on dash and in the instrument cluster. Exterior differences are larger air openings in the front bumper, a rear bumper that incorporates a diffuser-style piece, black kidney grills, and 18-inch or 19-inch "Style 313" wheels. The 335is convertible has fog lights which are omitted in the coupé.

== Model year changes ==
=== 2008 Facelift (LCI) ===
In September 2008, the facelift (LCI) versions of the saloon and estate were released for the 2009 model year. Compared to typically subtle BMW LCI changes, these changes were relatively extensive.

Mechanical changes included an increase in rear track of 24 mm (0.94 in) for some models and the N57 engine replacing the M57 for the 330d model.

Styling changes included front and rear bumpers, wing mirrors, headlights, taillights, boot lid, wider kidney grilles and revised crease lines for the bonnet. The new 2009 – 2011 facelift (LCI) AWD models became known as "xDrive" models, unlike the previous 2006–2008 (pre-lci) AWD models, which were labeled as "xi" or "xd" models. The new xDrive models received xDrive badges on the bumper and both the right and left sides right below the side marker lamps. For the interior, crash-activated head restraints were added to the front seats, the optional "Professional" navigation system was updated, iDrive was updated and the resolution of the display was increased.

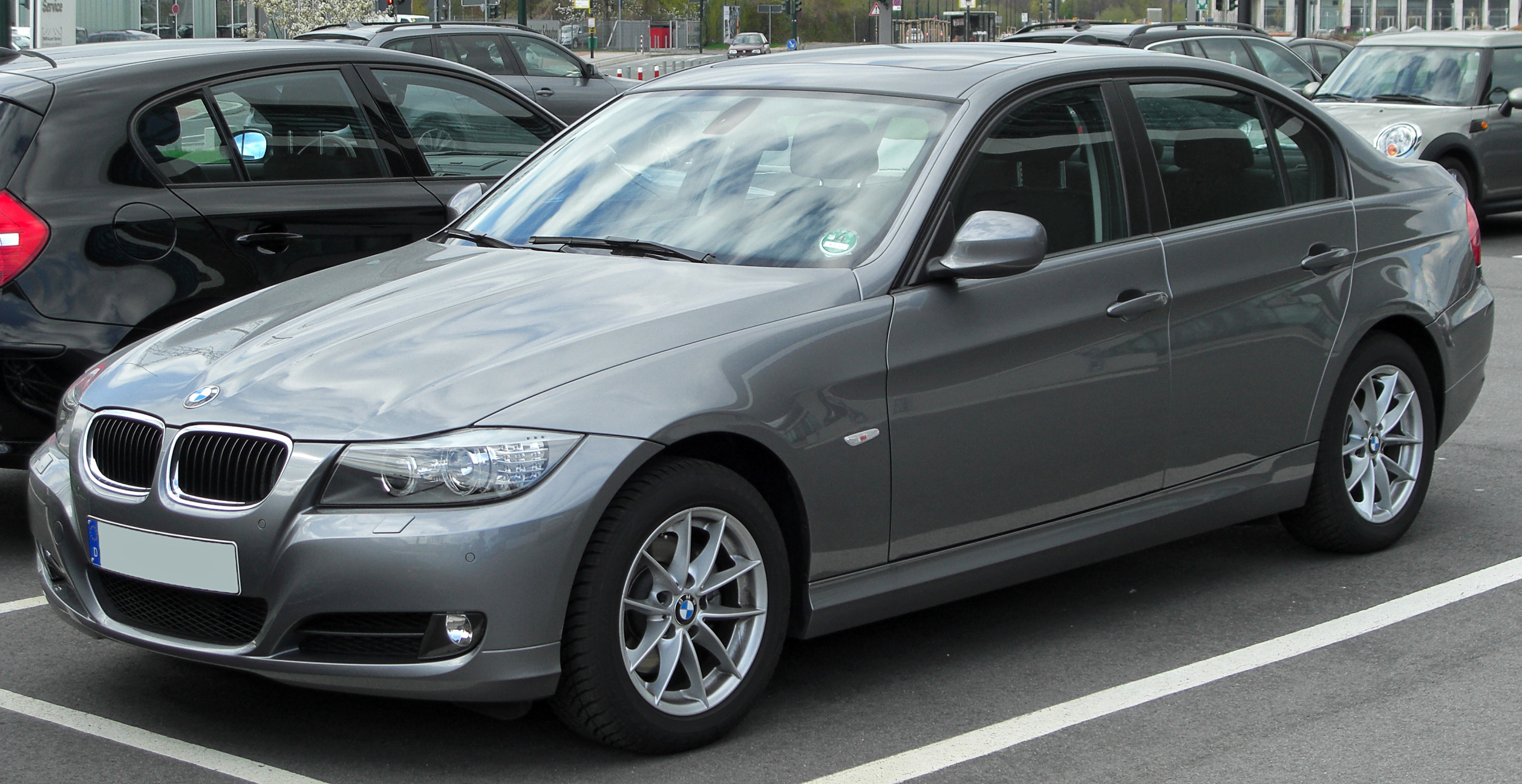
E90 saloon (facelift)

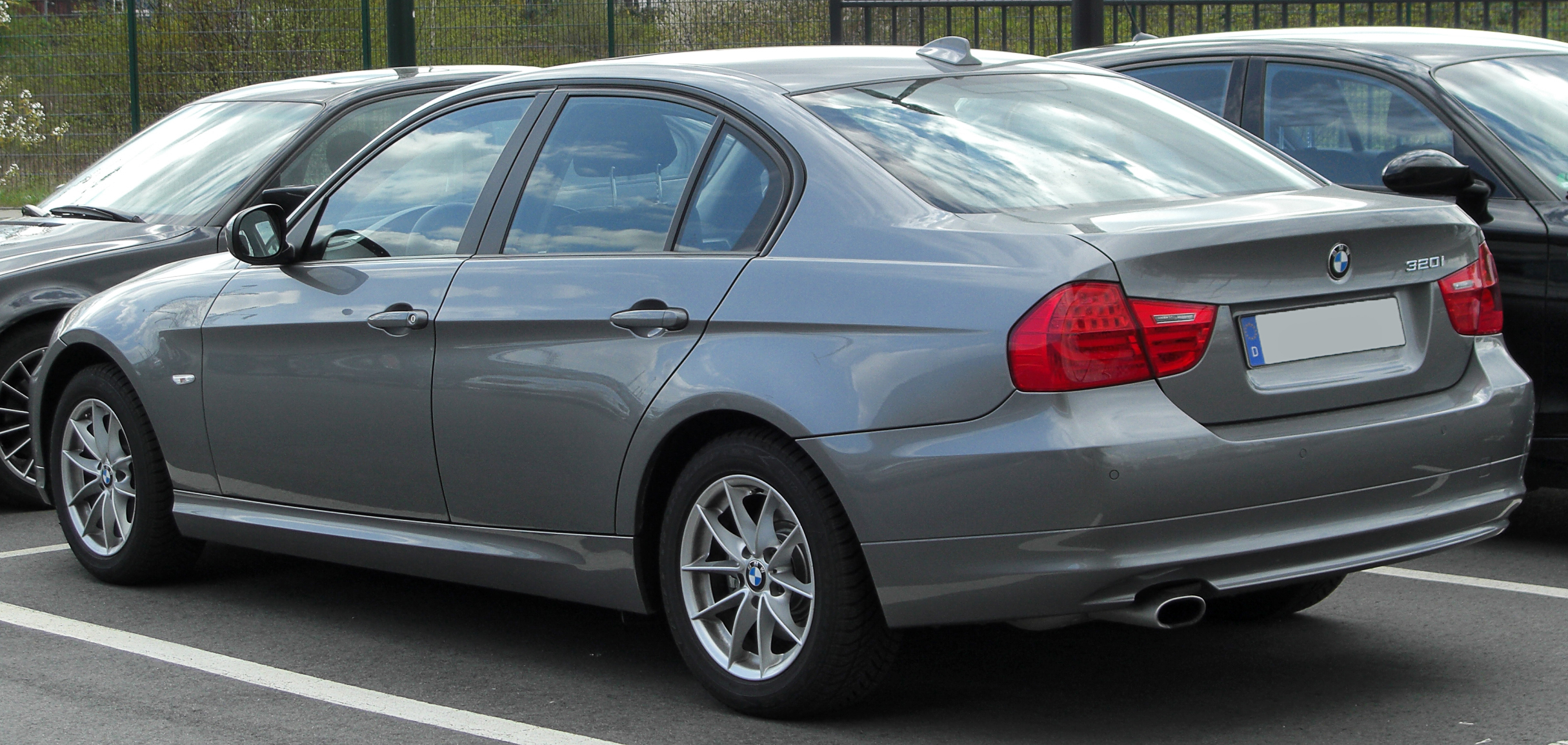
E90 saloon (facelift)

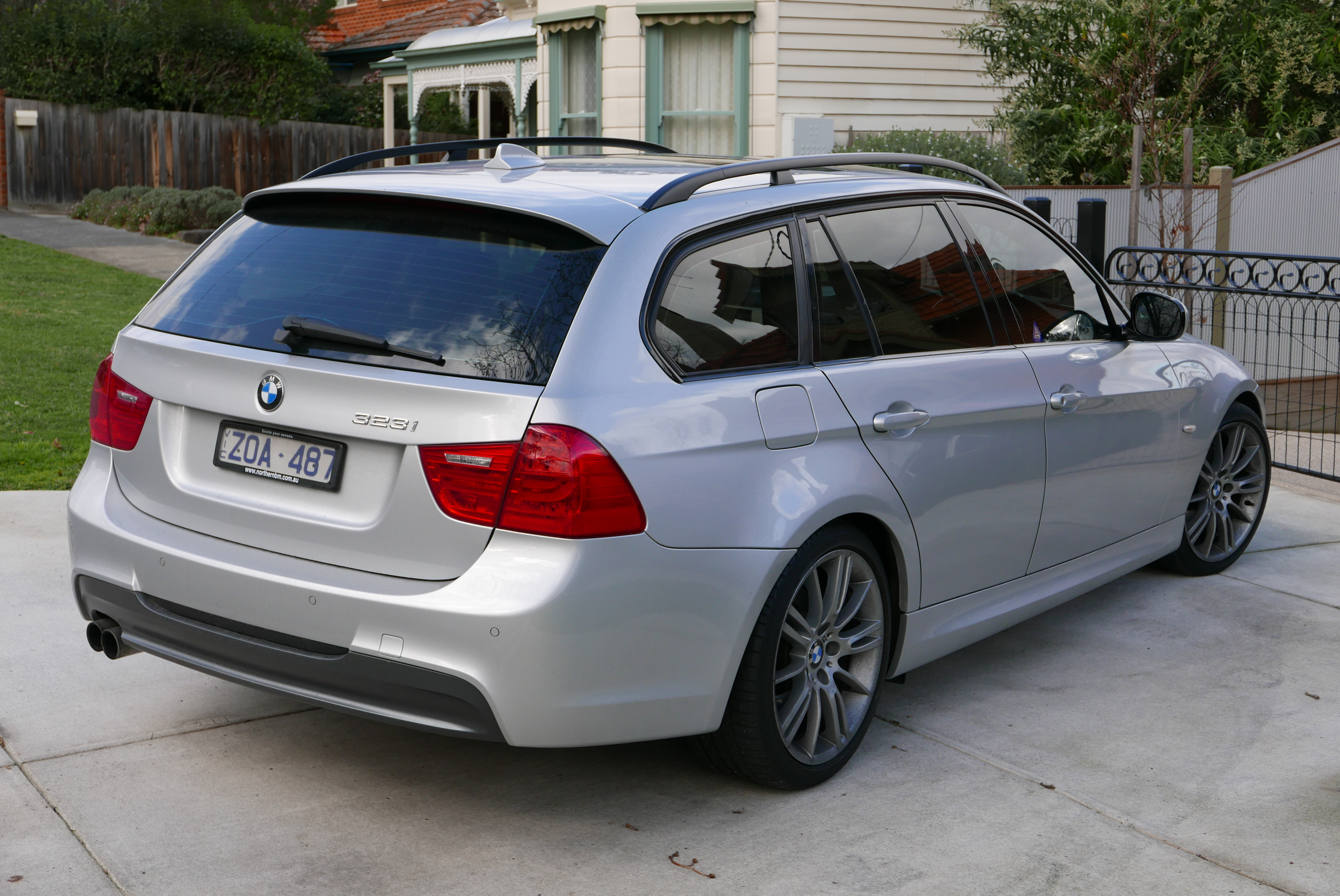
E91 Touring (facelift)

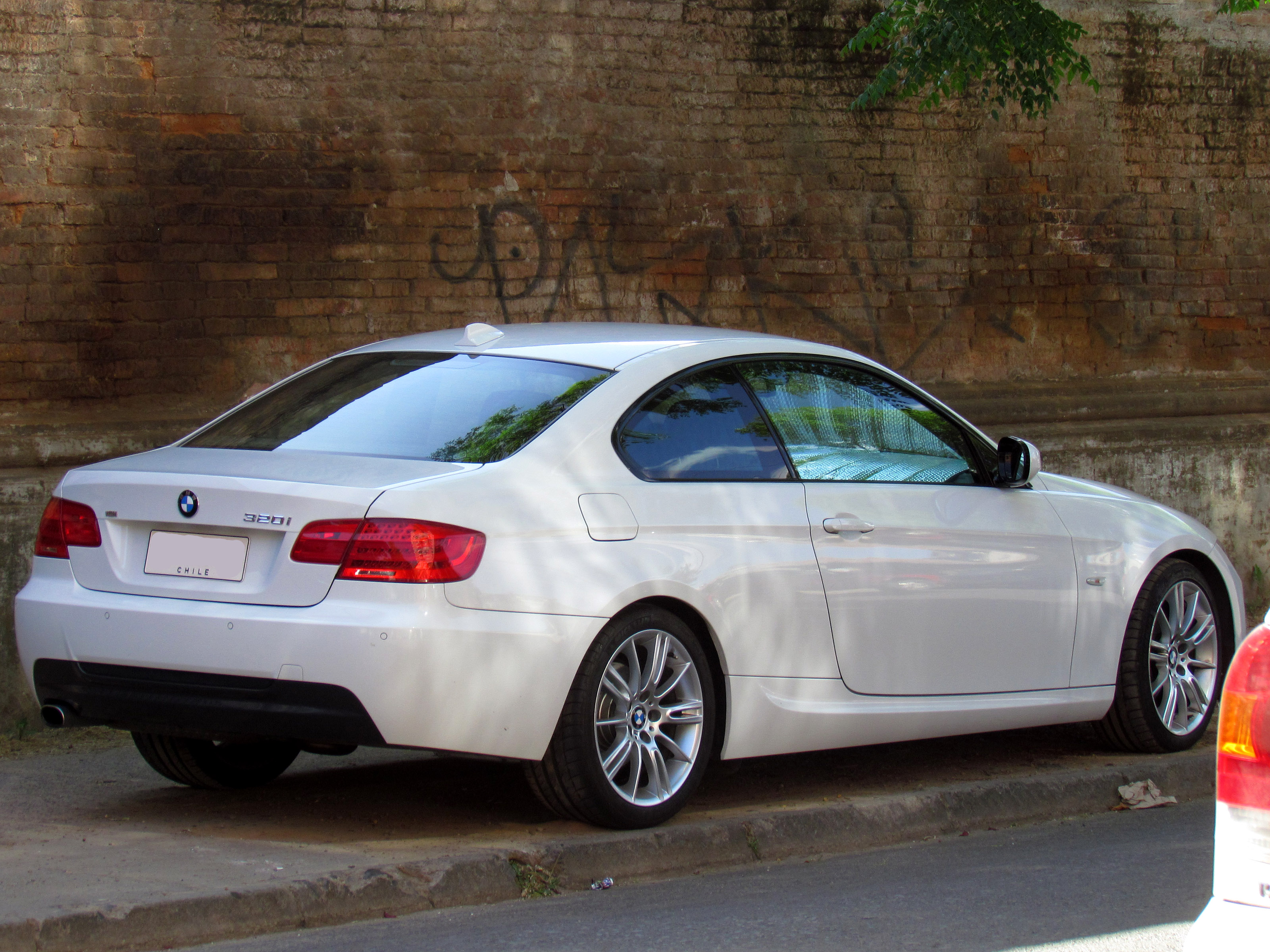
E92 coupe (facelift)

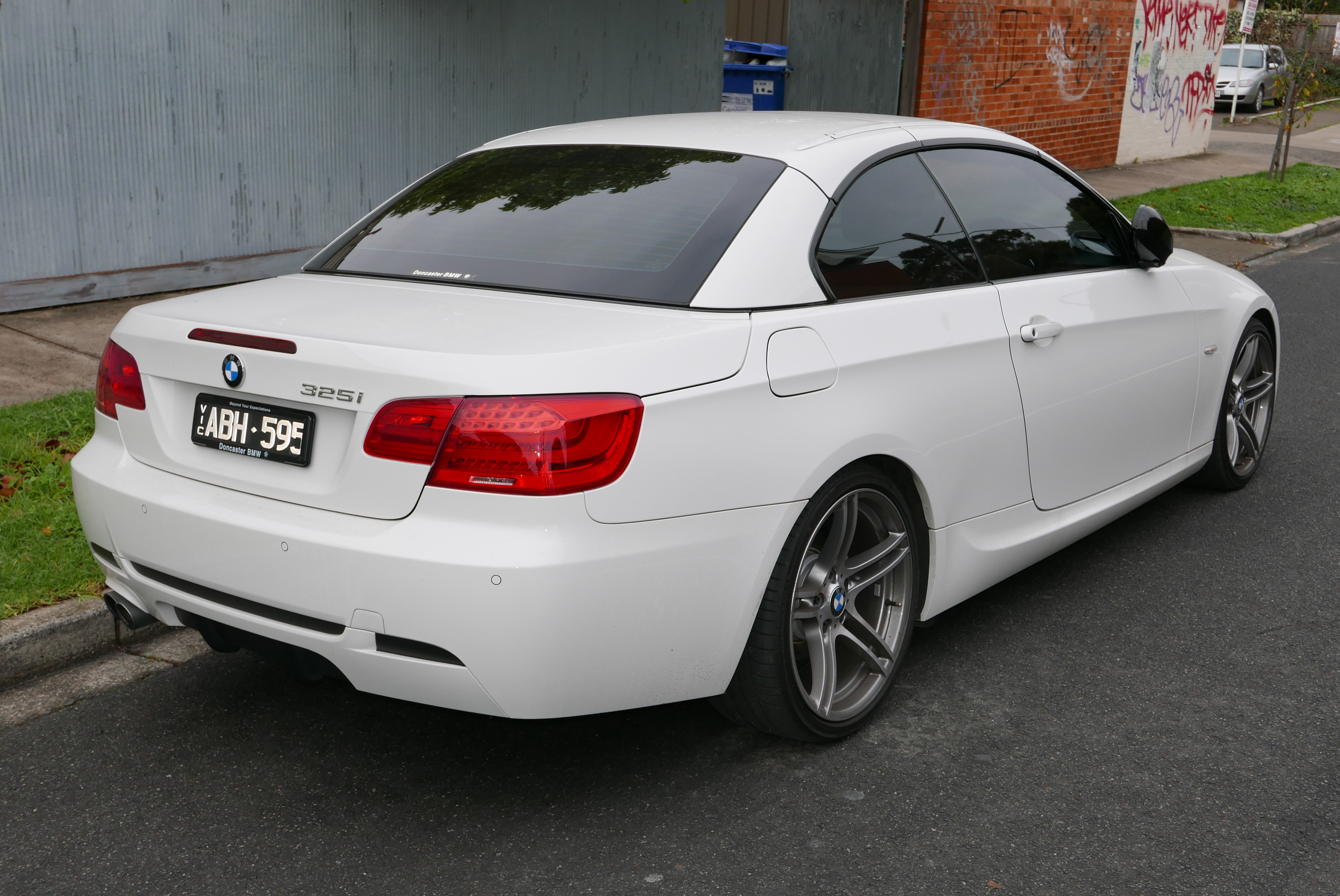
E93 convertible (facelift)

=== 2010 ===
For the 2010 model year, the Sport, Lifestyle and Exclusive Edition were introduced for saloon and estate models. The 316d estate model was added, as was the 320d EfficientDynamics Edition saloon.

Mechanical changes included compliance with the EU5 emission standard, EU6 emission compliance (optional) for the 320d and 330d models, power increases for the 318d, 320d, 325d and 330d models, the N54 engine in the 335i being replaced by N55 engine, and additional features for BMW ConnectedDrive.

== Safety ==
=== ANCAP ===
ANCAP test results* BMW 3 Series 320d sedan (2005)
Test	Score
Overall	5 /5 stars
Frontal offset	15.56/16
Side impact	15.09/16
Pole	2/2
Seat belt reminders	2/3
Whiplash protection	Not Assessed
Pedestrian protection	Poor
Electronic stability control	Standard

=== Euro NCAP ===
Euro NCAP scores
Adult Occupant:	5/5 stars
Child Occupant:	4/5 stars
Pedestrian:	1/4 stars

The Euro NCAP noted the poor pedestrian protection awarding 4 points out of 36, reporting the 3 Series was "very disappointing" in this measure.

=== IIHS ===
The Insurance Institute for Highway Safety (IIHS) gives the 3 Series a "Good" overall rating in both the frontal and side impact crash tests. The 3 Series received "Good" marks in all six of the frontal crash test categories, and "Good" marks in six of the nine categories in the side impact test. The IIHS also gave the 3 Series the Top Safety Pick award. The convertible is rated "Marginal" in side impacts, making the 3 Series convertible the lowest rated vehicle currently sold in its class in IIHS tests.

2008 saloon NHTSA scores
Frontal Driver:	4/5 stars
Frontal Passenger:	4/5 stars
Side Rear Driver:	5/5 stars
Side Rear Passenger:	5/5 stars
Rollover:	4/5 stars

=== Recalls ===
In November 2017, BMW recalled 672,000 3 Series cars from model years 2006–11 with climate control system electronic components at risk of overheating, due to faulty blower motor wiring.

== Production ==
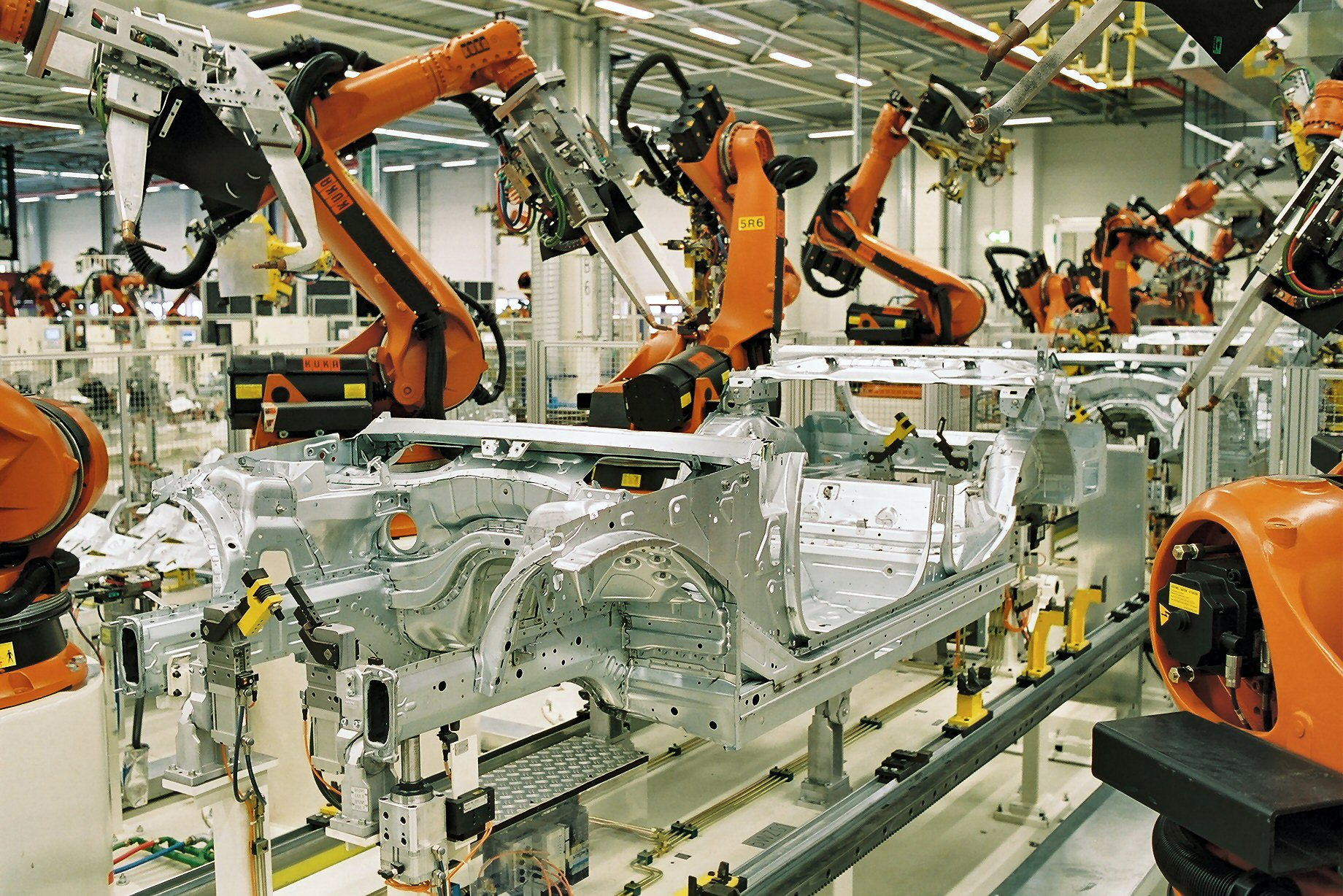
BMW plant in Leipzig, Germany: Spot welding of BMW 3 series car bodies with KUKA industrial robots.

In 2002, Norbert Reithofer and Development Chief Burkhard Goeschel started an initiative to halve the time it took to reach full production of the next generation 3 Series from six months to three.

The E90 was produced in Germany (Leipzig, Munich and Regensburg) and in South Africa (Rosslyn). Local assembly of complete knock-down (CKD) kits were used for cars sold in China, Egypt, India, Indonesia, Malaysia, Mexico, Thailand and Russia.

The production dates for each body style are as follows:

- Saloon (E90): December 2004 – October 2011
- Estate (E91): September 2005 – May 2012
- Coupé (E92): June 2006 – June 2013
- Convertible (E93): December 2006 – October 2013

== Sales ==
First marketed in March 2005, the car quickly became BMW Group's best-selling car worldwide, and by the end of the year 229,900 vehicles had been delivered.

The BMW E90 series was the best-selling luxury car in Canada and the United States. The 2006 E90 marked the 15th consecutive year that the 3 Series was named on Car and Driver's 10Best.

Units sold according to BMW's annual reports:

Year	Total	Saloon E90	Estate E91	Coupé E92	Convertible E93	Notes
2005	256,981	229,932	27,049	-	-	Saloon launched in March, estate introduced in September.
2006	463,820	336,232	105,483	22,105	-	Coupé introduced in September.
2007	555,135	310,194	102,399	89,572	52,970	Convertible launched in March.
2008	474,208	246,231	93,191	79,248	55,538	
2009	397,103	219,850	84,601	54,852	37,800	
2010	399,009	242,831	74,008	46,358	35,812	
2011	384,464	240,279	72,054	39,332	32,799	
2012	112,707	-	59,144	29,525	24,038	F30 Saloon launched.
2013	32,658	-	-	15,240	17,418	F30 Touring launched in autumn 2012.
Total	3,076,085	1,825,549	617,929	376,232	256,375	

== Motorsports ==
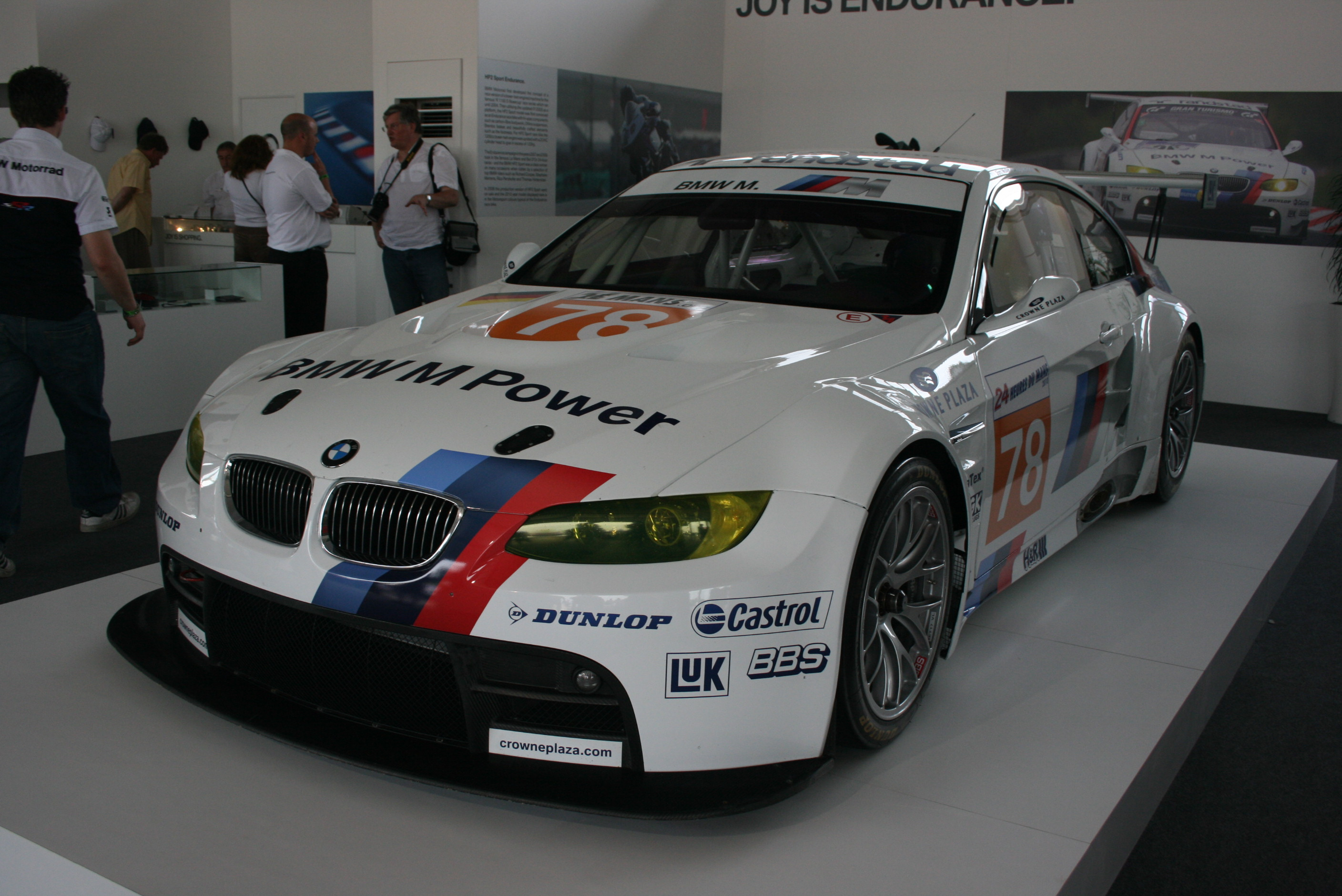
BMW M3 GT2

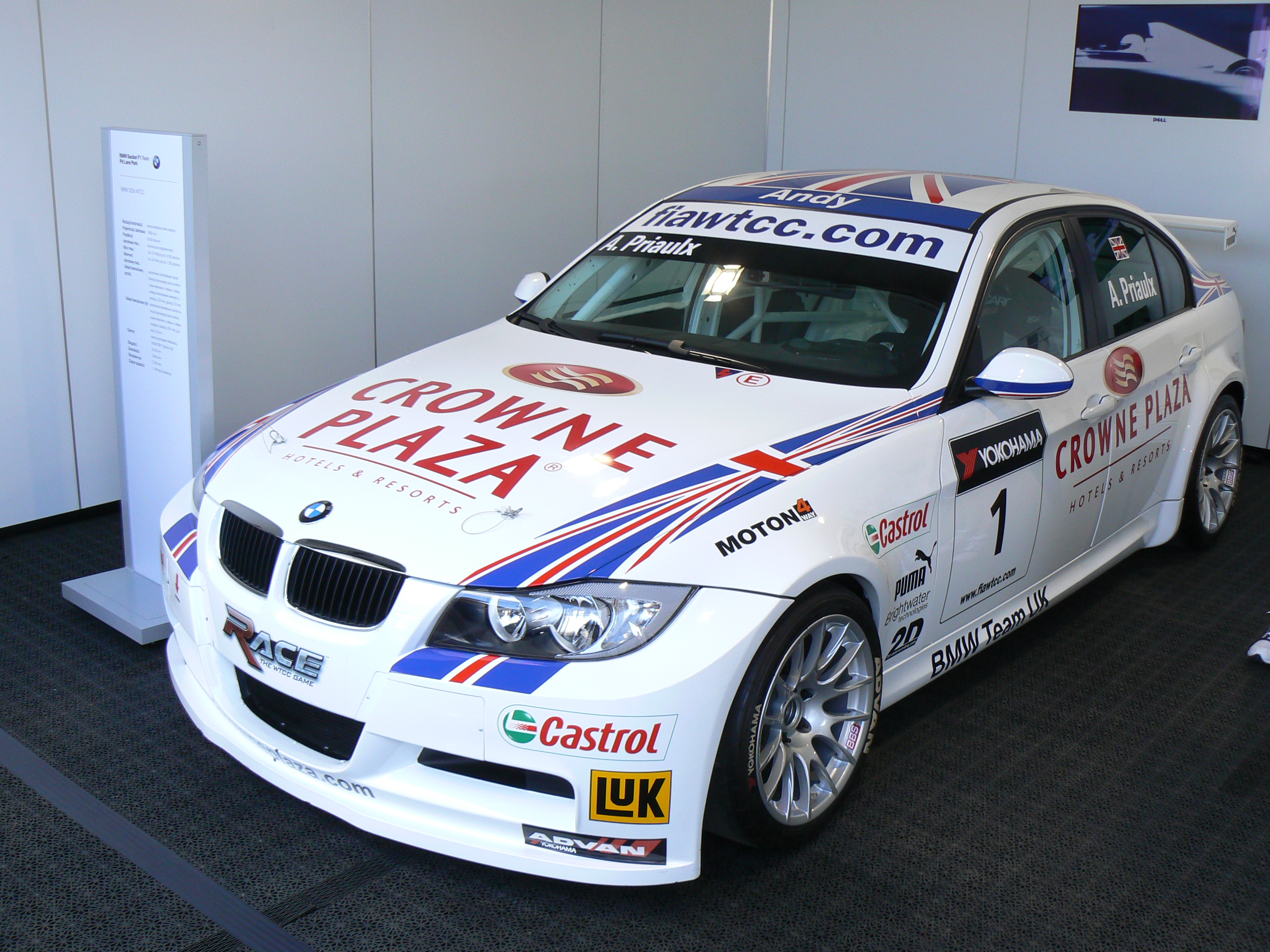
E90 320si WTCC car driven by Andy Priaulx

BMW WTCC works driver Andy Priaulx won the 2006 and 2007 World Touring Car Championships in the 320si E90, and four other drivers achieved over 35 wins in the championship.

The E90 320si was used by several teams in the British Touring Car Championship (BTCC). The 2009 BTCC Drivers Championship was won by Colin Turkington using the E90 320si.

The transmission is 5-speed H-pattern manual, while the 6-speed sequential was optional. In 2010, some WTCC drivers used a 6-speed sequential, while the other WTCC drivers had an optional 5-speed h-pattern manual gearbox.

The E92 Art Car entered the 2010 24 Hours of Le Mans race, with Andy Priaulx (GB), Dirk Müller (DE) and Dirk Werner (DE) driving the number 79 car which failed to complete the race.

== Awards ==
- BBC's Top Gear Awards named the E90 as the "Ugliest Car of the Year 2005", describing it as "just 14 foot of car".
- In April 2006, the E90 was awarded the World Car of the Year title. The car was praised for its balance between performance and practicality, as well as between style and seriousness. The jury also praised the new diesel engines and the all-wheel-drive variants.
- Car and Driver magazine listed the E90 on their Ten Best list eight consecutive times between 2006 and 2013.
- The E90 was named "Best New Sports Sedan" in the 2006 Canadian Car of the Year awards.
- It was Japan's Import Car of the Year for 2005–06.
- The British motoring magazine What Car? awarded it Car of the Year 2006. From 2006 to 2011, they also awarded it Compact Executive of the Year.
- In April 2011, the E90 335d saloon won the 2011 Diesel Car of the Year award, an honour bestowed by The Diesel Driver magazine's readers, receiving 29,6% of the vote.
- The British motoring magazine What Car? awarded the BMW 320d EfficientDynamics Auto the Overall Winner Green Car of the Year 2012. The 320d model has a UK combined fuel economy of 56 mpg and CO_{2} emissions of 110g/km.
