= BMW N43 =

BMW N43 engine
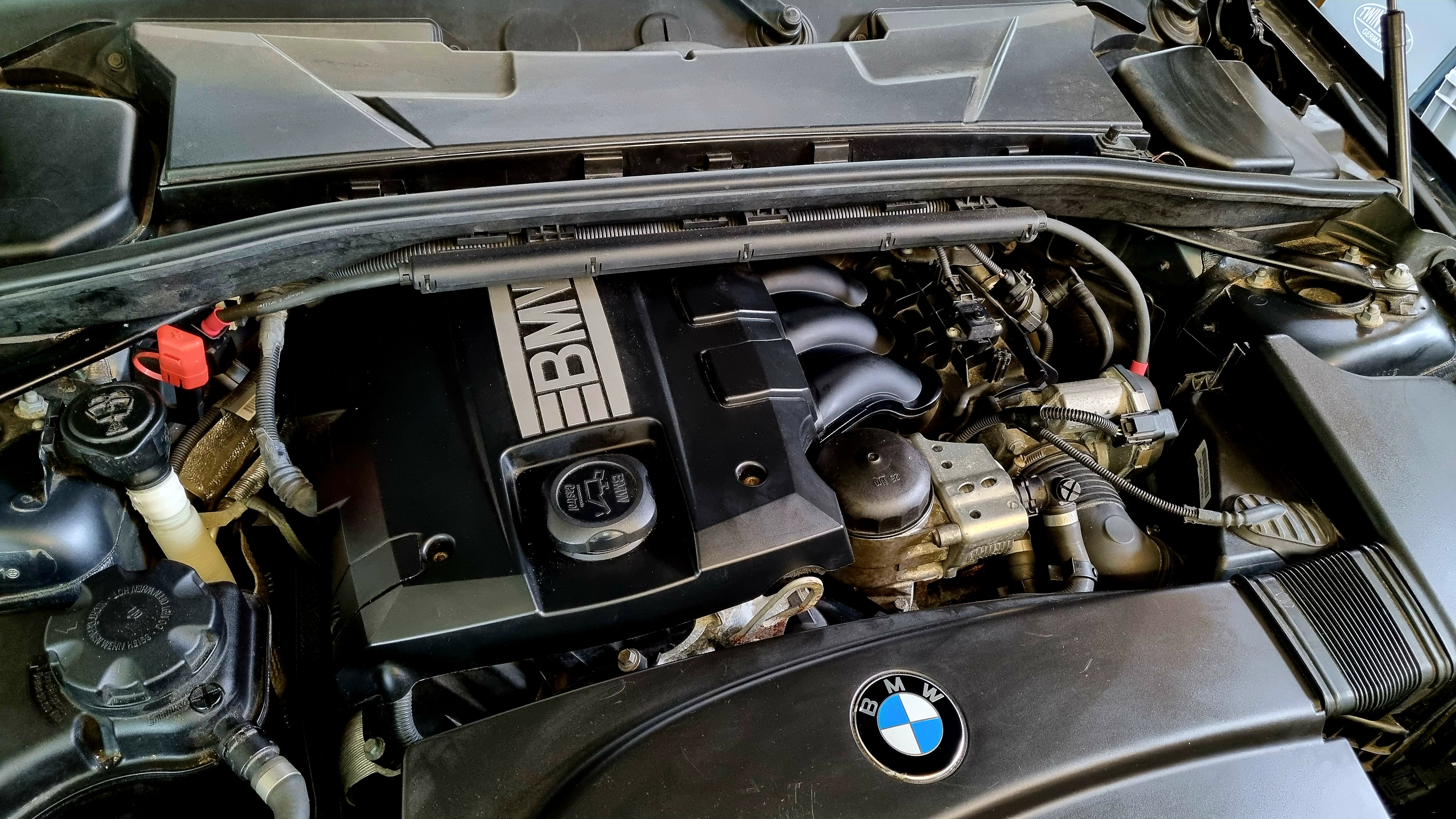

Overview
- Production: 2007-2011

Layout
- Configuration: Inline-4
- Displacement: 1.6 L (1,599 cc); 2.0 L (1,995 cc)
- Cylinder bore: 82 mm (3.23 in); 84 mm (3.31 in)
- Piston stroke: 75.7 mm (2.98 in); 90 mm (3.54 in)
- Cylinder block material: Aluminium
- Cylinder head material: Aluminium
- Valvetrain: DOHC, with VVT

Combustion
- Fuel type: Petrol

Chronology
- Predecessor: BMW N46/N45
- Successor: BMW N13

The BMW N43 is a naturally aspirated four-cylinder petrol engine which was sold from 2006 to 2013. It replaced both the BMW N46 and BMW N45 engines. However the N43 was not sold in countries with high sulfur fuel, therefore the N45/N46 engines remained in production alongside the N43.

Compared with its N46 predecessor, the N43 features direct injection.

In 2011, as part of BMW's shift to turbocharging, the N43 was replaced by the BMW N13 turbocharged four-cylinder engine. The N43 suffered various problems in service - breakage of the cam chain plastic guides leading to oil starvation as the debris blocked the oil strainer, and problems with the injectors, coil packs and the NOx sensor.

== Versions ==
Version	Displacement	Power	Torque	Year
N43B16	1,599 cc (97.6 cu in)	90 kW (121 bhp) at 6,000 rpm	160 N⋅m (118 lb⋅ft) at 4,250 rpm	2008-2011
N43B20	1,995 cc (121.7 cu in)	90 kW (121 bhp) at 6,000 rpm	185 N⋅m (136 lb⋅ft) at 3,000 rpm	2007-2011
N43B20	1,995 cc (121.7 cu in)	105 kW (141 bhp) at 6,000 rpm	190 N⋅m (140 lb⋅ft) at 4,500 rpm	2007-2011
N43B20	1,995 cc (121.7 cu in)	125 kW (168 bhp) at 6,700 rpm	210 N⋅m (155 lb⋅ft) at 4,250 rpm	2007-2011

=== N43B16 ===
The N43B16 has a displacement of 1,599 cc (97.6 cu in) and produces 90 kW (121 bhp) and 160 N⋅m (118 lb⋅ft). It is the successor to the BMW N45 engine and, as per the N45, does not have Valvetronic.

Applications:

- 2007-2009 E87 116i
- 2008 E90 316i

=== N43B20 ===
The N43B20 has a displacement of 1,995 cc (121.7 cu in) and produces up to 125 kW (168 bhp) and 210 N⋅m (155 lb⋅ft).

In 2009, the 1,995 cc (121.7 cu in) N43B20 replaced the 1,599 cc (97.6 cu in) N43B16 in the 116i and 316i. Power remained at 90 kW (121 bhp), however torque was increased.

Applications: 90 kW (121 bhp) version

- 2007-2011 E81/E87 116i
- 2009-2011 E90/E91 316i

105 kW (141 bhp) version

- 2007-2011 E90/E91/E92/E93 318i
- 2008-2011 E81/E87/E88 118i

125 kW (168 bhp) version

- 2007-2011 E81/E82/E87/E88 120i
- 2007-2011 E90/E91/E92/E93 320i
- 2007-2009 E60/E61 520i

== See also ==
- BMW
- List of BMW engines
