= BMW 3 Series (F30) =

Sixth generation of BMW 3 Series

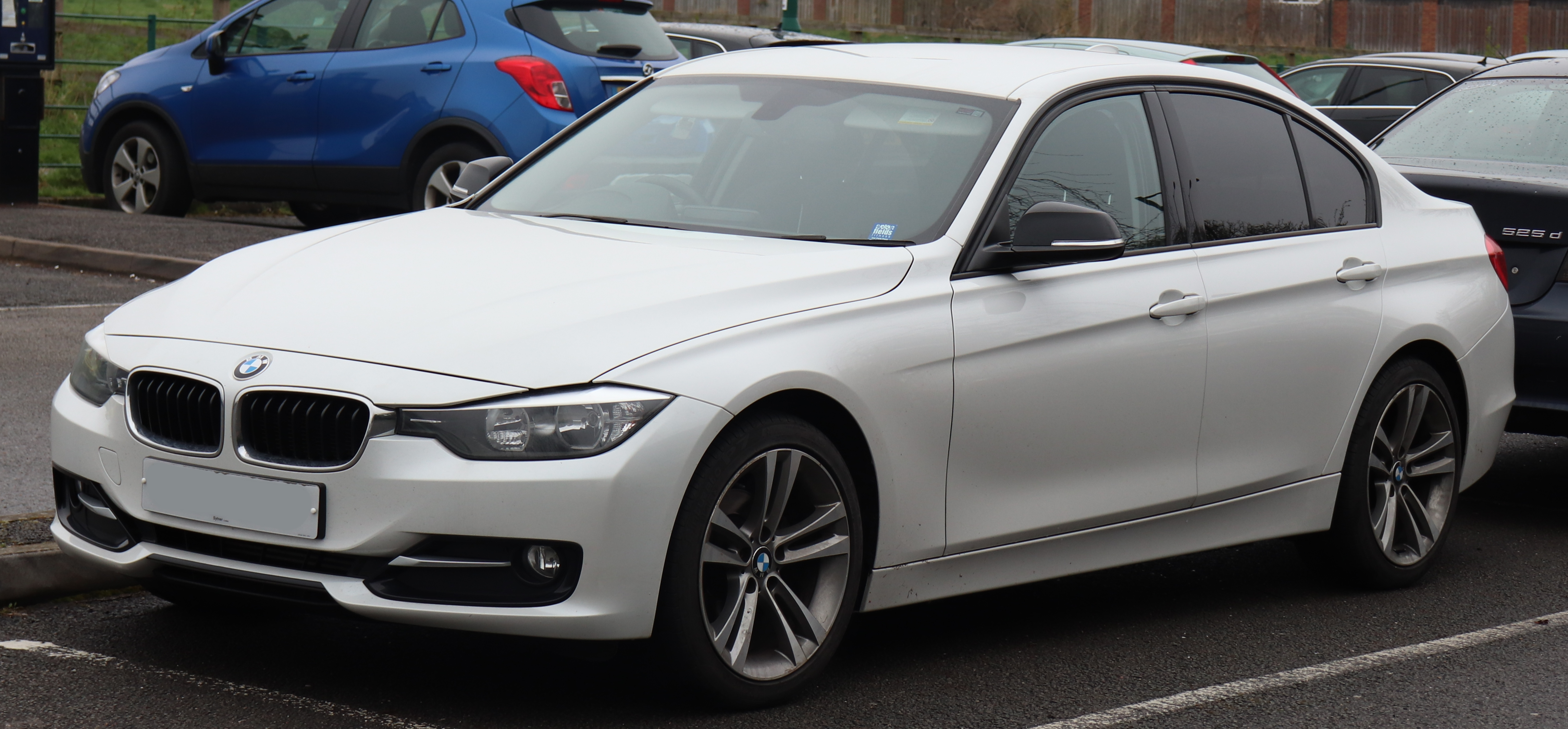
- 2012 BMW 318d (F30; pre-facelift)

Overview
- Manufacturer: BMW
- Model code: F30 (sedan); F31 (touring); F34 (Gran Turismo); F35 (long-wheelbase sedan)
- Production: October 2011 – October 2018
- Model years: 2012–2018
- Assembly: Germany: Regensburg; Dingolfing; South Africa: Rosslyn (BMW SA); China: Tiexi, Shenyang (BBA); India: Chennai (BMW India); Brazil: Araquari (BMW Group Brazil); Russia: Kaliningrad (Avtotor); Thailand: Rayong (BMW Thailand); Indonesia: Jakarta (Gaya Motor); Malaysia: Kulim, Kedah (Inokom); Egypt: 6th of October City (BAG)
- Designer: Christopher Weil (2009); Michael de Bono (F31, 2009); Page Beermann (F34, 2009)

Body and chassis
- Class: Compact executive car (D)
- Body style: 4-door sedan (F30/F35); 5-door wagon (F31); 5-door fastback (F34)
- Layout: Front-engine, rear-wheel-drive; Front-engine, all-wheel-drive (xDrive)
- Platform: BMW L7
- Related: BMW M3 (F80); BMW 1 Series (F20); BMW 4 Series (F32); BMW 2 Series (F22)

Powertrain
- Engine: Petrol: 1.5 L B38 I3 turbo; 1.6 L N13 I4 turbo; 2.0 L N20 I4 turbo; 2.0 L B48 I4 turbo; 3.0 L N55 I6 turbo; 3.0 L S55 I6 turbo; 3.0 L B58 I6 turbo; Diesel: 2.0 L N47 I4 turbo; 2.0 L B47 I4 turbo; 3.0 L N57 I6 turbo
- Transmission: 6-speed manual; 8-speed ZF 8HP automatic

Dimensions
- Wheelbase: 2,810 mm (110.6 in) (F30/31); 2,920 mm (115.0 in) (F34/35)
- Length: 4,624–4,643 mm (182.0–182.8 in) (F30/31); 4,734 mm (186.4 in) (F35); 4,824 mm (189.9 in) (F34)
- Width: 1,811 mm (71.3 in); 1,828 mm (72.0 in) (F34)
- Height: 1,429–1,434 mm (56.3–56.5 in) (F30/31); 1,455 mm (57.3 in) (F35); 1,508 mm (59.4 in) (F34)
- Curb weight: 1,385–1,769 kg (3,053.4–3,900.0 lb) (F30, including hybrid models); 1,465–1,767 kg (3,229.8–3,895.6 lb) (F31); 1,540–1,650 kg (3,395.1–3,637.6 lb) (F35); 1,540–1,780 kg (3,395.1–3,924.2 lb) (F34)

Chronology
- Predecessor: BMW 3 Series (E90)
- Successor: BMW 3 Series (G20); BMW 4 Series (G26) Gran Coupé (F34)

The sixth generation of the BMW 3 Series consists of the BMW F30 (sedan version), BMW F31 (wagon version, marketed as 'Touring') and BMW F34 (fastback version, marketed as 'Gran Turismo') compact executive cars. The F30/F31/F34 generation was produced from October 2011 to 2019 and is often collectively referred to as the F30.

For the sixth generation, the coupé and convertible models were spun off to create the new BMW 4 Series nameplate. BMW also introduced a separate hatchback model under the 3 Series nameplate called the 3 Series Gran Turismo (F34), similar to the 5 Series Gran Turismo.

The F30 is the first generation of the 3 Series to be powered by a range of turbocharged engines exclusively and electric power steering (replacing the hydraulic power steering systems used previously). The F30 also marked the 3 Series' first use of a three-cylinder engine in its 2015 facelift. A new plug-in hybrid F30 model was also introduced in 2016. A long-wheelbase sedan version (model code F35) was sold in China.

The M3 model (designated F80) was introduced in 2014 and is powered by the S55 twin-turbocharged straight-six engine.

In March 2019, the BMW 3 Series (G20) was released as the successor to the F30. The F34 Gran Turismo fastback model continued to be available until early 2020, and was replaced by the BMW 4 Series Gran Coupé (G26) in June 2021.

== Development and launch ==
The exterior designer for the F30 sedan was Christopher Weil and exterior designer for the F31 Touring was Michael de Bono.

The F30 was unveiled in Munich on 14 October 2011, with market launch and first customer deliveries on 11 February 2012.

== Body styles ==
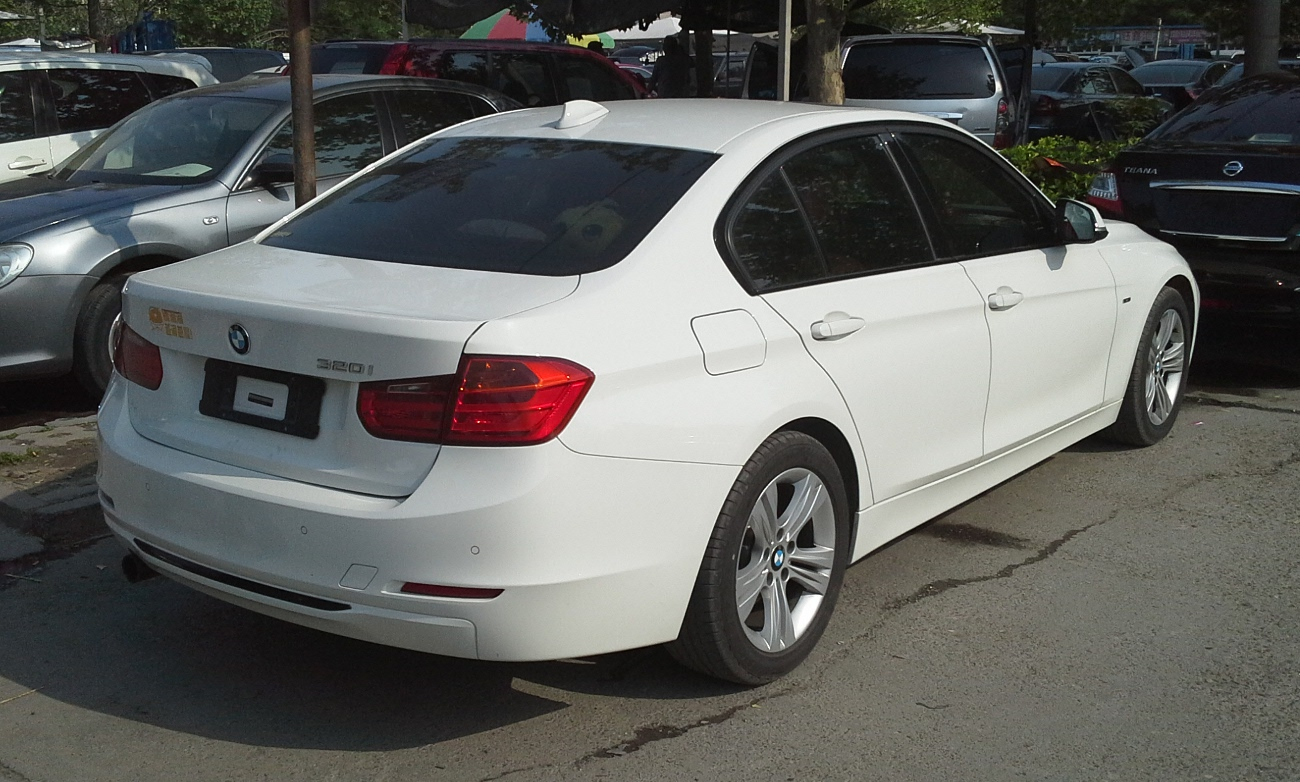
Sedan (F30)

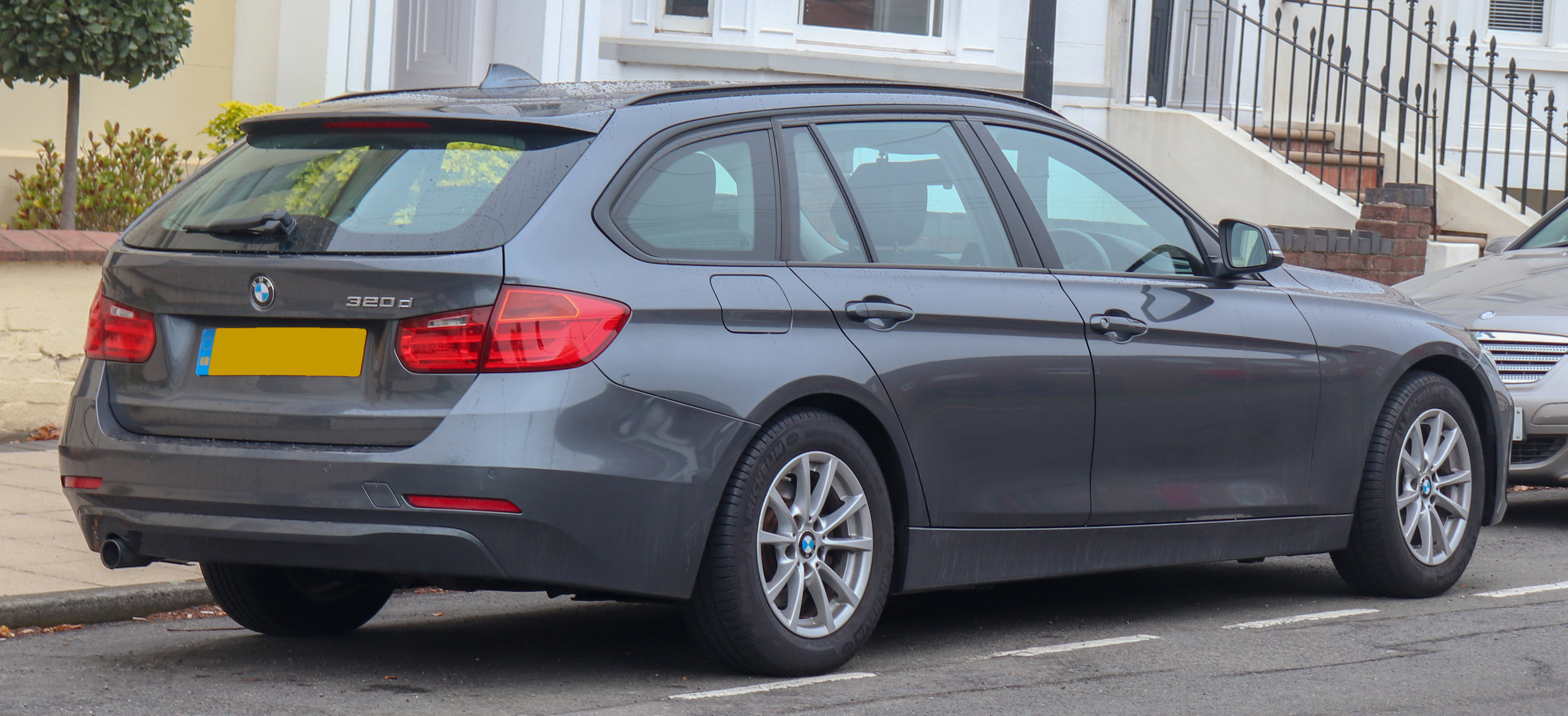
Wagon (F31)

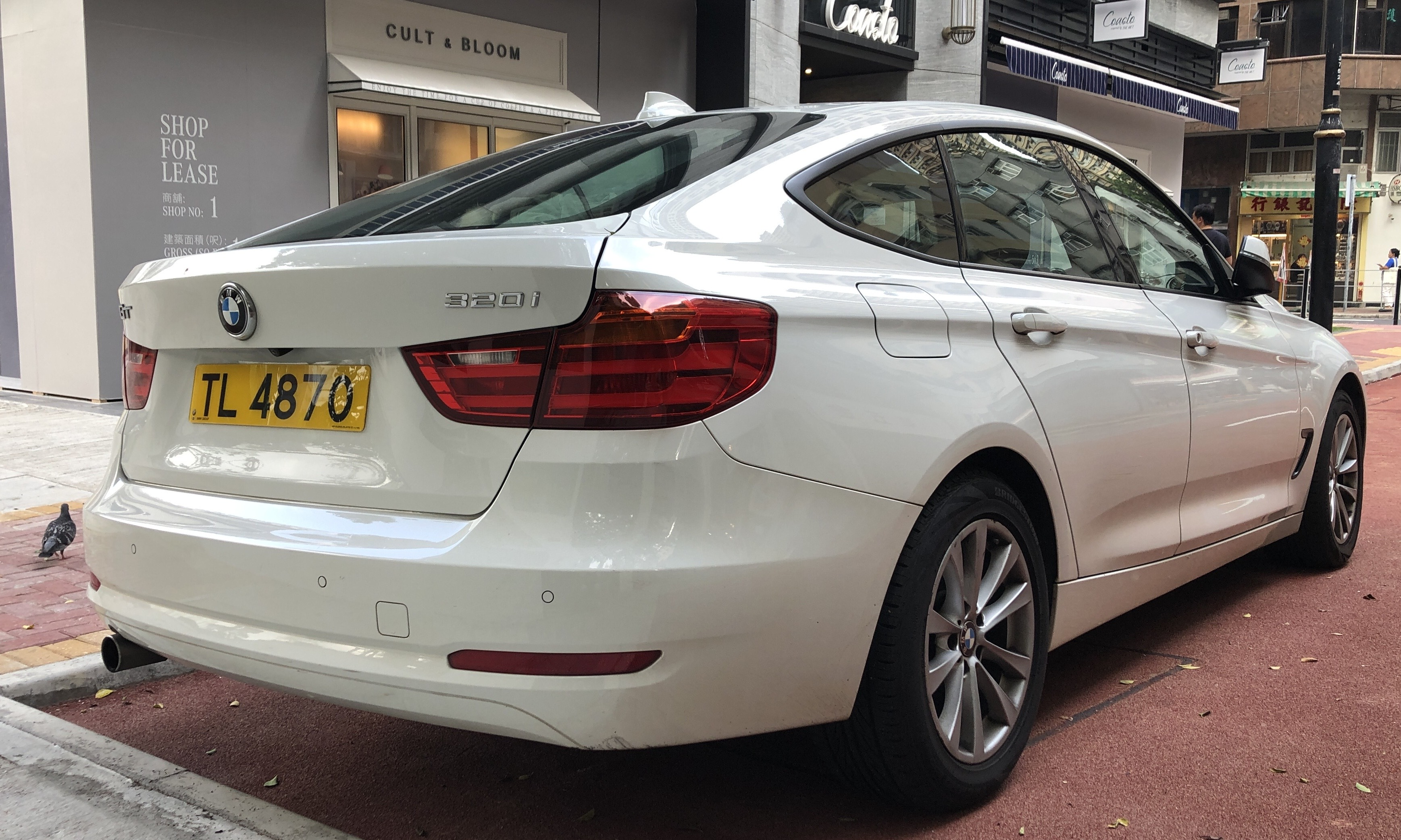
Gran Turismo (F34)

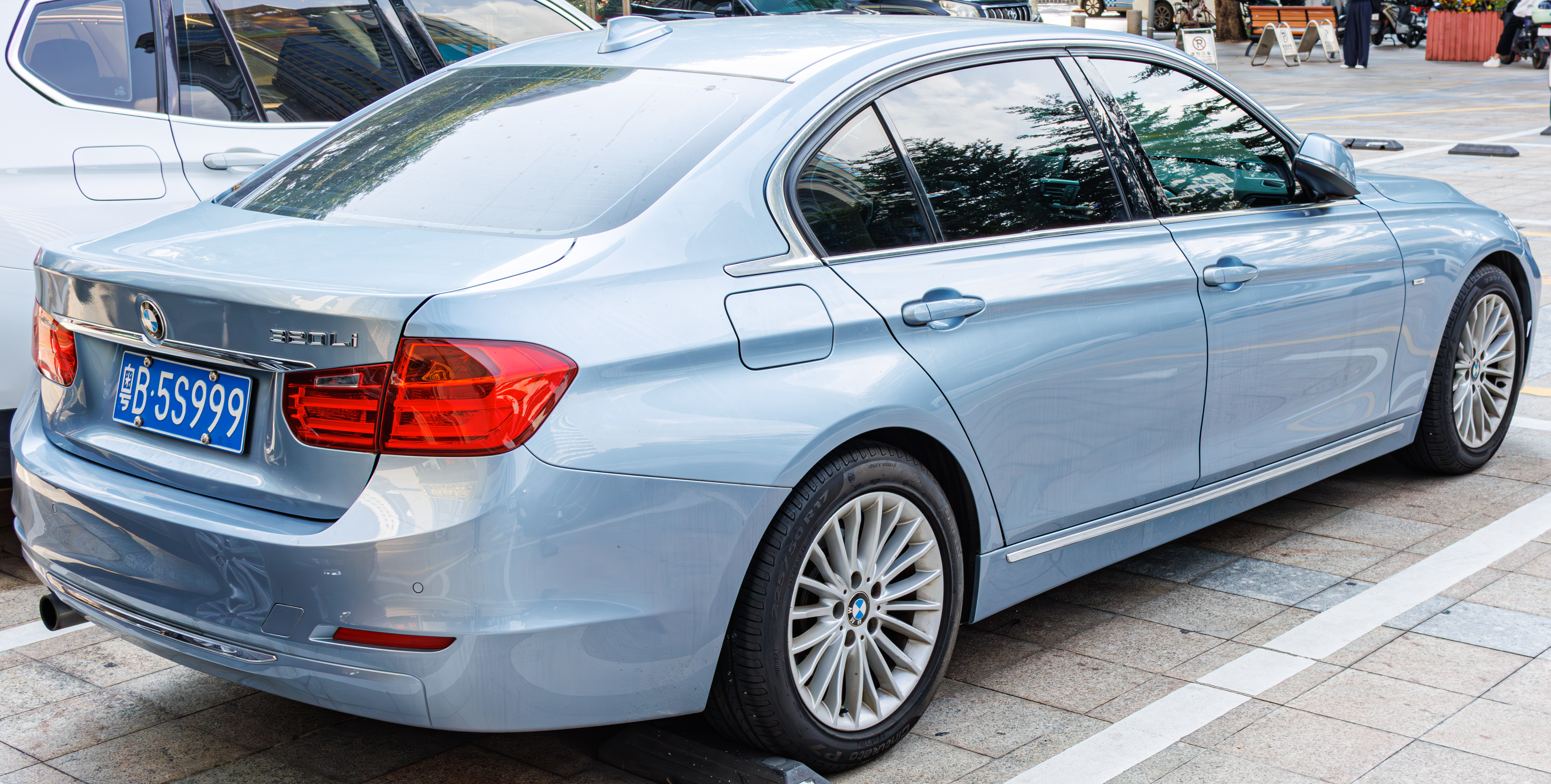
LWB sedan (F35)

=== Sedan (F30) ===
The F30 sedan debuted at the 2012 Geneva Motor Show in March 2012 and was the first of the sixth generation 3 Series models to go on sale. Early models included the 328i and 335i and (post LCI) later models included the 330i and 340i. The 320i, 318d, and 316d models were added to the F30 range in March 2012. The 320i EfficientDynamics Edition and 316i were added in autumn of 2012.

In the United States, the arrival of the four-cylinder models marked the first time a 3 Series was sold with a four-cylinder petrol engine, since the E36 318i of the late 1990s. The 328i xDrive and 335i xDrive went on sale in the summer of 2012.

=== Touring (F31) ===
The wagon/estate body style (marketed as "Touring") was unveiled at the 21st Auto Mobil International held at Leipzig in 2012. This body style has a designation of F31, and the launch models consisted of the 328i, 320d and the 330d. The 320i, 316d and 318d models were added in autumn of 2012.

=== Gran Turismo (F34) ===
The 5-door fastback body style has a designation of F34 and is marketed as the 3 Series Gran Turismo, with styling similar to the 5 Series Gran Turismo. The Gran Turismo body style was discontinued in 2020 for the following generation, the G20 3 Series, as it proved to be unsuccessful in terms of sales. It was effectively replaced with the 4 Series Gran Coupe.

At 4,824 mm (189.9 in), the F34 is 200 mm (7.9 in) longer than the sedan and Touring models. This extra length is partly facilitated by the 110 mm (4.3 in) longer wheelbase shared with the F35 long wheelbase sedan models. The F34 is also 79 mm (3.1 in) taller than the F30/F31. These increased dimensions result in the rear wheels being located further back and lower with respect to the rear seat, and allows for three full-size rear seats.

The F34 version was unveiled at the 83rd Geneva International Motor Show in March 2013. At launch, the engine range consisted of turbocharged petrol and diesel engines in straight-4 and straight-6 configurations. All-wheel drive was available in the "i xDrive" and "d xDrive" models. The F34 received a facelift ("Life Cycle Impulse") in mid-2016, a year after the facelift was introduced for the other body styles of the F30 generation.

=== LWB sedan (F35) ===
A long-wheelbase sedan model having a designation of F35, was produced for the Chinese market. The wheelbase is increased by 110 mm (4.3 in) to 2,920 mm (115.0 in); this increases rear knee room by 90 mm (3.5 in) and results in an overall length of 4,734 mm (186.4 in). The vehicle was produced in BMW's Shenyang production plant, and has chrome trim on the doors to distinguish it from the regular F30 sedans.

The F35 was unveiled at 2012 Auto China in Beijing. Initial models included the 320Li, 328Li and 335Li. Post-facelift (LCI) models consisted of the 316Li, 320Li, 328Li, 328Li xDrive and 335Li.

== Exterior styling ==
The F30/F31 has grown in all dimensions compared to its predecessor. The styling is similar to previous generations with a sweeping bonnet, short front overhang, and long wheelbase. Headlamps now connect to a wide kidney grille. Tail lamps also sport a wide "L" shape design seen in many BMW models.

In some markets, in addition to the base and M Sport models, three 'trim lines' were available for this generation: Modern Line, Sport Line and Luxury Line. These lines form the base packages upon which extra options could be specified. The Modern Line was discontinued after the 2014 model year, due to low sales.

Luxury Line

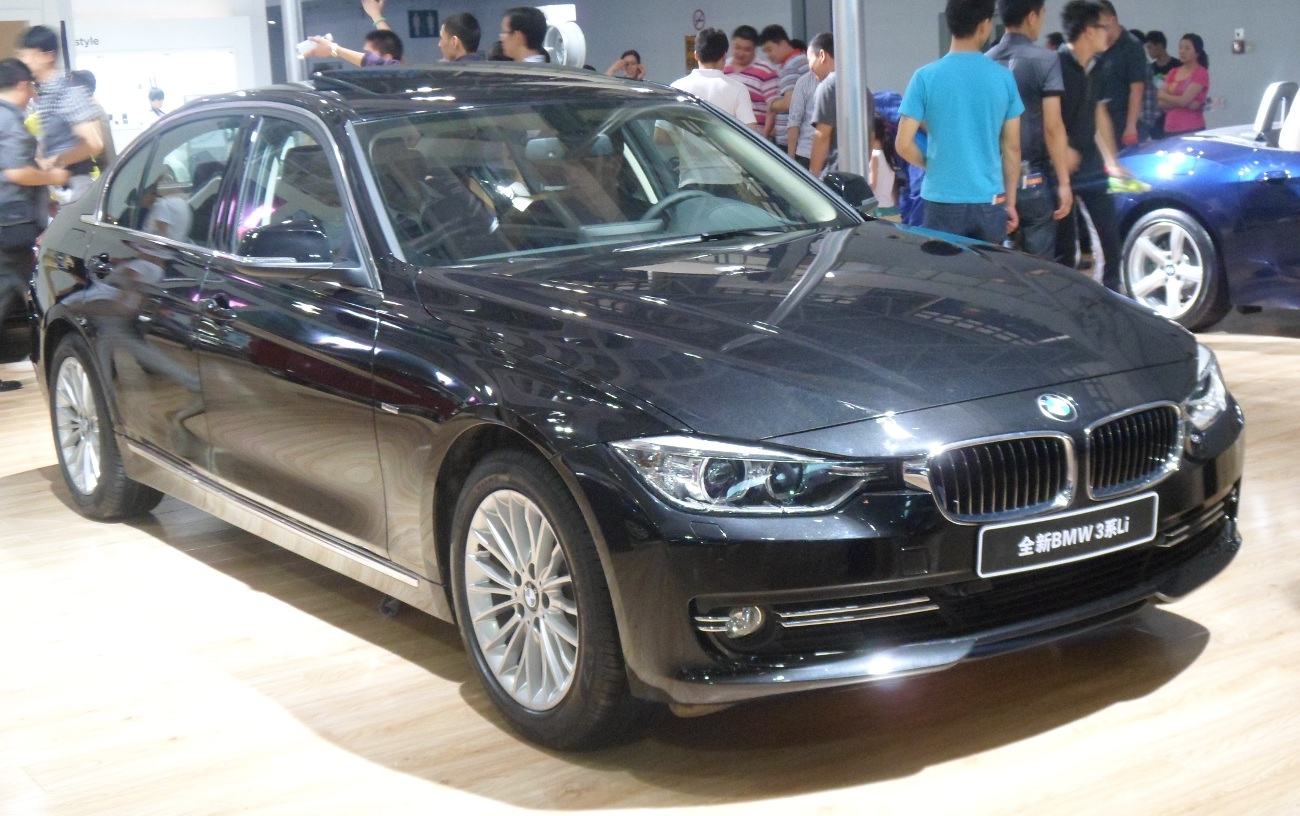

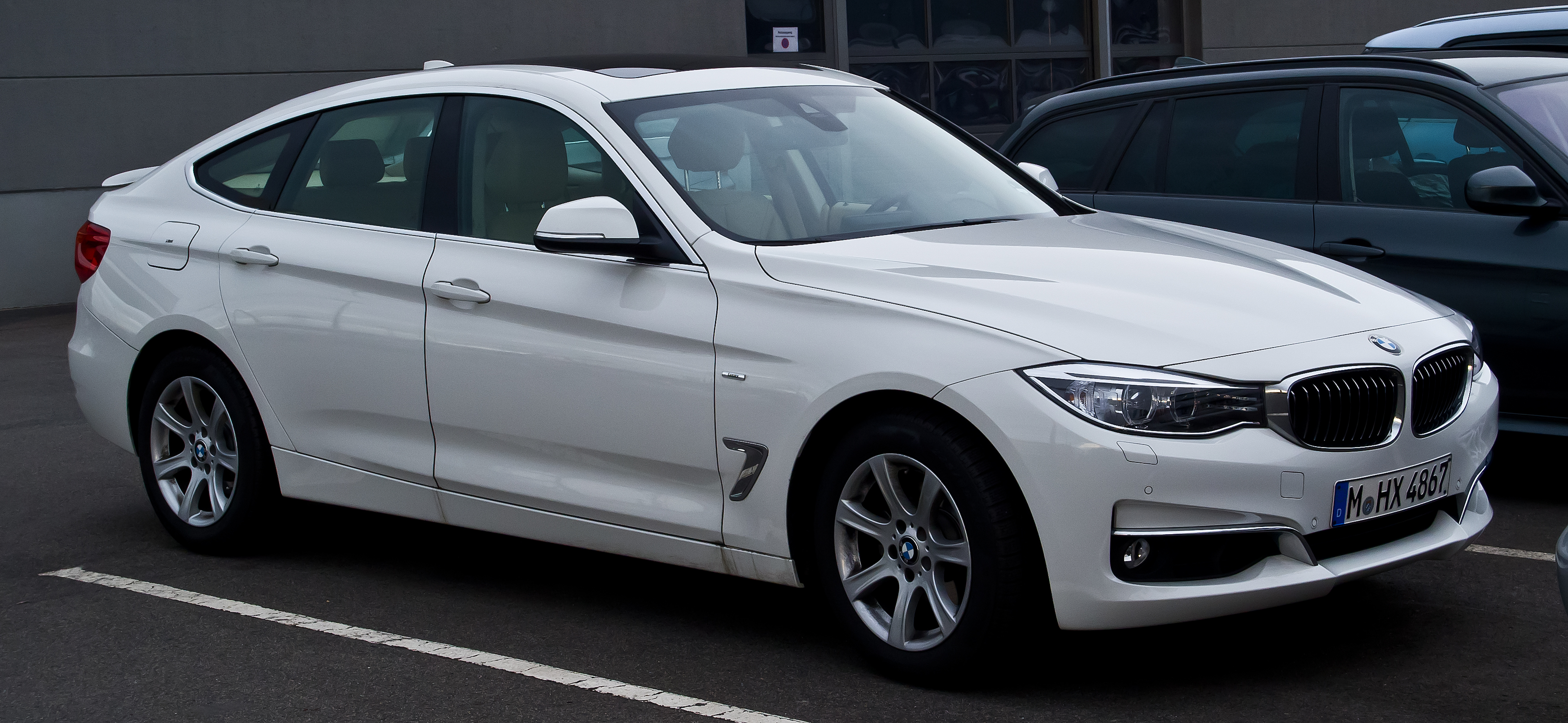

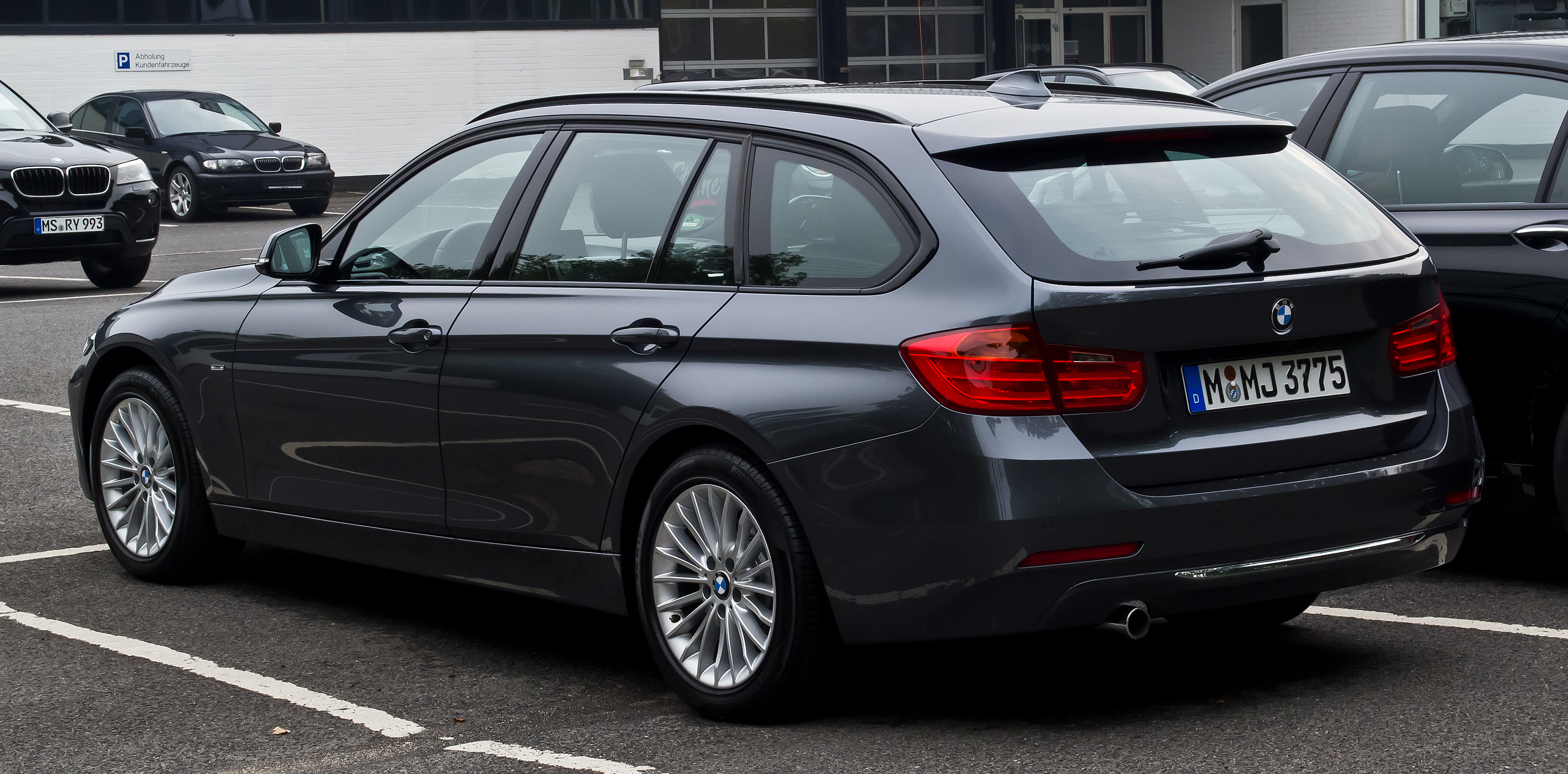

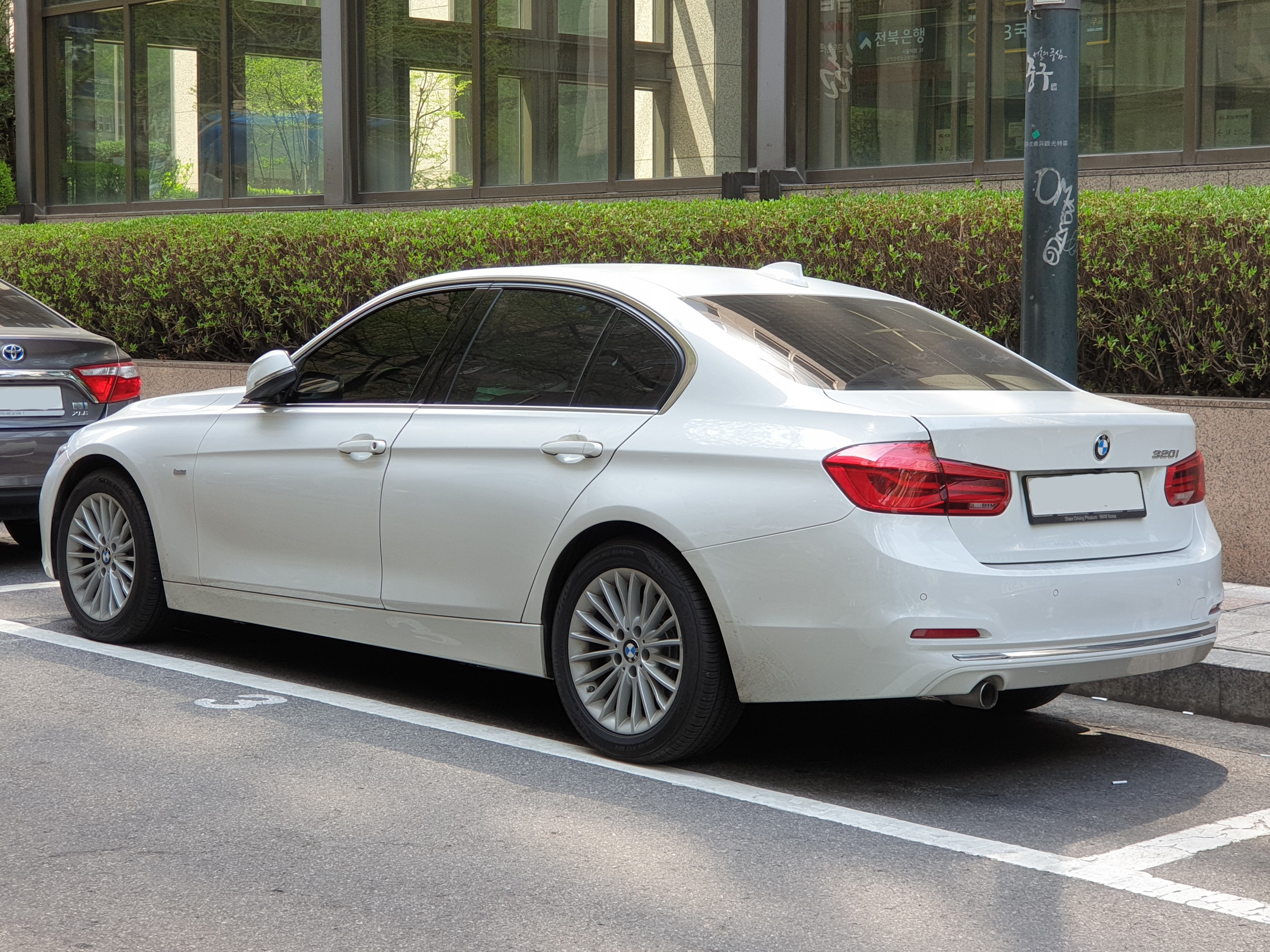

Modern Line

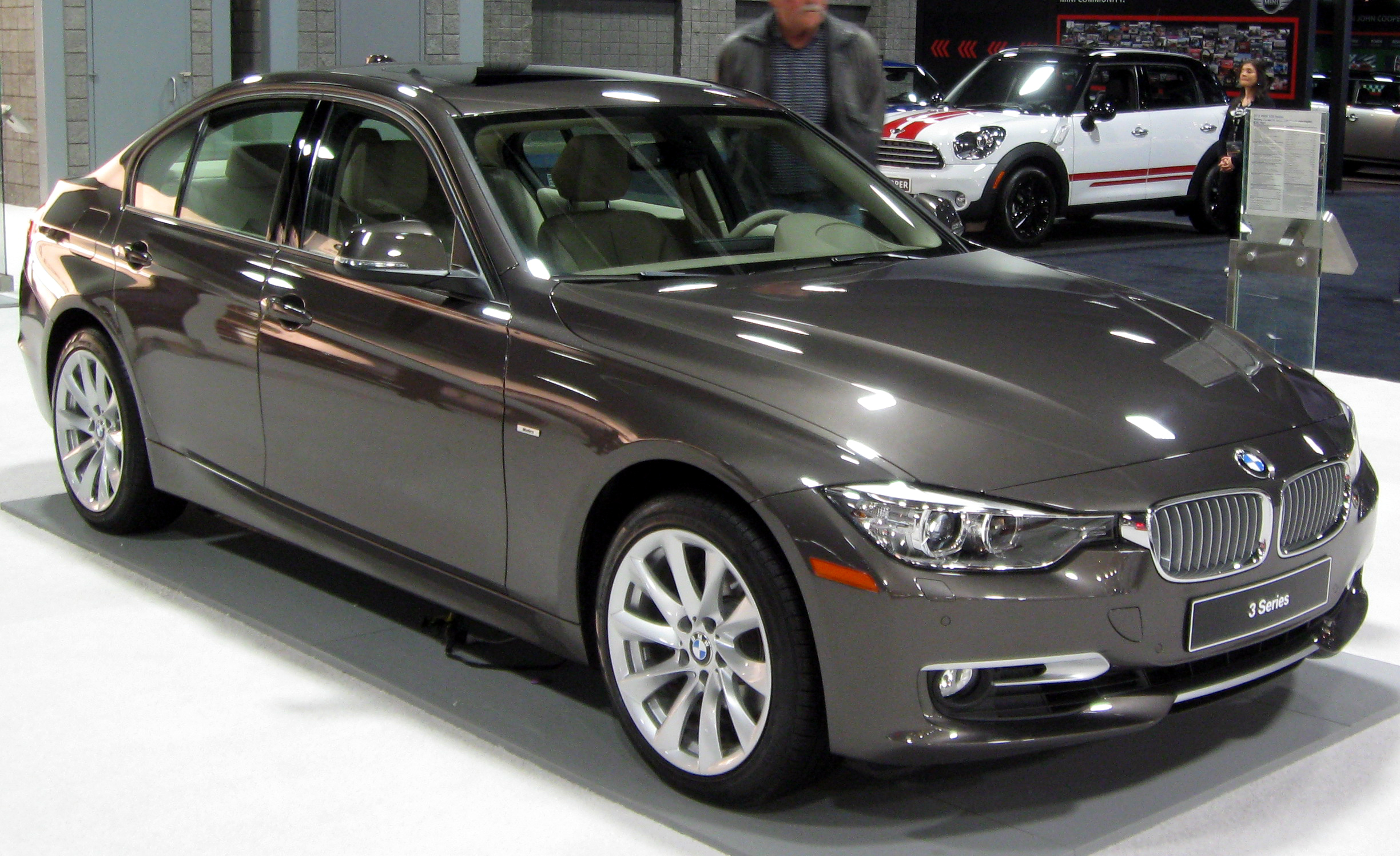

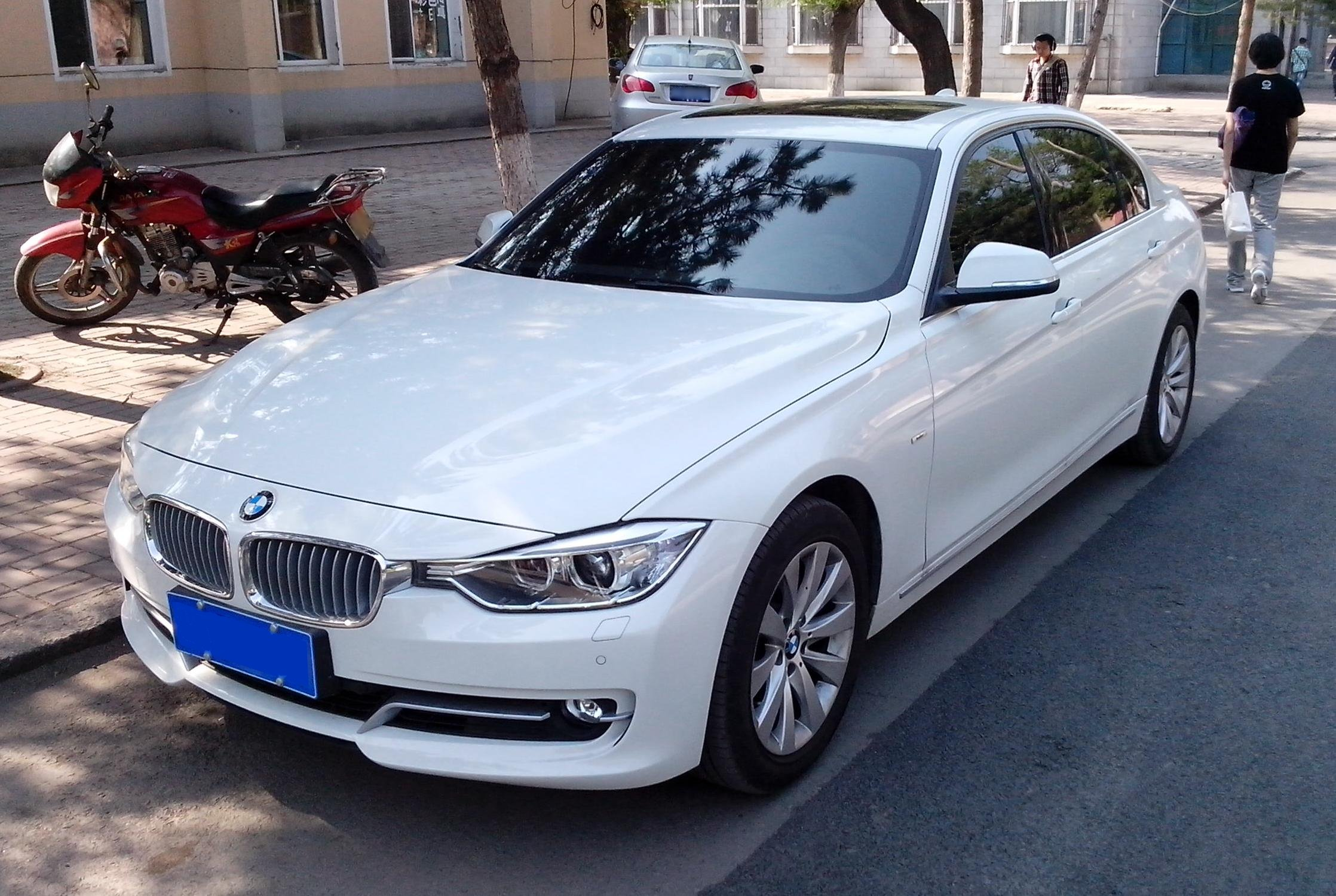

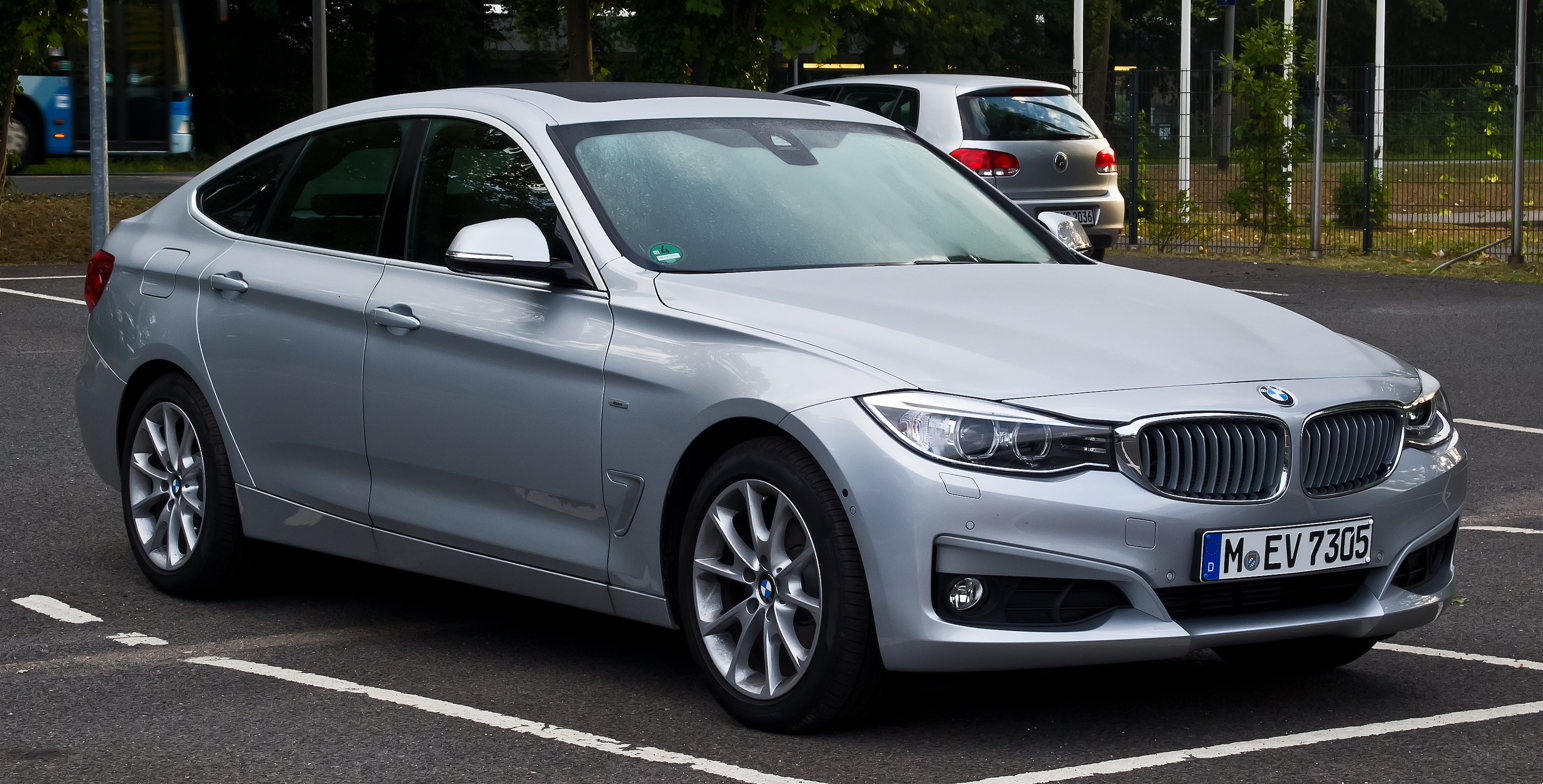

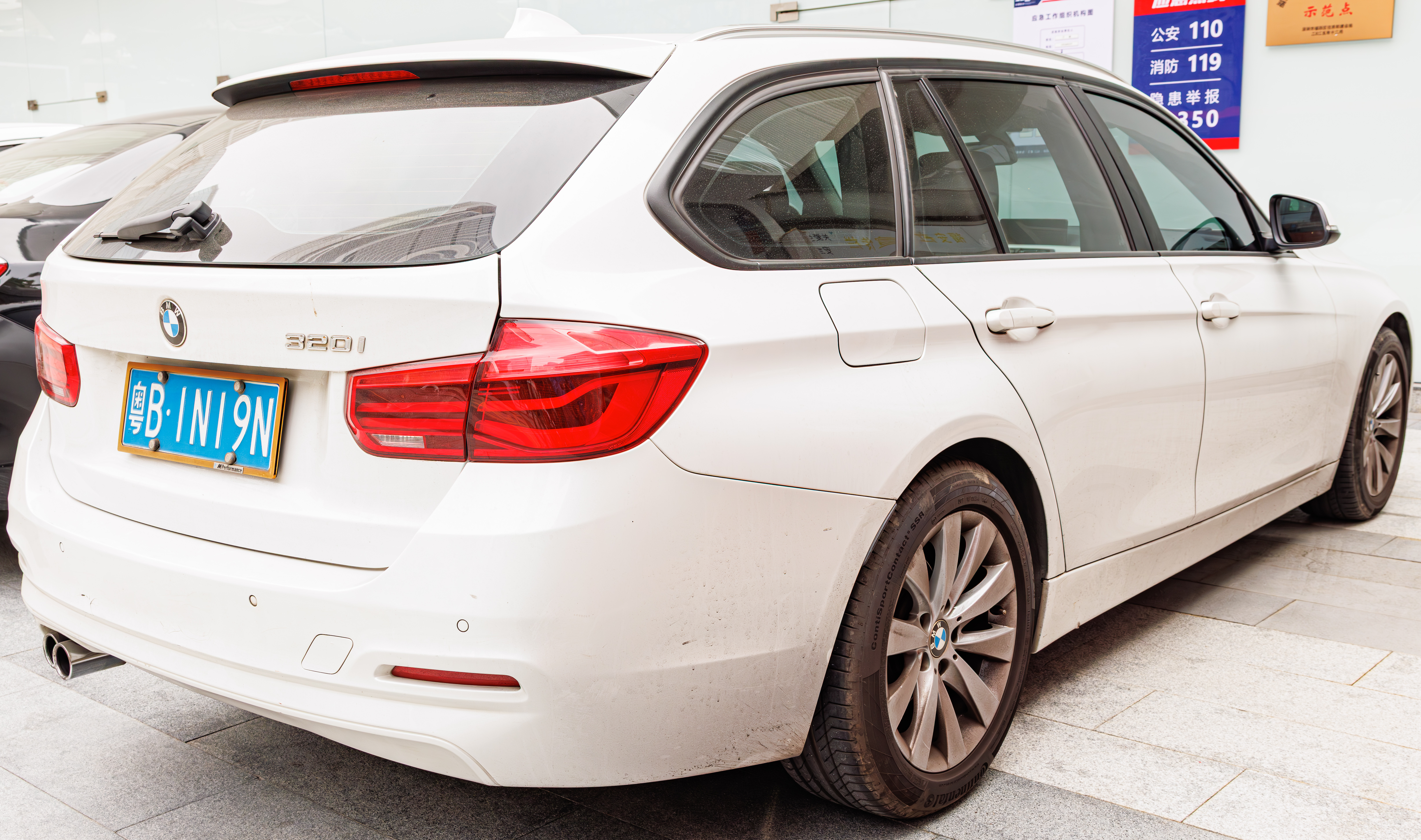

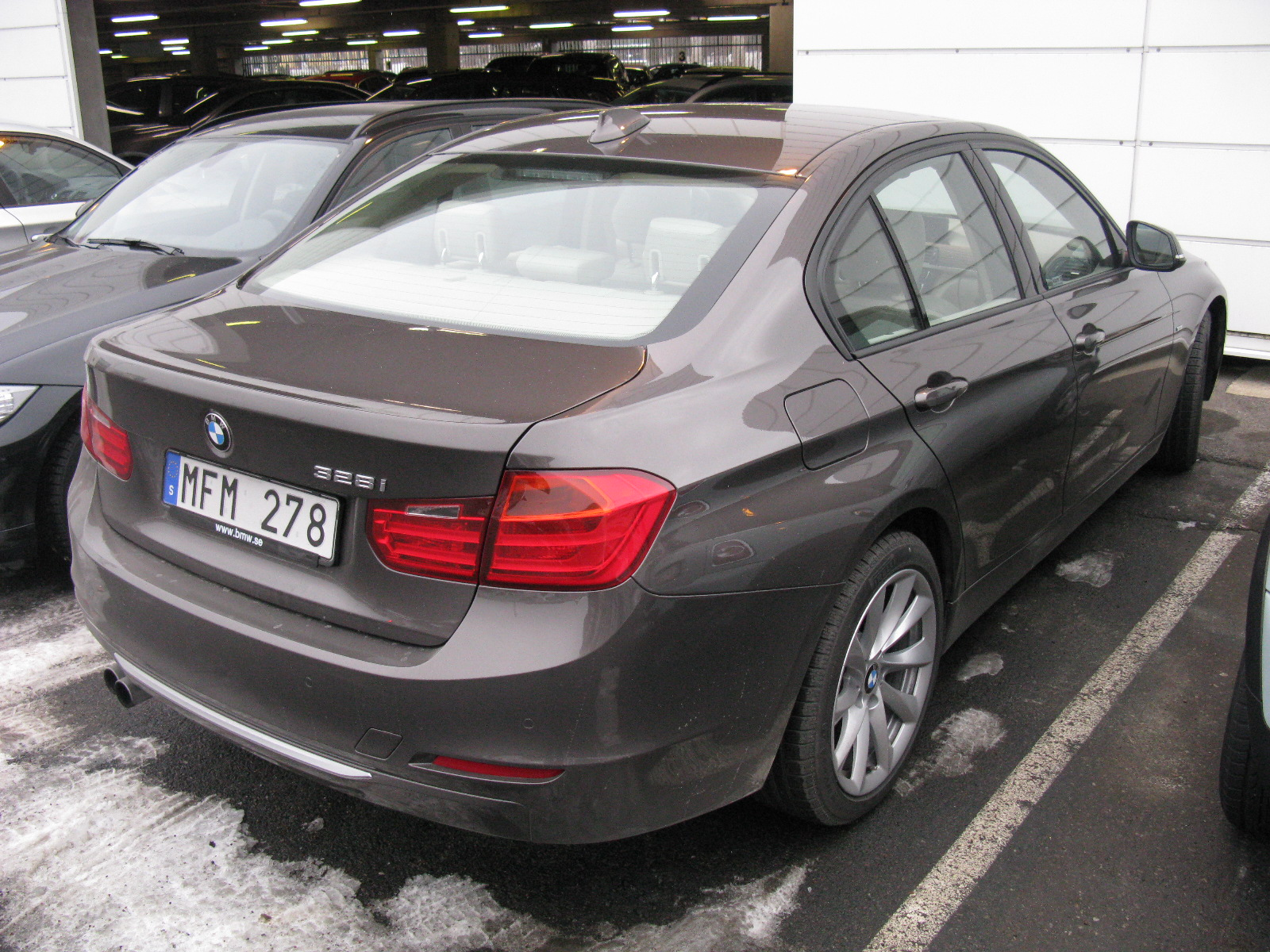

Sport Line

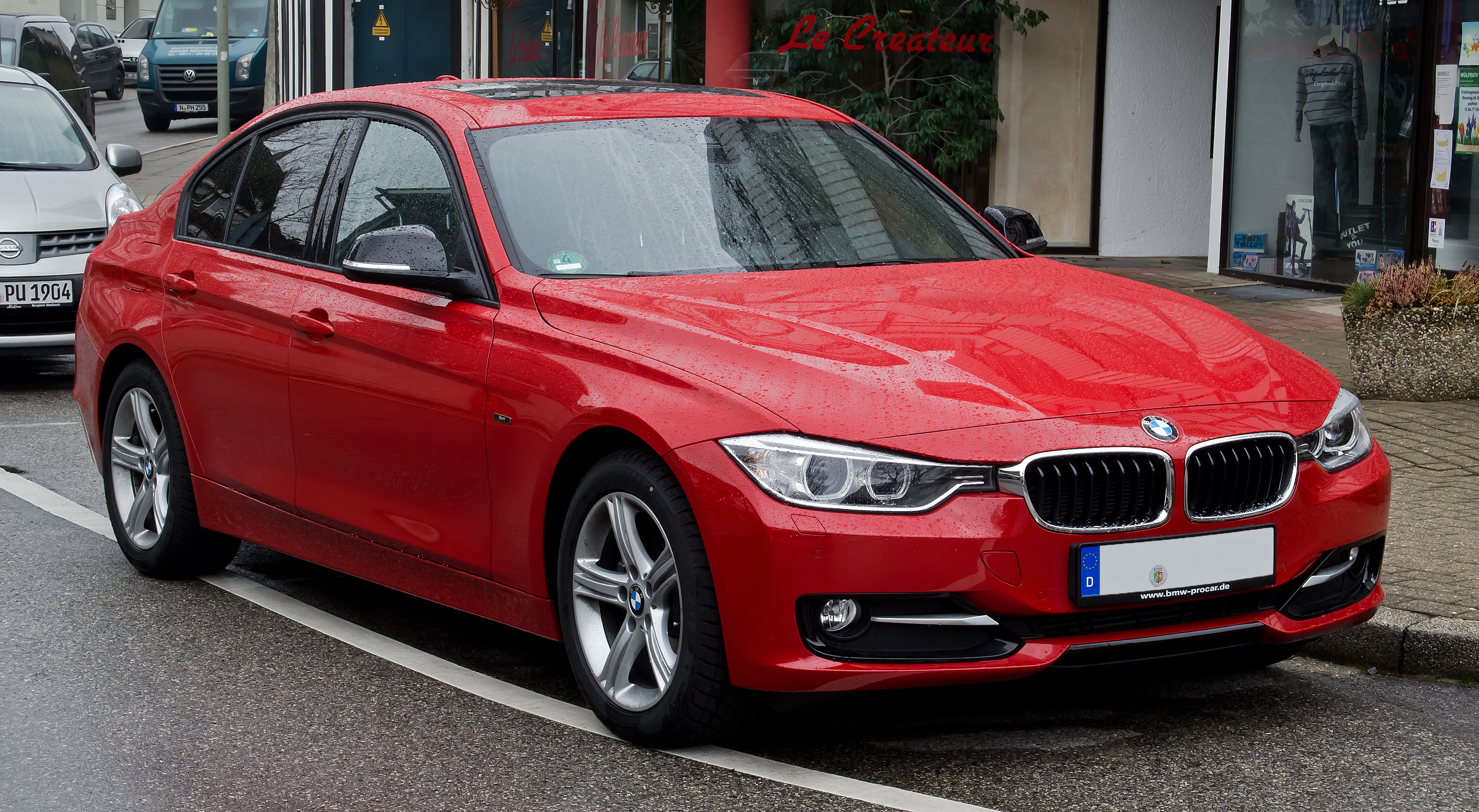

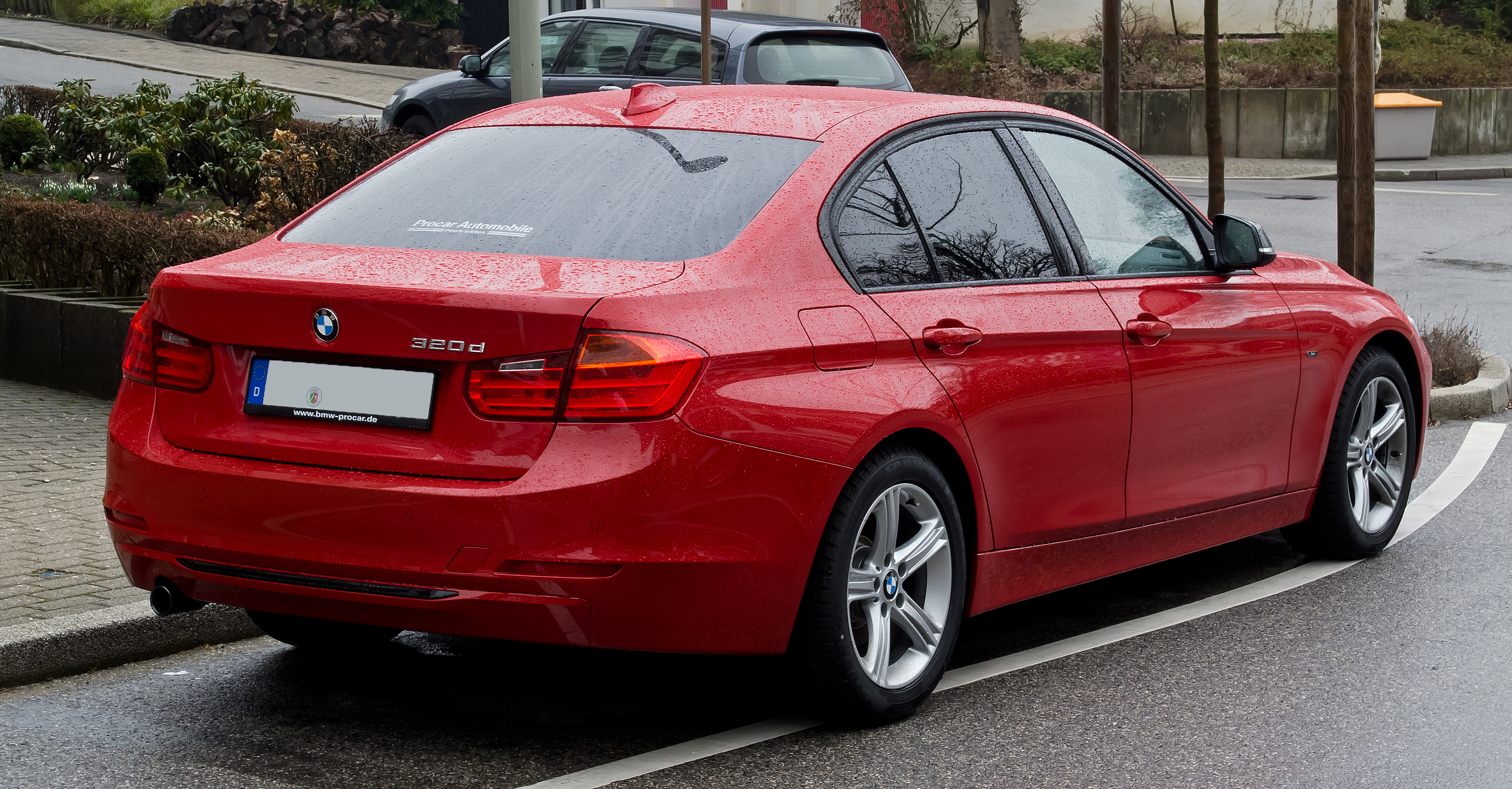

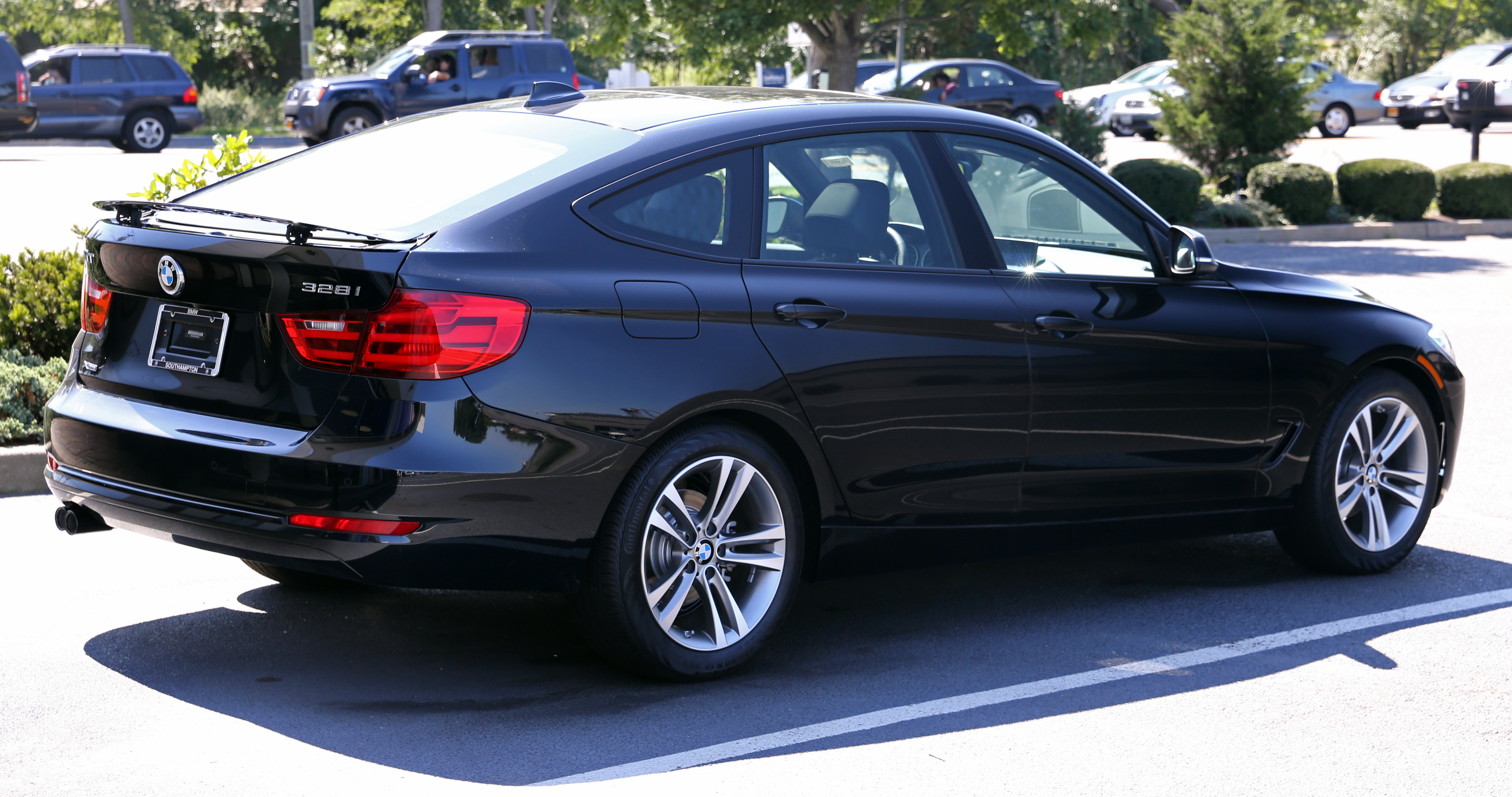

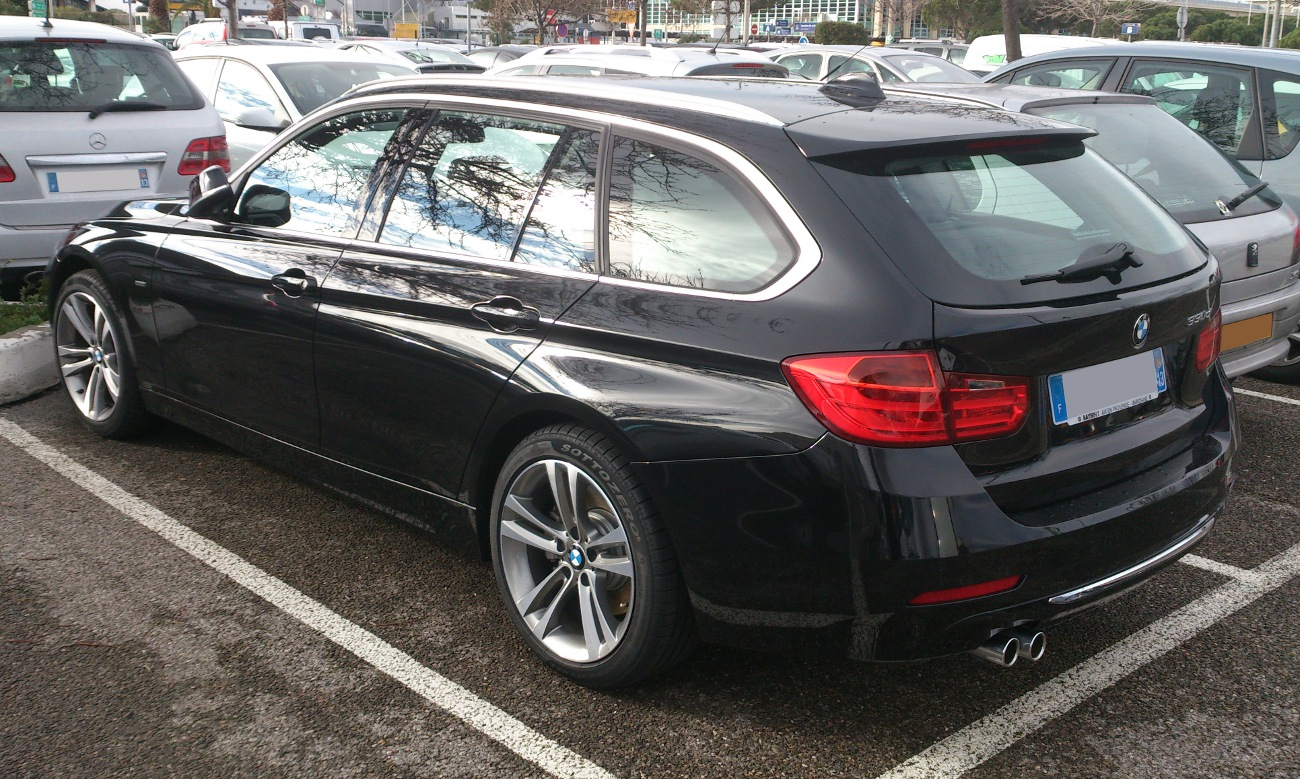

M Sport

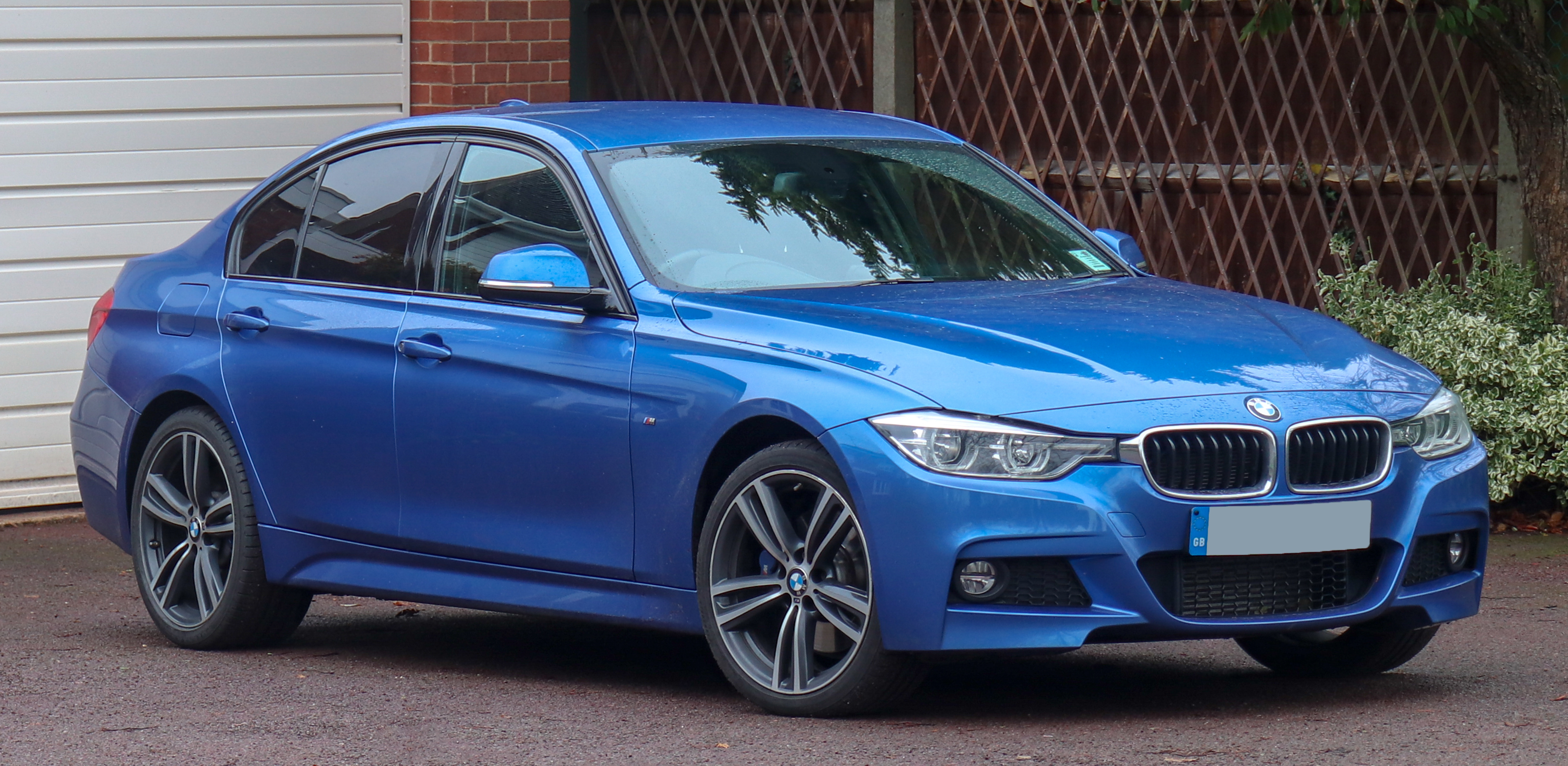

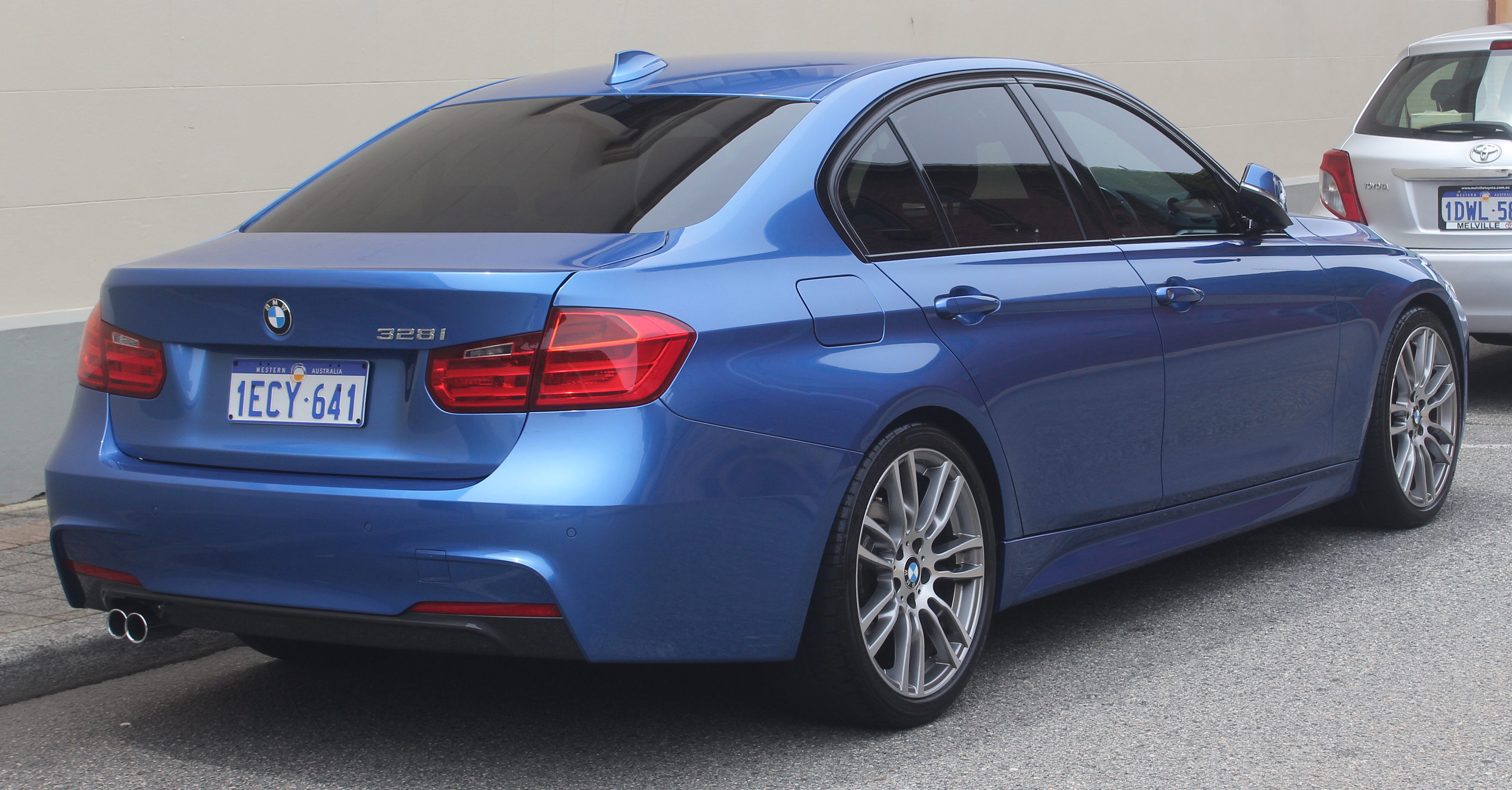

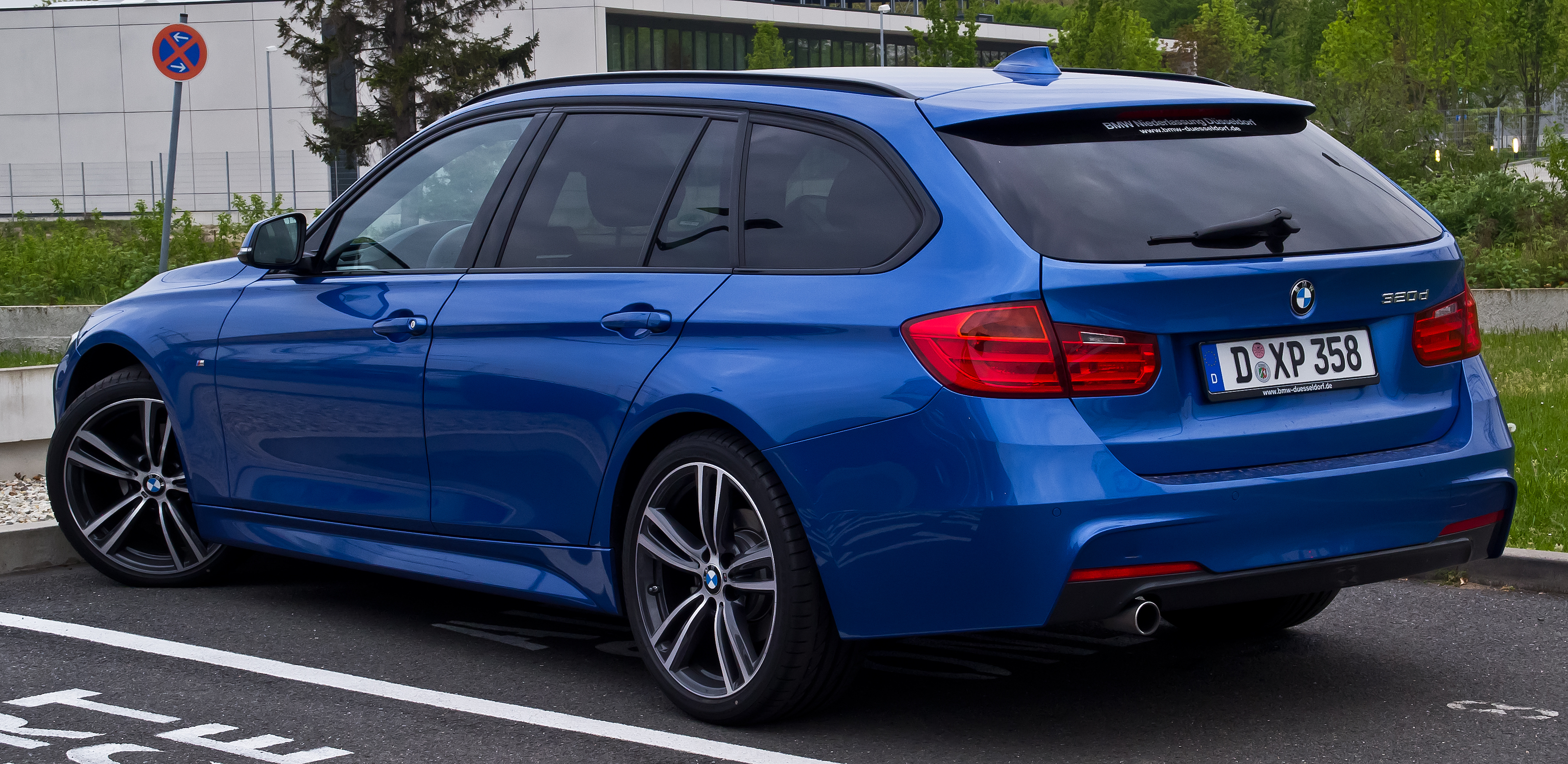

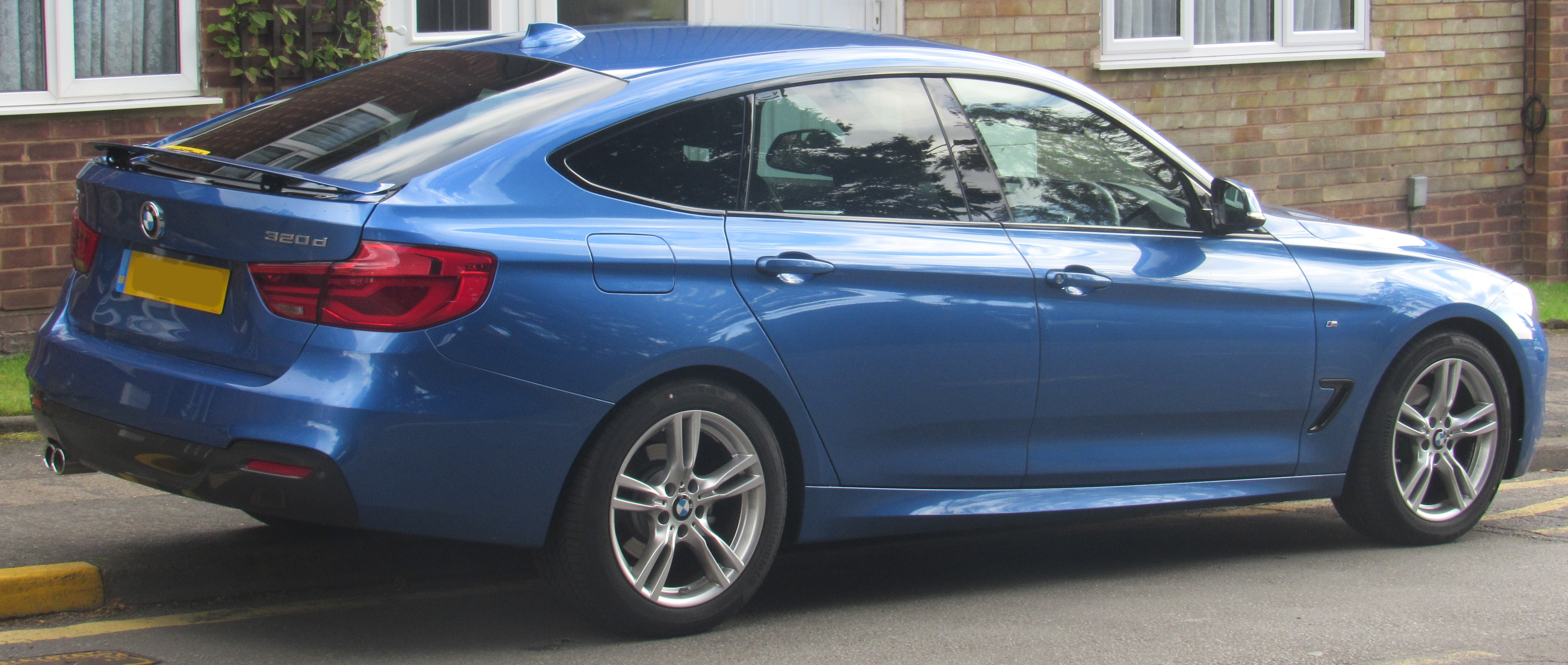

== Interior and equipment ==
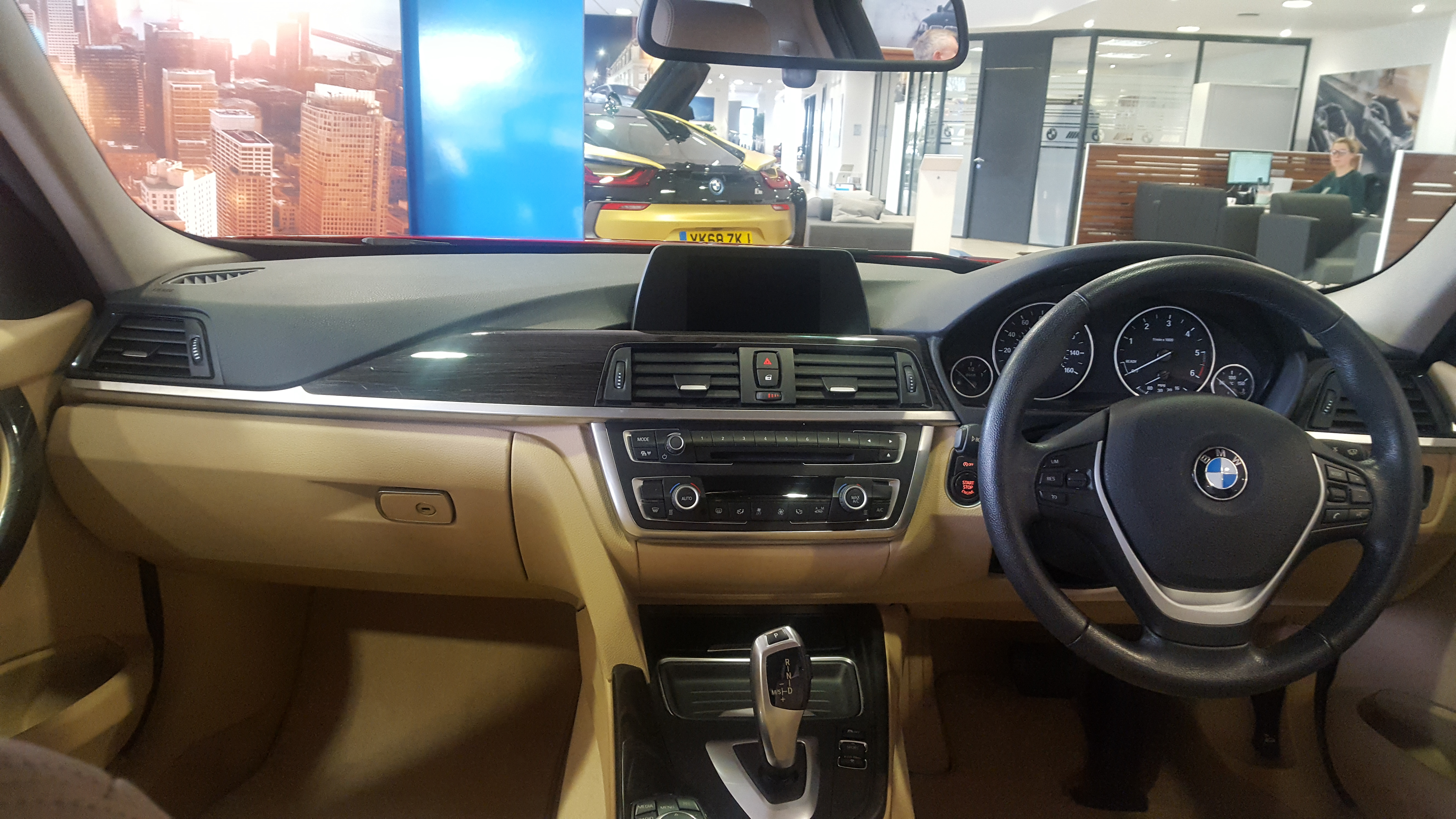
Luxury Line

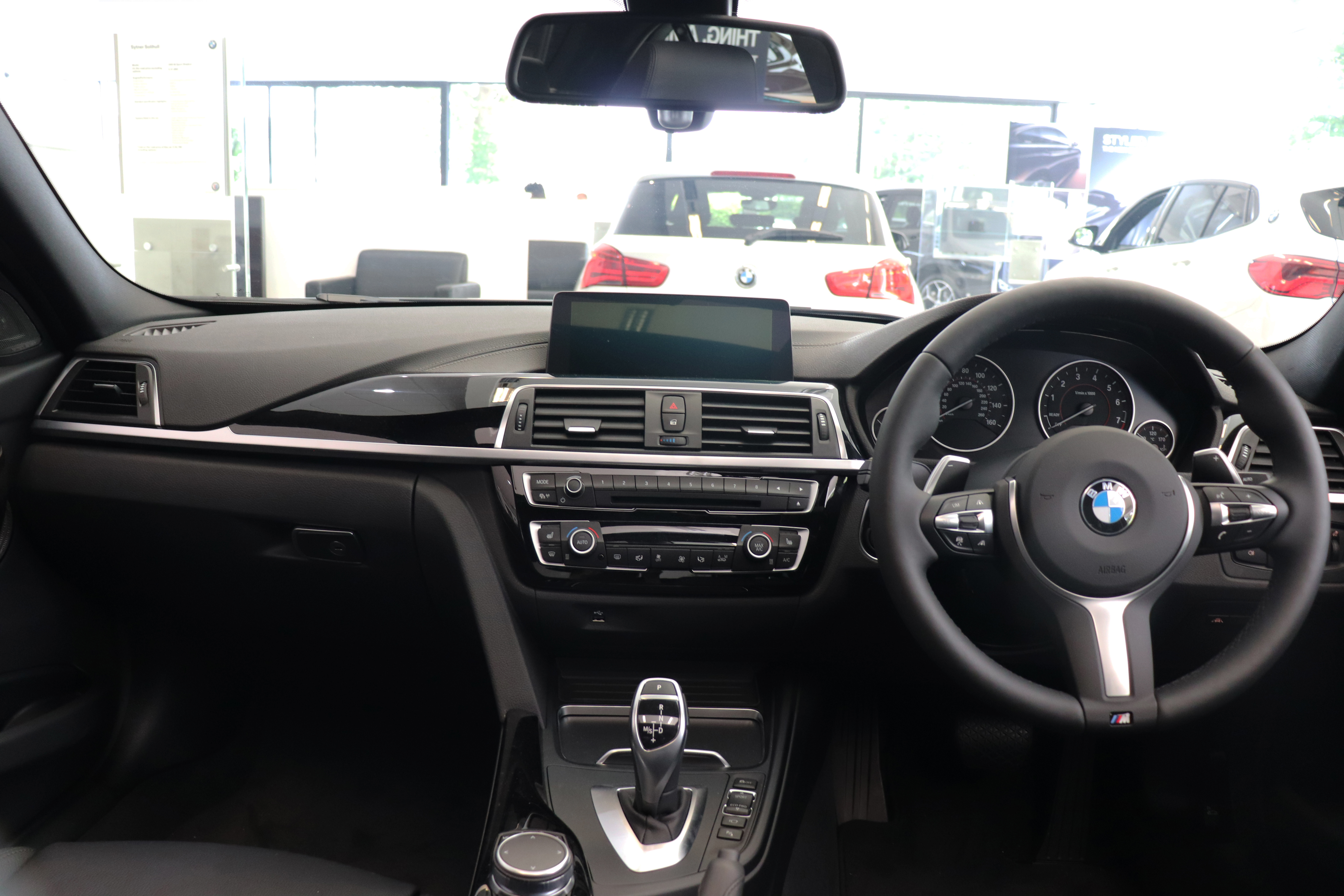
M Sport

In the sedan models, the rear headroom, leg room and shoulder room increased compared with their E90 predecessors.

Options include heated front seats, split-fold rear seats, satellite navigation and a widescreen display in the centre console. The Bluetooth that's built-in into the car now supports audio streaming. The traditional mechanical shift lever was replaced by a shift by wire shifter (first used by BMW in the 2007 E70 X5).

M Performance Parts can be fitted to all models with the M Sport trim. These include sport brakes for 18 inch and higher wheels, side skirt ground effects, black kidney grilles and carbon fibre mirrors.

== Engines ==
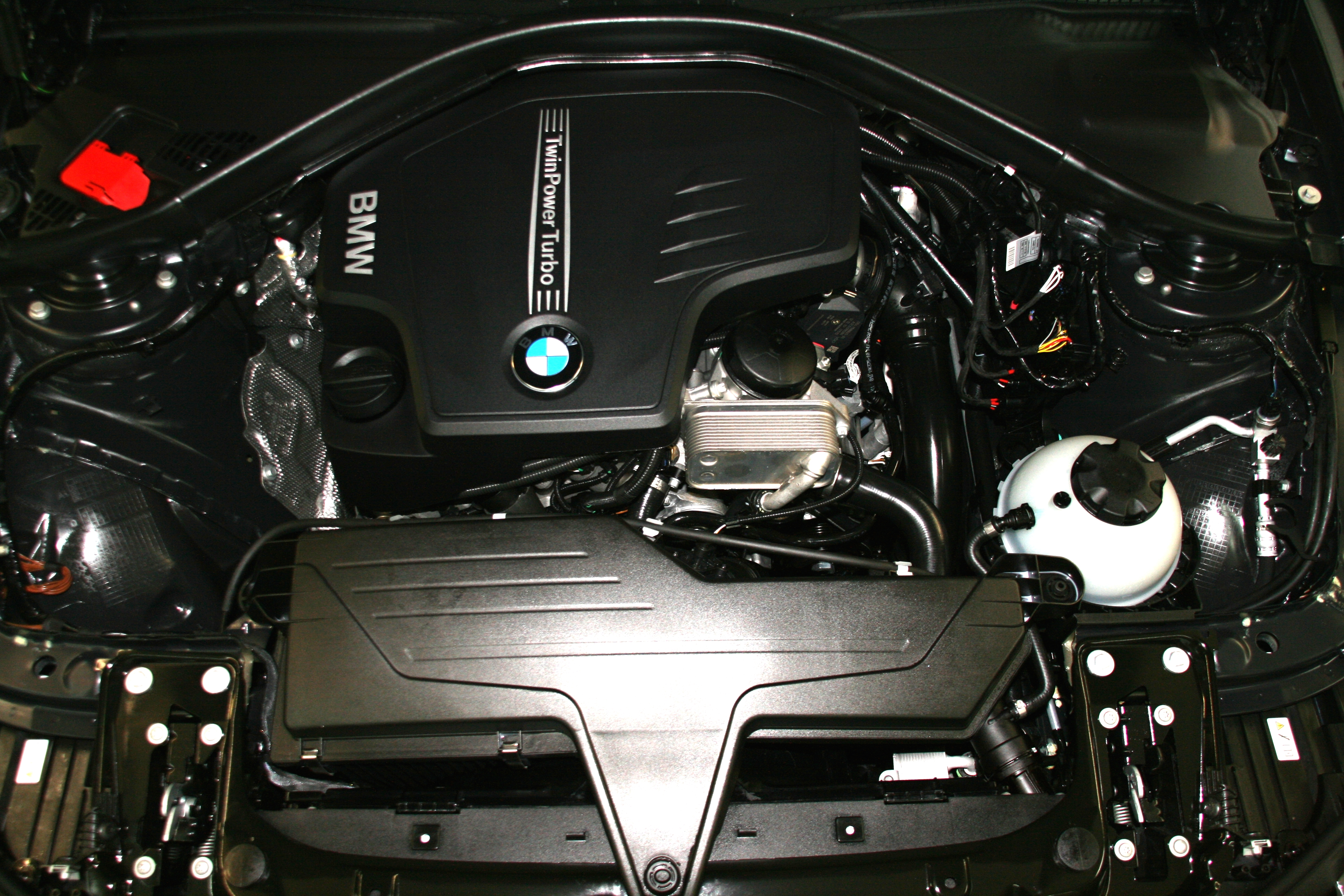
BMW straight-four petrol engine (N20)

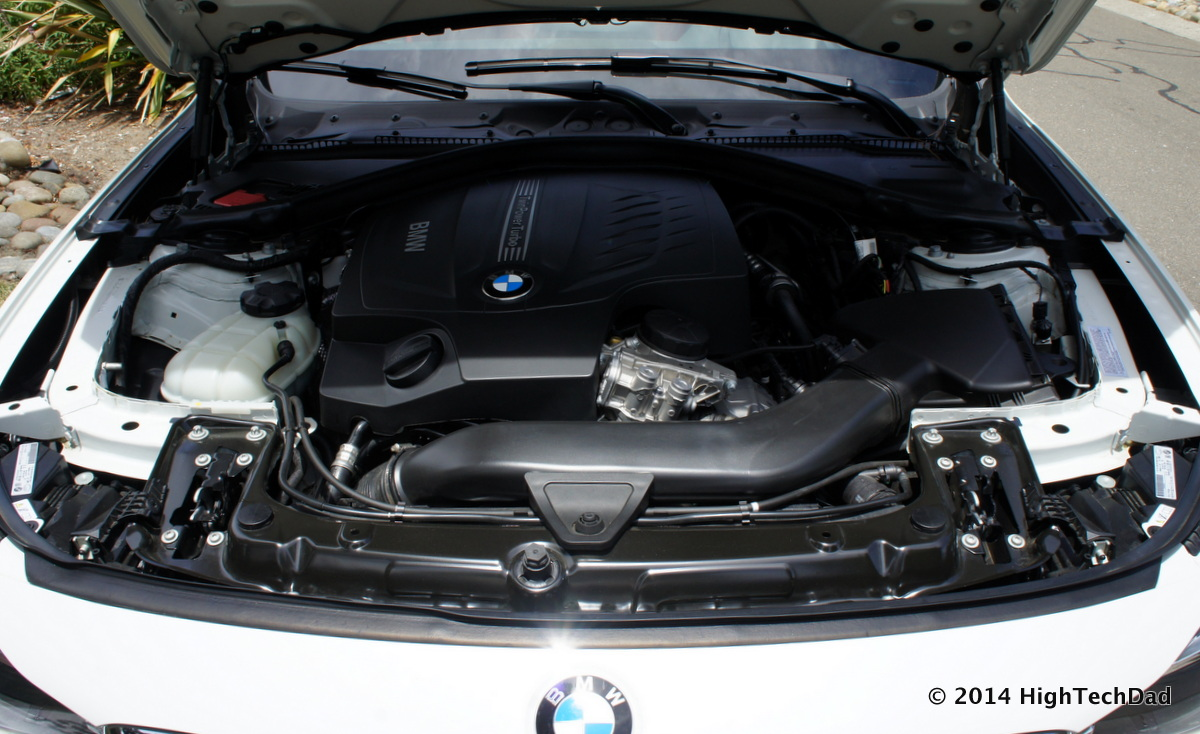
BMW straight-six petrol engine (N55)

The petrol models initially used the turbocharged 4-cylinder N13, 4-cylinder N20 and 6-cylinder N55 engines. This meant that the 328i models (traditionally powered by naturally-aspirated 6-cylinder engines) now used the turbocharged 4-cylinder N20 engine. For the 2016 facelift (LCI), the engines were updated to the 3-cylinder B38, the 4-cylinder B48 and the 6-cylinder B58.

The diesel models initially used the 4-cylinder N47 and 6-cylinder N57 turbocharged engines. For the 2016 facelift, the 4-cylinder models were updated to the B47 engine, while the 6-cylinder models retained the N57 engine.

=== Petrol ===
Model	Years	Engine- turbo	Power	Torque
316i	2012–2015	N13B16 straight-4	100 kW (134 hp) at 4,400–6,450 rpm	220 N⋅m (160 lbf⋅ft) at 1,350–4,300 rpm
318i	2015–2019	B38B15 straight-3	100 kW (134 hp) at 4,400–6,000 rpm	220 N⋅m (160 lbf⋅ft) at 1,250–4,300 rpm
320i	2012–2015	N20B20 straight-4	135 kW (181 hp) at 5,000 rpm	270 N⋅m (200 lbf⋅ft) at 1,250–4,500 rpm
320i	2015–2019	B48B20 straight-4	135 kW (181 hp) at 5,000–6,500 rpm	270 N⋅m (200 lbf⋅ft) at 1,350–4,600 rpm
320i EfficientDynamics	2012–2015	N13B16 straight-4	125 kW (168 hp) at 4,800–6,450 rpm	250 N⋅m (180 lbf⋅ft) at 1,500–4,500 rpm
328i	2012–2015	N20B20 straight-4	180 kW (241 hp) at 5,000–6,500 rpm	350 N⋅m (260 lbf⋅ft) at 1,250–4,800 rpm
330i	2015–2019	B48B20 straight-4	185 kW (248 hp) at 5,200–6,500 rpm	350 N⋅m (260 lbf⋅ft) at 1,450–4,800 rpm
335i	2012–2015	N55B30M0 straight-6	225 kW (302 hp) at 5,800–6,400 rpm	400 N⋅m (300 lbf⋅ft) at 1,200–5,000 rpm
340i	2015–2019	B58B30M0 straight-6	240 kW (322 hp) at 5,500–6,500 rpm	450 N⋅m (330 lbf⋅ft) at 1,380–5,000 rpm
M3 (F80)	2014–2020	S55B30 straight-6	317 kW (425 hp) at 5,500–7,300 rpm	550 N⋅m (410 lbf⋅ft) at 1,850–5,500 rpm
M3 Competition (F80)	2016–2020	S55B30 straight-6	331 kW (444 hp) at 7,000 rpm	550 N⋅m (410 lbf⋅ft) at 1,850–5,500 rpm
M3 CS (F80)	2018–2020	S55B30 straight-6	338 kW (453 hp) at 6,250 rpm	600 N⋅m (440 lbf⋅ft) at 4,000–5,380 rpm

=== Diesel ===
Model	Years	Engine- turbo	Power	Torque
316d	2012–2015	N47D20 straight-4	85 kW (114 hp) at 4,000 rpm	260 N⋅m (190 lbf⋅ft) at 1,750–2,500 rpm
316d	2015–2019	B47D20 straight-4	85 kW (114 hp) at 4,000 rpm	270 N⋅m (200 lbf⋅ft) at 1,250–2,750 rpm
318d	2012–2015	N47D20 straight-4	105 kW (141 hp) at 4,000 rpm	320 N⋅m (240 lbf⋅ft) at 1,750–2,500 rpm
318d	2015–2019	B47D20 straight-4	110 kW (148 hp) at 4,000 rpm	320 N⋅m (240 lbf⋅ft) at 1,500–3,000 rpm
320d (Note: Sold as the 328d in North America)	2012–2015	N47D20 straight-4	135 kW (181 hp) at 4,000 rpm	380 N⋅m (280 lbf⋅ft) at 1,750–2,750 rpm
320d	2015–2019	B47D20 straight-4	140 kW (188 hp) at 4,000 rpm	400 N⋅m (300 lbf⋅ft) at 1,750–2,500 rpm
320d EfficientDynamics	2012–2015	N47D20 straight-4	120 kW (161 hp) at 4,000 rpm	380 N⋅m (280 lbf⋅ft) at 1,750–2,750 rpm
320d EfficientDynamics	2015–2019	B47D20 straight-4	120 kW (161 hp) at 4,000 rpm	400 N⋅m (300 lbf⋅ft) at 1,750–2,250 rpm
325d	2013–2015	N47D20 straight-4	160 kW (215 hp) at 4,000 rpm	450 N⋅m (330 lbf⋅ft) at 1,500–2,500 rpm
325d	2015–2019	B47D20 straight-4	165 kW (221 hp) at 4,000 rpm	450 N⋅m (330 lbf⋅ft) at 1,500–3,000 rpm
330d	2012–2019	N57D30O1 straight-6	190 kW (255 hp) at 4,000 rpm	560 N⋅m (410 lbf⋅ft) at 1,500–3,000 rpm
335d	2013–2019	N57D30T1 straight-6	230 kW (308 hp) at 4,000 rpm	630 N⋅m (460 lbf⋅ft) at 1,500–2,500 rpm

=== Hybrid ===
Model	Years	Engine- turbo	Power	Torque
ActiveHybrid 3	2012–2015	N55B30HP straight-6 + electric motor	250 kW (335 hp) at 5,800–6,000 rpm	450 N⋅m (330 lbf⋅ft) at 1,000–5,000 rpm
330e iPerformance	2015–2018	B48B20 straight-4 + electric motor	185 kW (248 hp) at 5,000–6,500 rpm	420 N⋅m (310 lbf⋅ft) at 1,450–3,700 rpm

== Transmissions ==
The available transmissions are:

- 6-speed Getrag GS6-17BG manual
- 6-speed ZF GS6-45BZ manual
- 8-speed ZF 8HP45 automatic
- 8-speed ZF 8HP50 automatic
- 8-speed ZF 8HP70 automatic

== M3 models ==
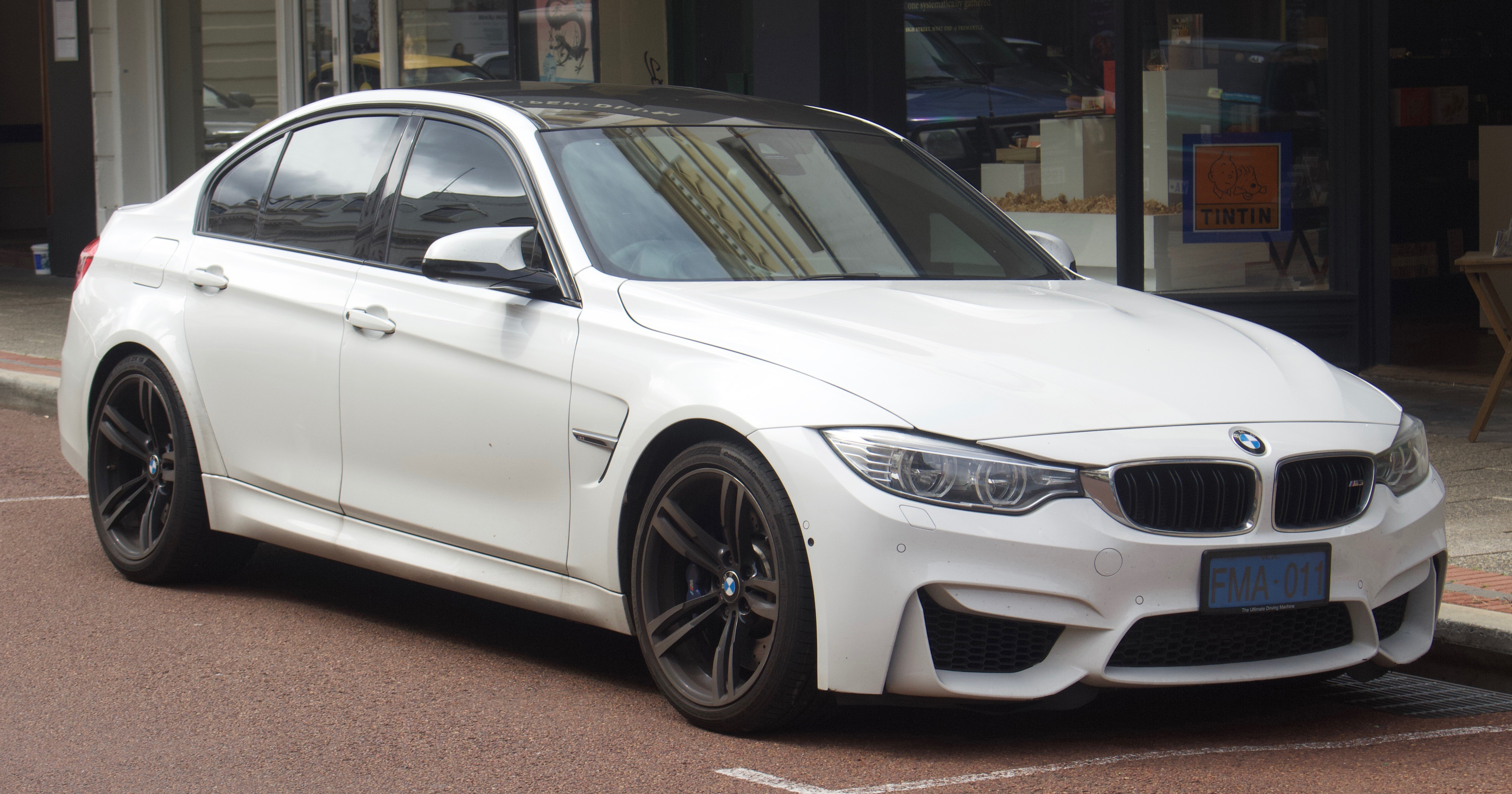

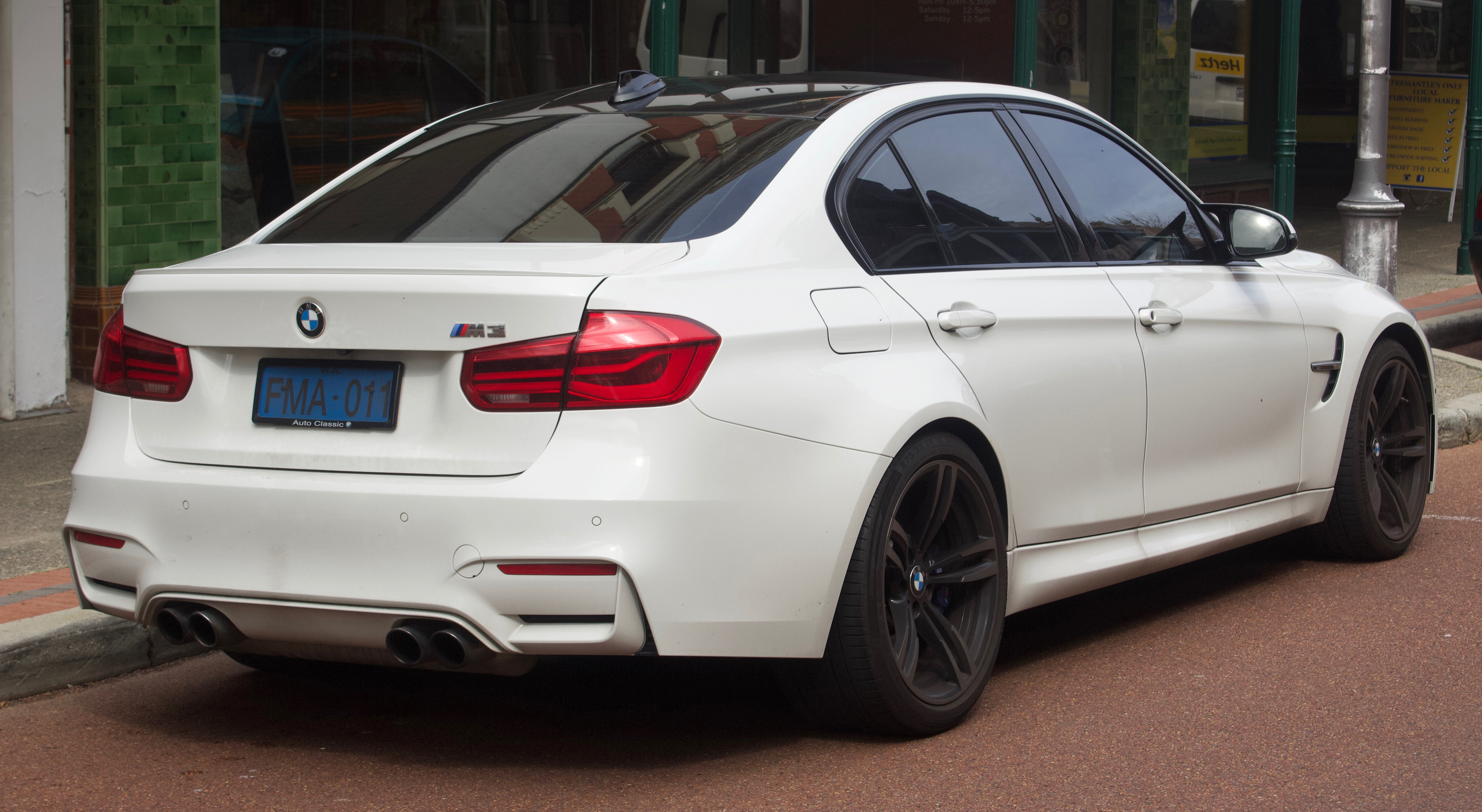
BMW M3 (F80)

The M3 models based on the F30 3 Series were introduced in 2014. Designated F80 for the M3 (sedan) alongside F82 for the M4 (coupe), it is the first time an M3 has used a separate model code, and the first time an M coupe was designated M4. They are powered by the S55 twin-turbocharged straight-six engine. Production of the M3 ended in 2020. The F80 M3 was succeeded by the G80 M3.

== Special models ==
=== ActiveHybrid 3 ===
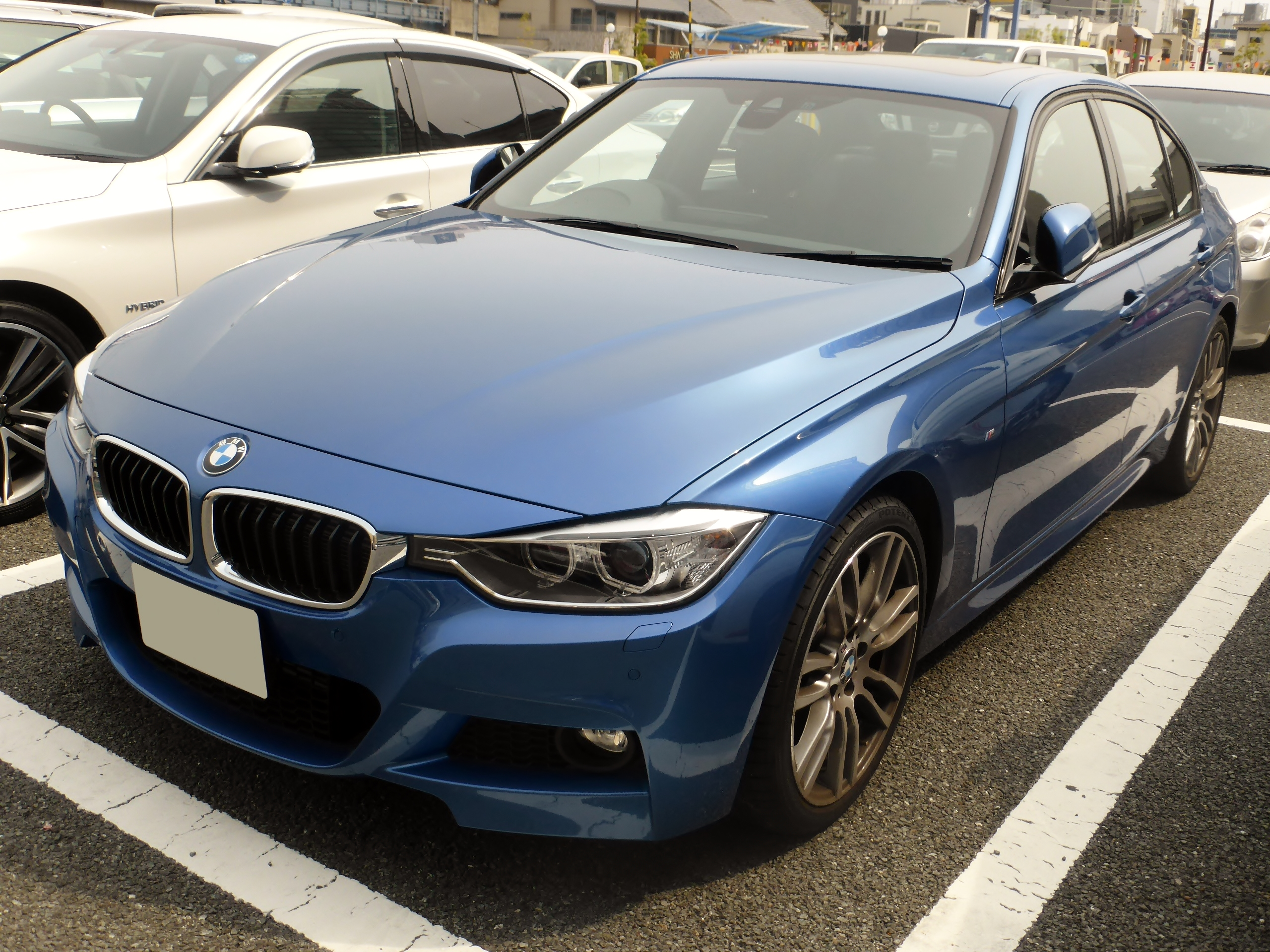
BMW ActiveHybrid 3 M Sport

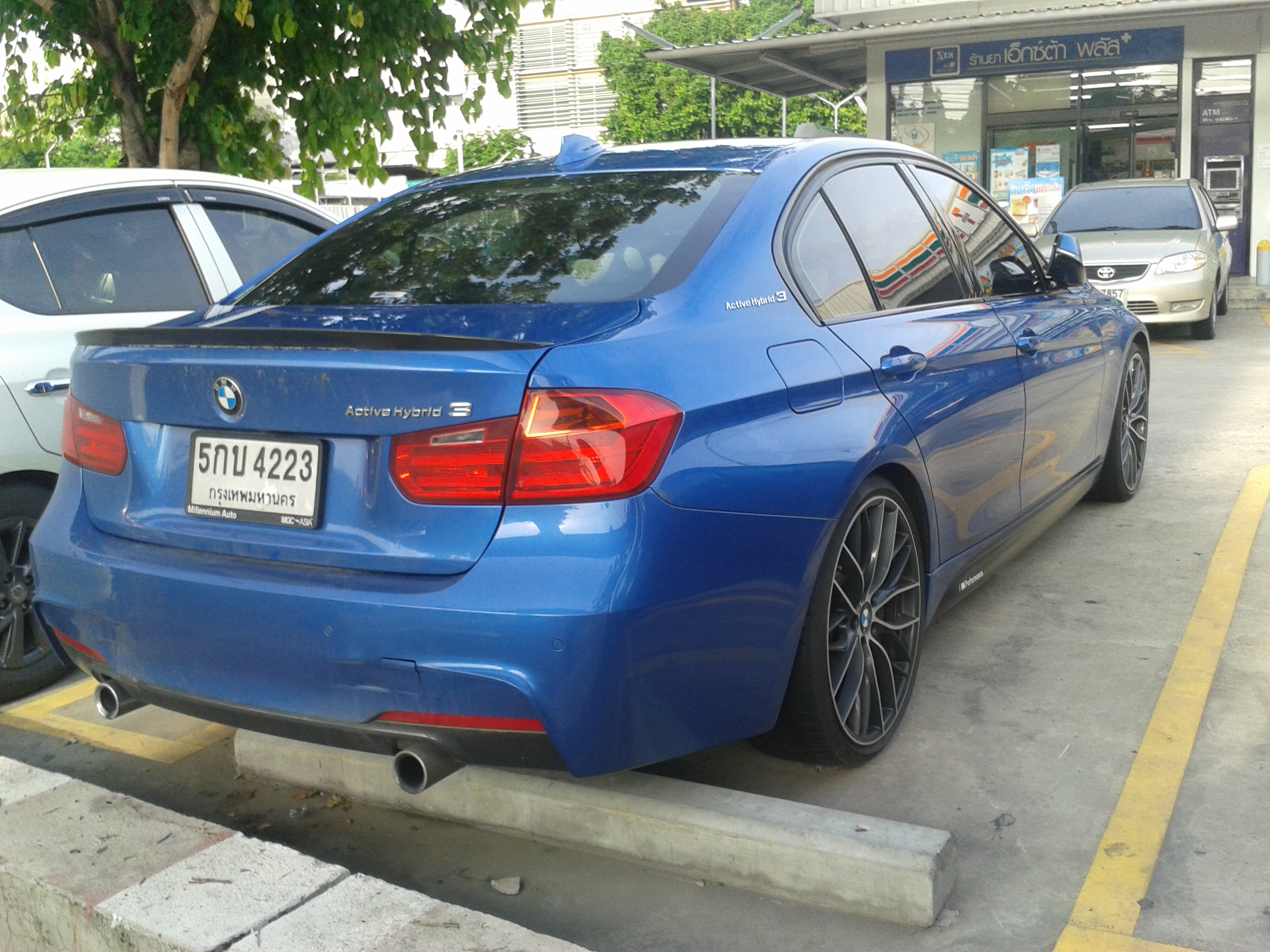
BMW ActiveHybrid 3 M Sport

Based on the 335i Sedan, the ActiveHybrid 3 includes a 40 kW (54 hp) synchronous electric motor, bringing the total system output to 250 kW (335 hp), with a lithium-ion battery positioned underneath the luggage area and a 2-zone climate control system with stationary air conditioning. The electric motor generates 210 N⋅m (150 lb⋅ft) of torque. The maximum all-electric driving range is 4 km (2.5 mi), with a top speed of 75 km/h (47 mph).

The BMW ActiveHybrid 3 was unveiled at the North American International Auto Show in January 2012.

The US EPA rated the 2013 ActiveHybrid 3 with a combined fuel economy of 28 mpg_{‑US} (8.4 L/100 km), with 25 mpg_{‑US} (9.4 L/100 km) in the city, and 33 mpg_{‑US} (7.1 l/100 km) on the highway.

=== 330e iPerformance ===
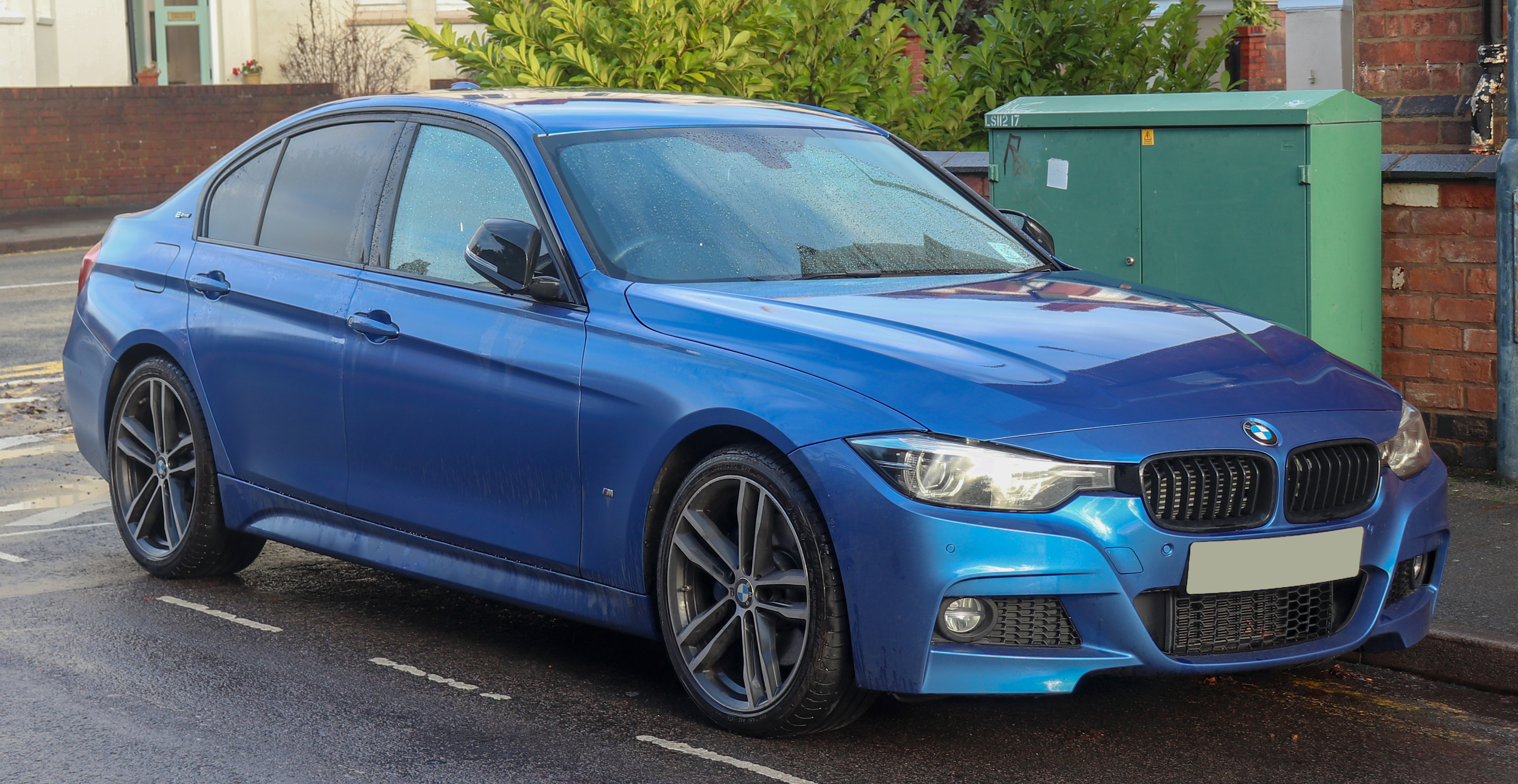
BMW 330e iPerformance M Sport

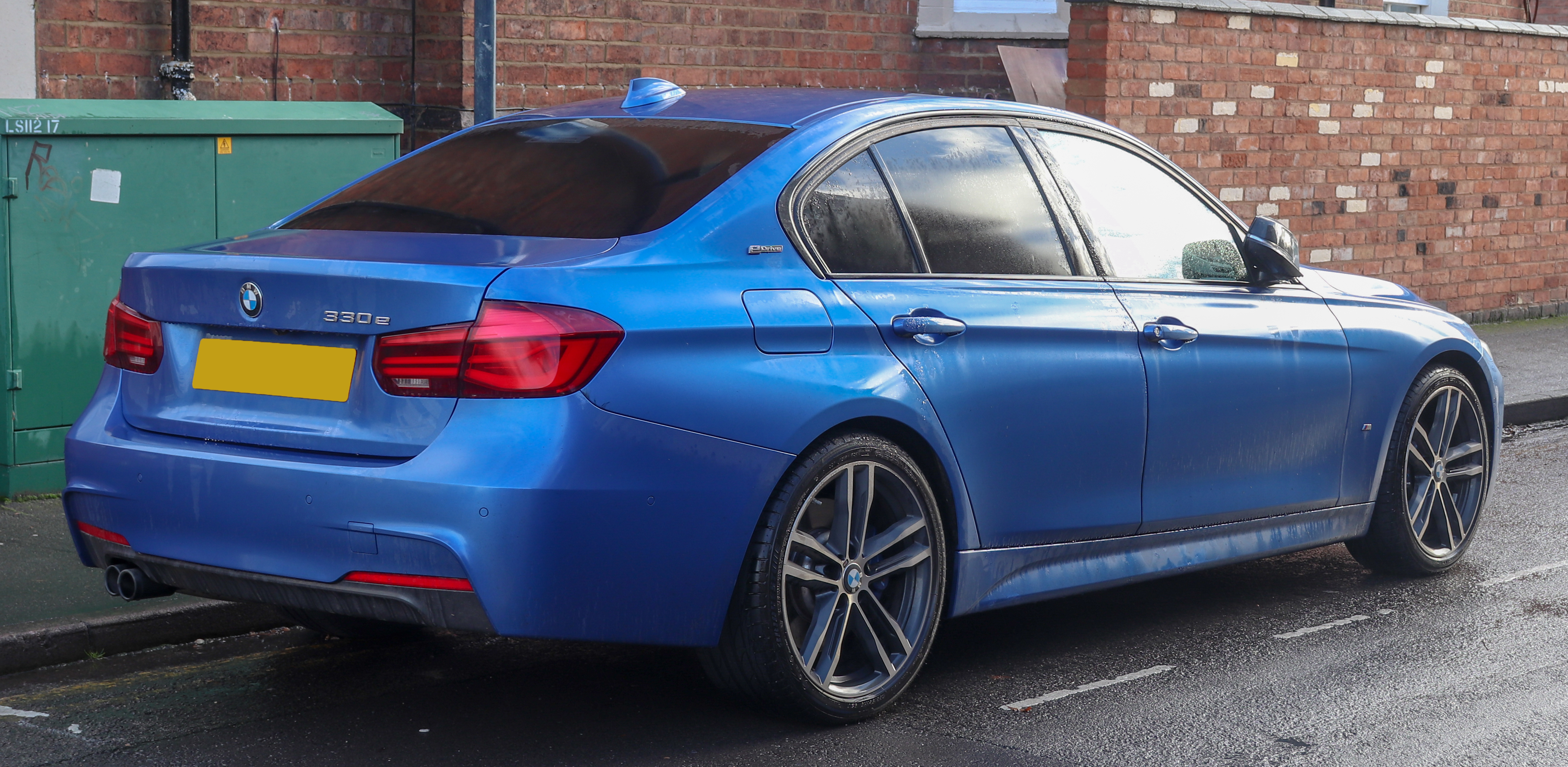
BMW 330e iPerformance M Sport

The BMW 330e iPerformance is a plug-in hybrid unveiled at the IAA in Frankfurt in September 2015. The first units were registered in Europe by late 2015 and North American sales began in 2016.

The 330e features a four-cylinder petrol engine and an 66 kW (88 hp) electric motor. The powertrain is rated at a total of 185 kW (248 hp) and 420 N⋅m (310 lb⋅ft) of torque. The United States EPA rated the 2016 BMW 330e energy consumption in all-electric mode at 47 kWh per 100 miles, which translates into a combined city/highway fuel economy of 72 miles per gallon gasoline equivalent (MPG-e) (3.3 L/100 km petrol equivalent), but only 14 miles all-electric range (Real world electric range under normal driving conditions mix of highway and city in eco mode is approximately 24km). When powered only by the petrol engine, EPA's official combined city/highway fuel economy is 31 mpg_{‑US} (7.6 L/100 km).

=== 340i ZHP ===
For the 2018 model year, BMW offered a ZHP performance package for the 340i sedan, with production limited to only 100 examples sold in North America. The package revived the ZHP designation previously used on the E46 330i and F32 435i. The package included a limited-slip differential, the M Performance Power and Sound Kit, carbon-fiber mirror caps, rear spoiler and exhaust tips, and an M Performance rear diffuser. The Power and Sound Kit combined revised engine-management software with an electronically controlled exhaust system. It increased the output of the 3.0-litre turbocharged inline-six by 35 hp (26 kW), to 355 hp (265 kW).

== Alpina version ==
The Alpina B3 (F30) was based on the F30 3 Series, and was produced between 2013 and 2019.

== Model year changes ==
=== 2013 ===
- All-wheel drive became available for the wagon body style in the 320i, 328i and 335i models.

=== 2014 ===
- 328d is the first four-cylinder diesel BMW to be sold in the United States. The built in iDrive infotainment system software was also redesigned with new navigation and connectivity features.

=== 2015 Facelift (LCI) ===
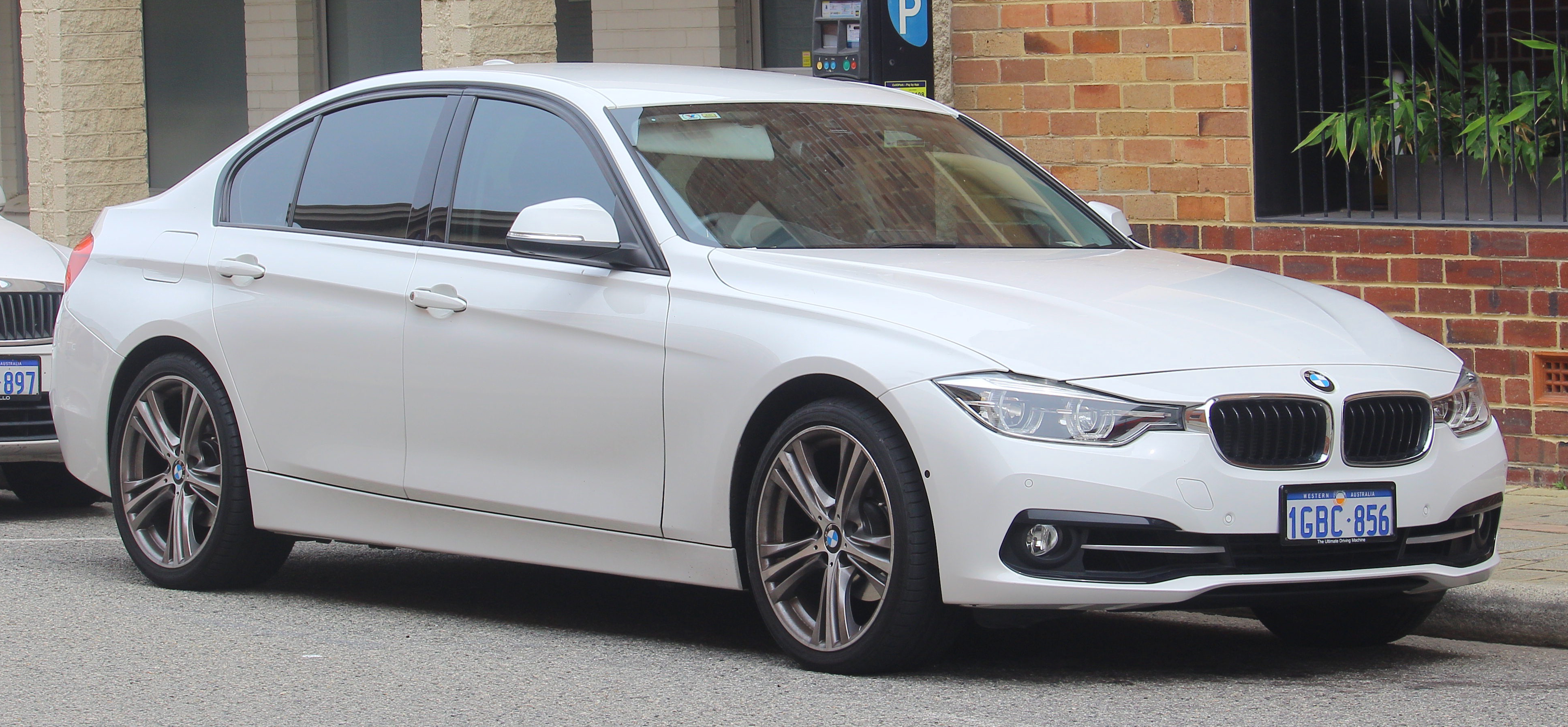
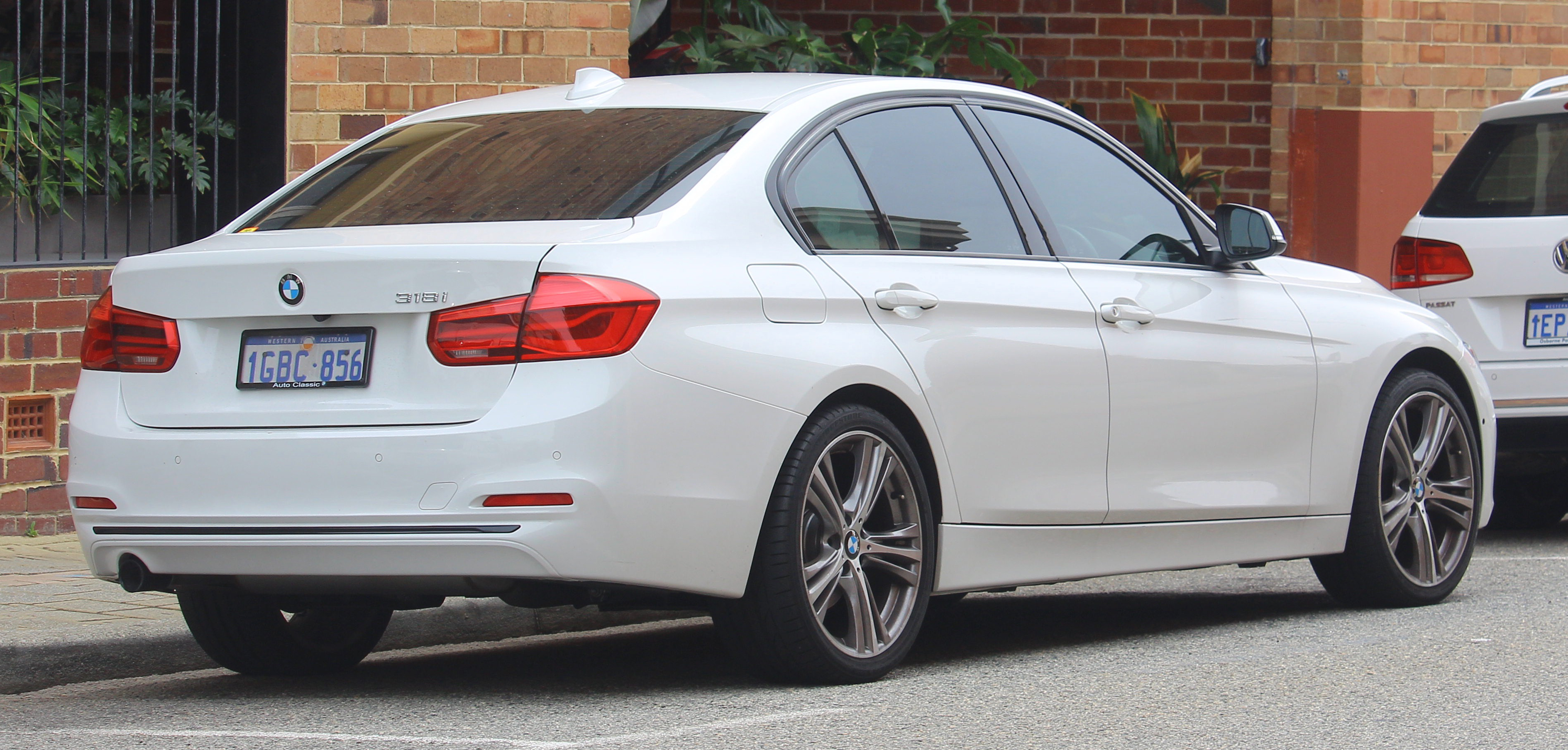
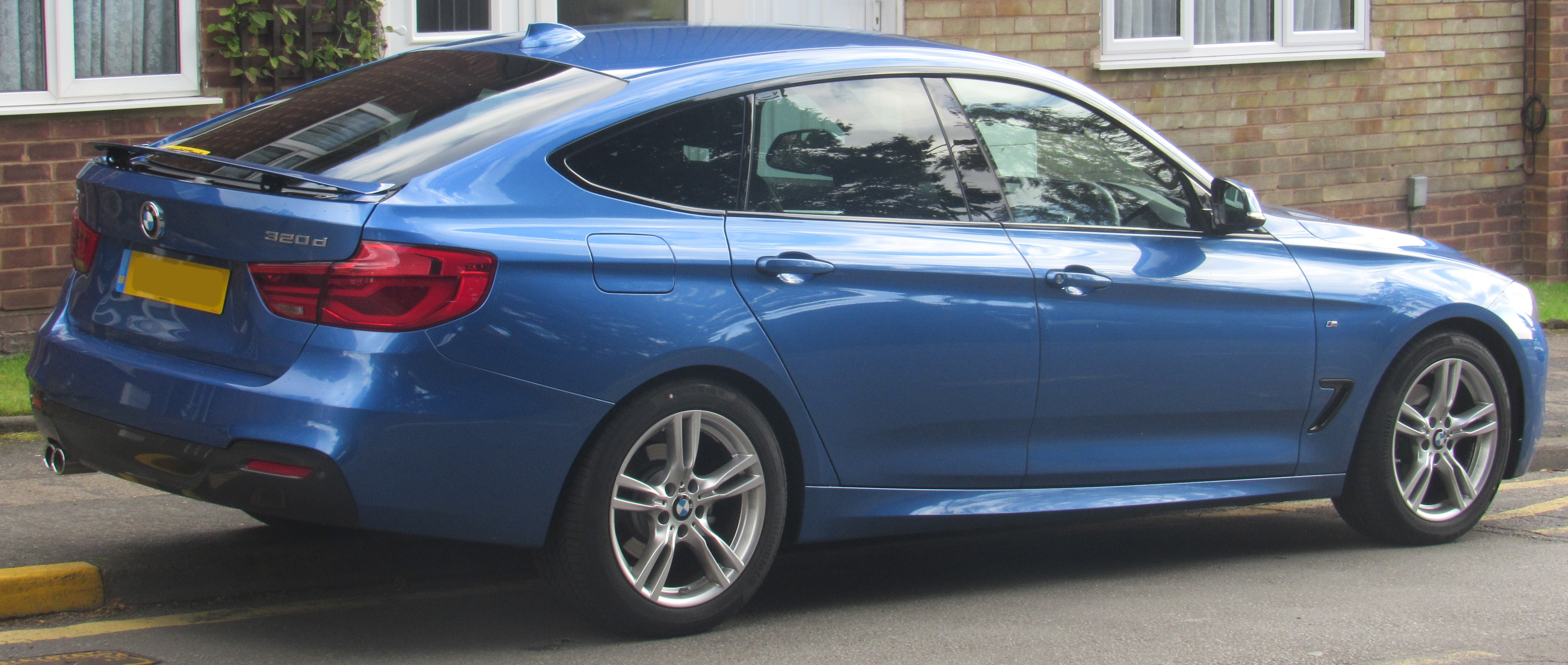
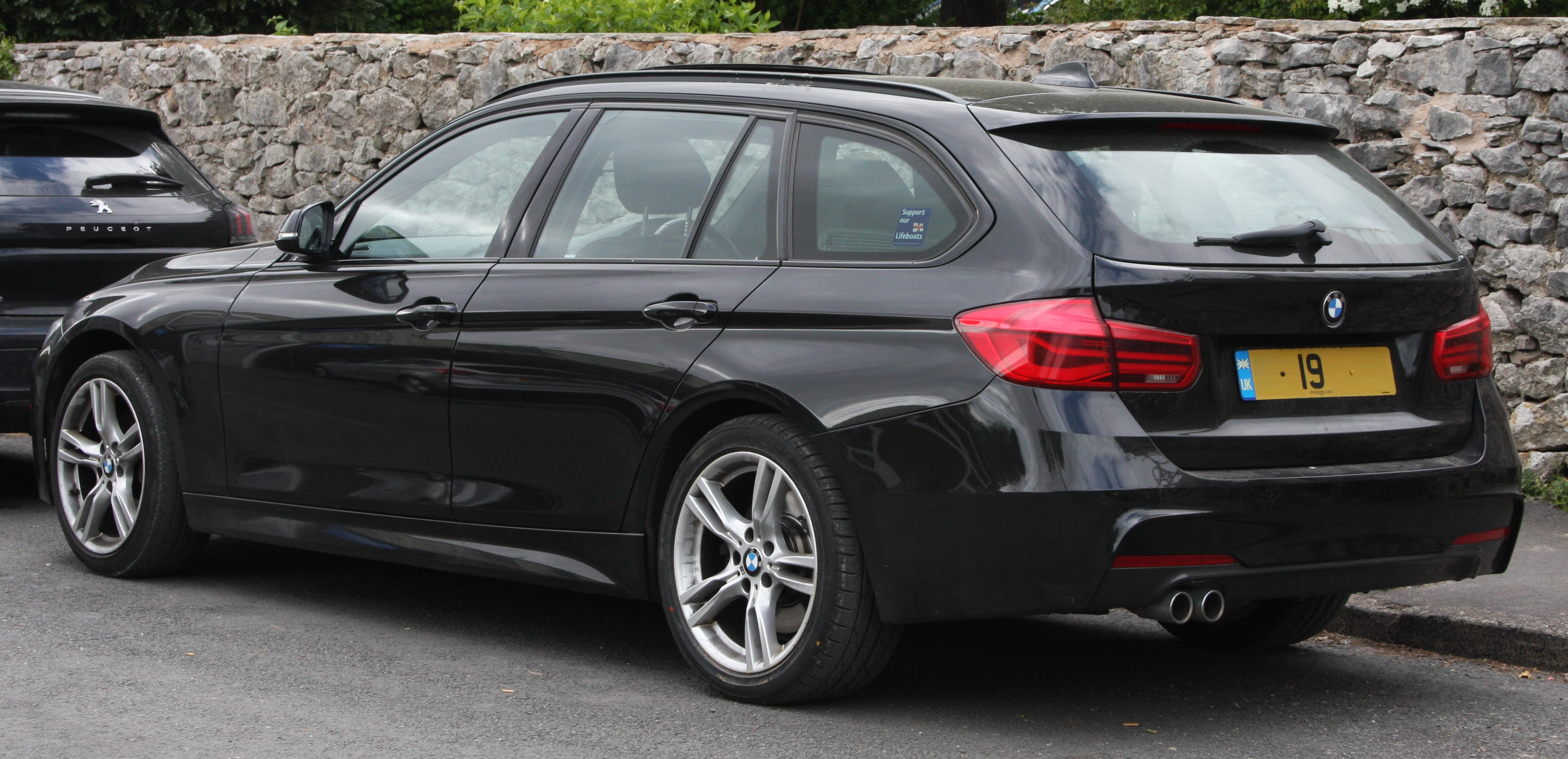

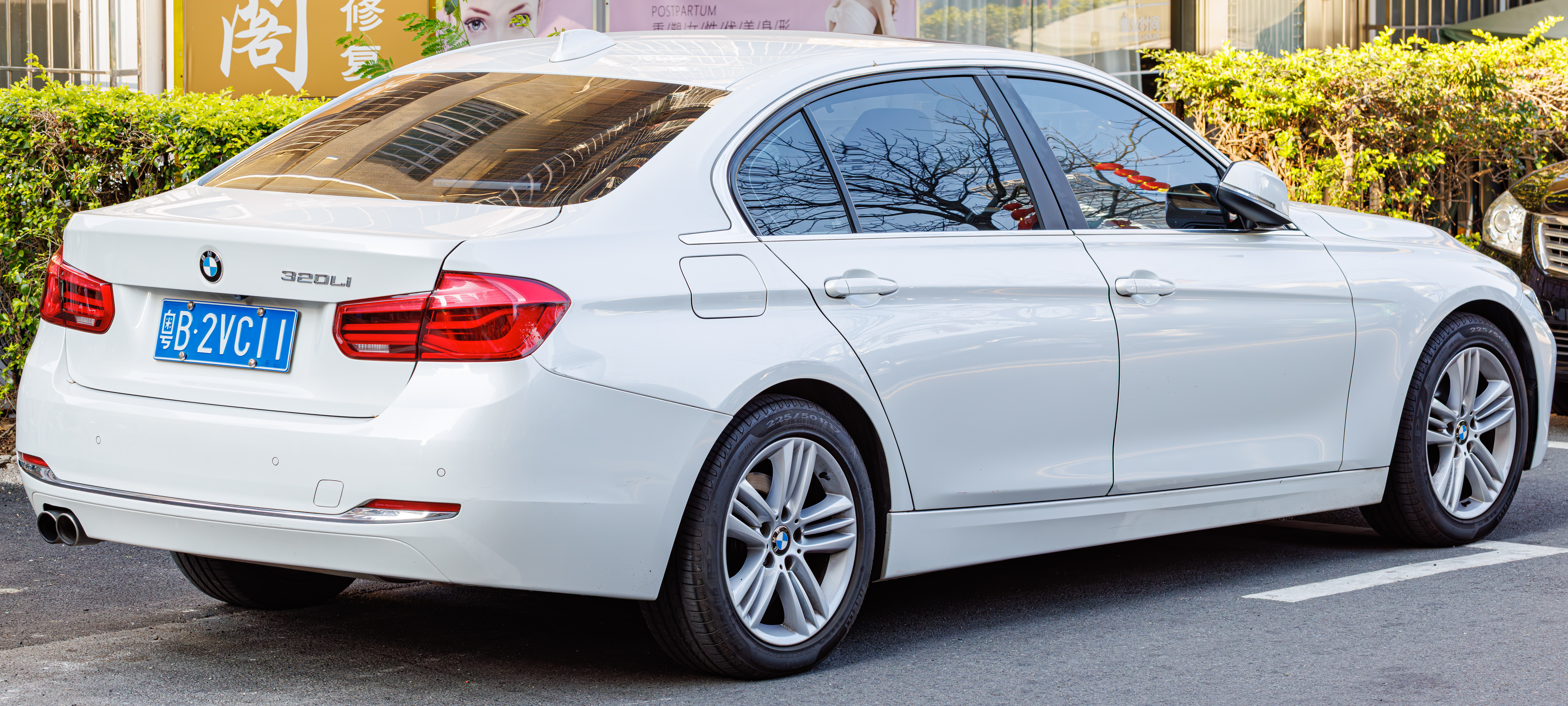
Post-facelift

The facelift ("Life Cycle Impulse") versions were released in 2015 for the 2016 model year. Changes include:

- 340i models (using the B58 engine) replace the 335i models (using the N55 engine).
- 330i model (using the B48 engine) replaces the 328i model (using the N20 engine), except for the United States market.
- 320i engine changes to B48 from N20, except for the United States market.
- 318i model (using the 3-cylinder B38 engine) replaces the 316i and 320i ED (using the 4-cylinder N13 engine) (therefore, for the first time in its 40-year history, the 318i model isn't powered by a 4-cylinder engine).
- B47 engine replaces the N47 engine for the 4-cylinder diesel models.
- ActiveHybrid 3 model discontinued.
- 330e iPerformance plug-in hybrid model added.
- Revised headlights and tail-lights, with LED replacing Xenon for the headlights.
- Revised shock absorbers and front suspension mounts.
- Revised electronic stability control (called "DSC" by BMW).
- Rev-matching (called "engine speed adaption" by BMW) for manual transmissions.
- GPS-based gear selection (called "ConnectedShift" by BMW) for automatic transmissions.
- Bluetooth audio streaming (A2DP) was added as standard equipment to the audio system.

== Safety ==
=== ANCAP ===
ANCAP test results* BMW 3 Series 320d variant (2012)
Test	Score
Overall	5 /5 stars
Frontal offset	15.76/16
Side impact	16/16
Pole	2/2
Seat belt reminders	3/3
Whiplash protection	Good
Pedestrian protection	Good
Electronic stability control	Standard

=== Euro NCAP ===
Euro NCAP test results* BMW 3 Series (2012)
Test	Points	%
Overall:	5 /5 stars	
Adult occupant:	34	95%
Child occupant:	41	84%
Pedestrian:	28	78%
Safety assist:	6	86%

=== IIHS ===
IIHS scores
Small overlap frontal offset (2011 – Nov 16)	Marginal
Small overlap frontal offset (Nov 2016–19)	Good
Moderate overlap frontal offset	Good
Side impact	Good
Roof strength	Good
Headlights
Halogen	Poor
LED	Poor
Adaptive LED	Acceptable

=== NHTSA ===
2013 328i sedan NHTSA scores
Overall:	5/5 stars
Frontal Driver:	4/5 stars
Frontal Passenger:	5/5 stars
Side Driver:	5/5 stars
Side Passenger:	5/5 stars
Side Pole Driver:	5/5 stars
Rollover:	5/5 stars

=== ASEAN NCAP ===
ASEAN NCAP test results BMW 318i (2019)
Test	Points
Overall:	5 /5 stars
Adult occupant:	48.92
Child occupant:	18.38
Safety assist:	14.58

== Marketing ==
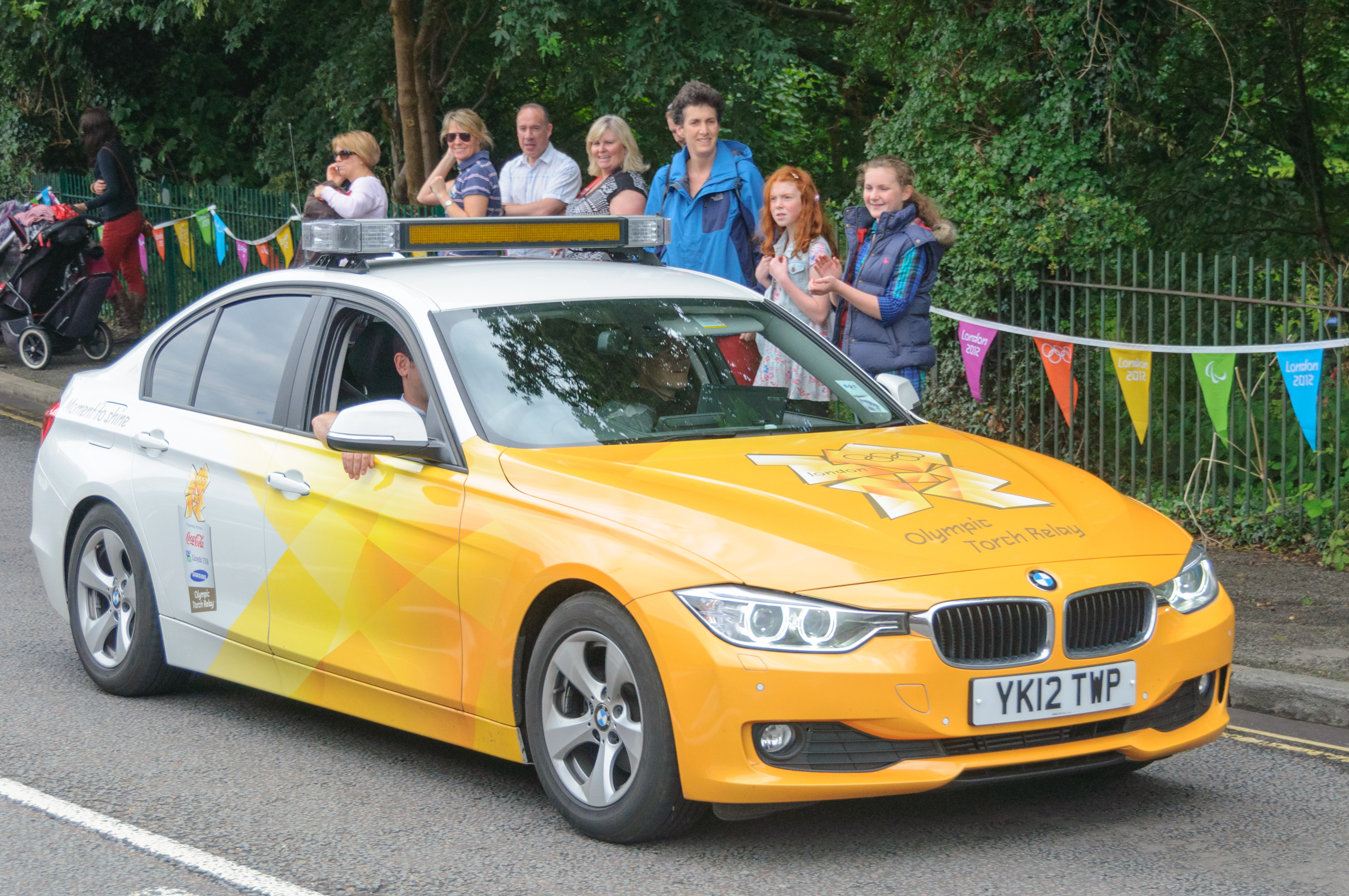
The 320d Efficient Dynamics at the 2012 London Olympics

The BMW 320d Efficient Dynamics was the most widely used vehicle in the London 2012 Olympics due to BMW's official partnership.

== Production ==
Production of F30 generation began with the sedan body style on 28 October 2011. Production ended in 2019 with the end of F31 Touring production in June.

The sedan and wagon models were produced in Germany (Munich and Regensburg), South Africa (Rosslyn, up until 2018), India (Chennai), China (Shenyang),Brazil (Araquari) and Russia (Kaliningrad). The Gran Turismo models were produced at the BMW Dingolfing plant in Germany. Local assembly of complete knock-down (CKD) kits was used for cars sold in Egypt, Indonesia, Malaysia, Russia and Thailand.

== Sales ==
The following are the sales of the 3 Series, according to BMW's annual reports:

Year	Total
2012	406,752
2013	500,332
2014	480,214
2015	444,338
2016	411,844
2017	409,005
Total:	2,652,485

== See also ==
- List of BMW vehicles
