= BMW 7 Series (F01) =

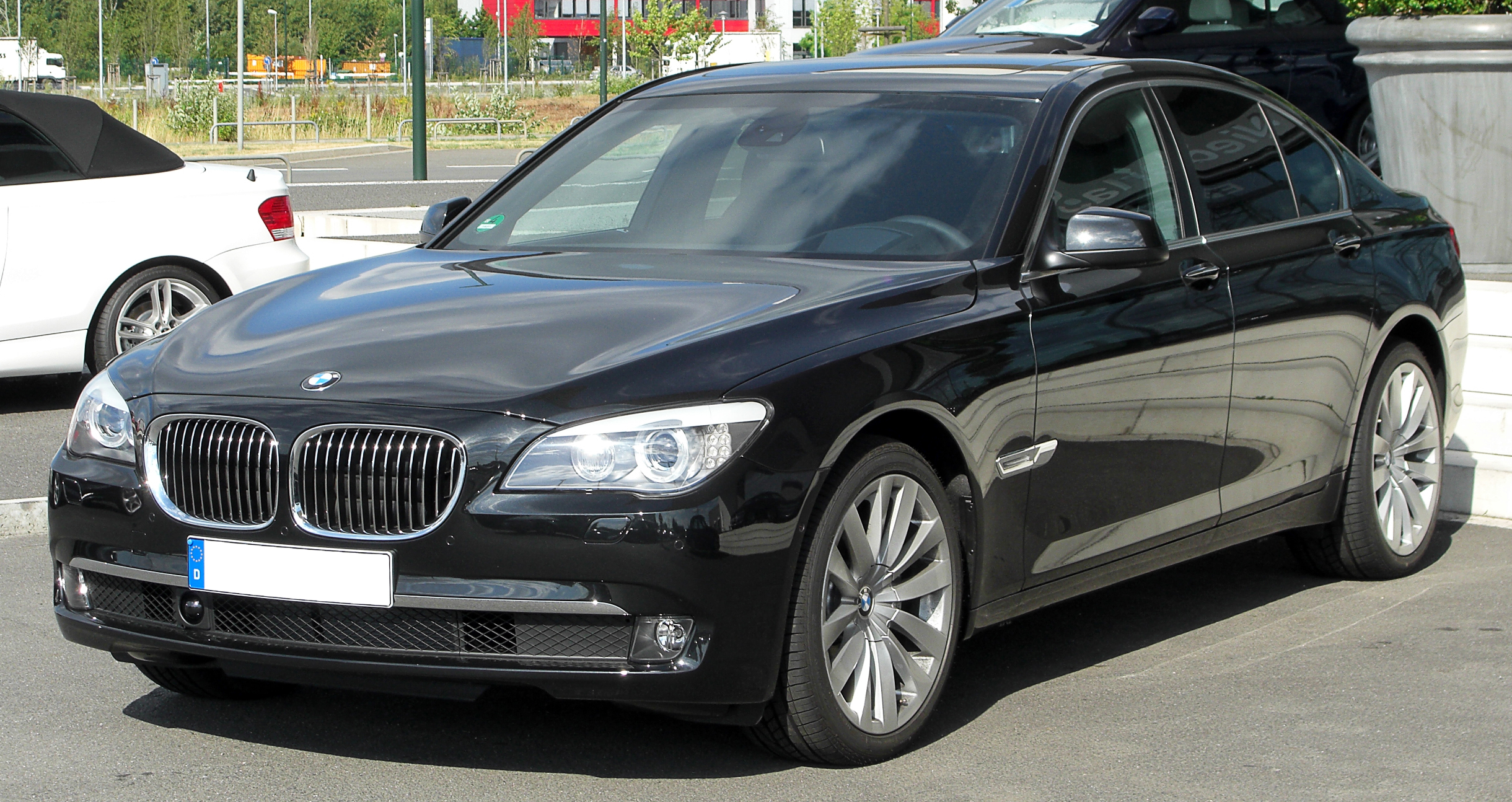

Overview
- Manufacturer: BMW
- Model code: F01 (short-wheelbase); F02 (long-wheelbase); F03 (high-security); F04 (ActiveHybrid)
- Production: 2008–2015
- Assembly: Germany: Dingolfing; Russia: Kaliningrad; Thailand: Rayong; Egypt: 6th of October City; India: Chennai
- Designer: Karim Habib

Body and chassis
- Class: Full-size luxury car (F)
- Body style: 4-door sedan
- Layout: Front-engine, rear-wheel-drive; Front-engine, all-wheel-drive (xDrive)
- Platform: BMW L6
- Related: Rolls-Royce Ghost; BMW 5 Series (F10); BMW 6 Series (F12); Rolls-Royce Wraith (2013); Rolls-Royce Dawn

Powertrain
- Engine: Petrol: 3.0 L N52 I6; 3.0 L N54 twin-turbo I6; 3.0 L N55 turbo I6; 4.4 L N63 twin-turbo V8; 6.0 L N74 twin-turbo V12; Petrol hybrid: 3.0 L N55 turbo I6; 4.4 L N63 twin-turbo V8; Diesel: 3.0 L N57 turbo I6
- Electric motor: 3-phase synchronous electric motor
- Transmission: 6-speed ZF automatic transmission 8-speed ZF automatic transmission
- Hybrid drivetrain: Parallel Hybrid (ActiveHybrid 7)

Dimensions
- Wheelbase: SWB: 3,070 mm (120.9 in); LWB: 3,210 mm (126.4 in)
- Length: SWB: 5,072 mm (199.7 in); LWB: 5,212 mm (205.2 in)
- Width: 1,902 mm (74.9 in)
- Height: 1,478–1,486 mm (58.2–58.5 in)
- Curb weight: 1,955–2,274 kg (4,310–5,013 lb)

Chronology
- Predecessor: BMW 7 Series (E65)
- Successor: BMW 7 Series (G11)

The fifth generation of the BMW 7 Series was manufactured and marketed by BMW from 2008 to 2015 in two full-size luxury sedans configurations: F01 (short-wheelbase) and F02 (long-wheelbase) configurations. The fifth generation is informally referred to collectively as the F01.

The F01 was the first BMW with a hybrid drivetrain, 8-speed automatic transmission or turbocharged V12 engine. It was the second 7 Series marketed with a turbocharged petrol engine, after the European E23 745i), or all-wheel drive (marketed as xDrive). The wheelbase was increased by 8 cm over the outgoing 7 Series. BMW also marketed an F03 model as the "High Security 7 Series" armoured car as well as an F04 model as a "ActiveHybrid 7" hybrid-electric model.

In July 2015, BMW transitioned production from the F01 to the BMW 7 Series (G11).

== Development and launch ==
The car's exterior was designed by Karim Habib, retaining elements from its E65 7 Series predecessor. The headlamps were reminiscent to the E65 though smaller and the grille was both wider and larger, extending further into the front apron. The F01 7 Series was larger than its predecessor, adding 1.7 in (43.2 mm) to the overall length and 3.2 in (81.3 mm) to the wheelbase while gaining more weight.

BMW presented the F01 at Moscow's Red Square on 8 July 2008. Other launch events included the Paris Motor Show in October and the Los Angeles International Auto Show in November.

== Equipment ==
The F01 was available with rear-wheel steering (Integral Active Steering), all-wheel drive (xDrive), eight speed automatic transmission, pedestrian recognition for the night vision feature, blind spot monitoring, massage function for the rear seats and the radar cruise control system was now able to completely stop the car and accelerate from a standstill (Active Cruise Control with Stop and Go).

Side cameras were fitted in the front bumper to assist with merging and exiting narrow spaces. By combining these cameras with the front and rear cameras, the F01 can display a virtual overhead graphic of the car to assist with parking. The instrument cluster has an LCD backdrop (with the gauge needles and rings still present as physical objects), allowing various graphics to be shown. A lane departure warning system - as fitted to the E60 5 Series since 2007 - was also available for the first time in a 7 Series.

Departures from the non-traditional interior design of the E65 include the transmission shifter being relocated to the centre console (previously a stalk on the steering column) and the seat controls being relocated to the outside edge of the seat base (previously located in the centre console).

== Engines ==
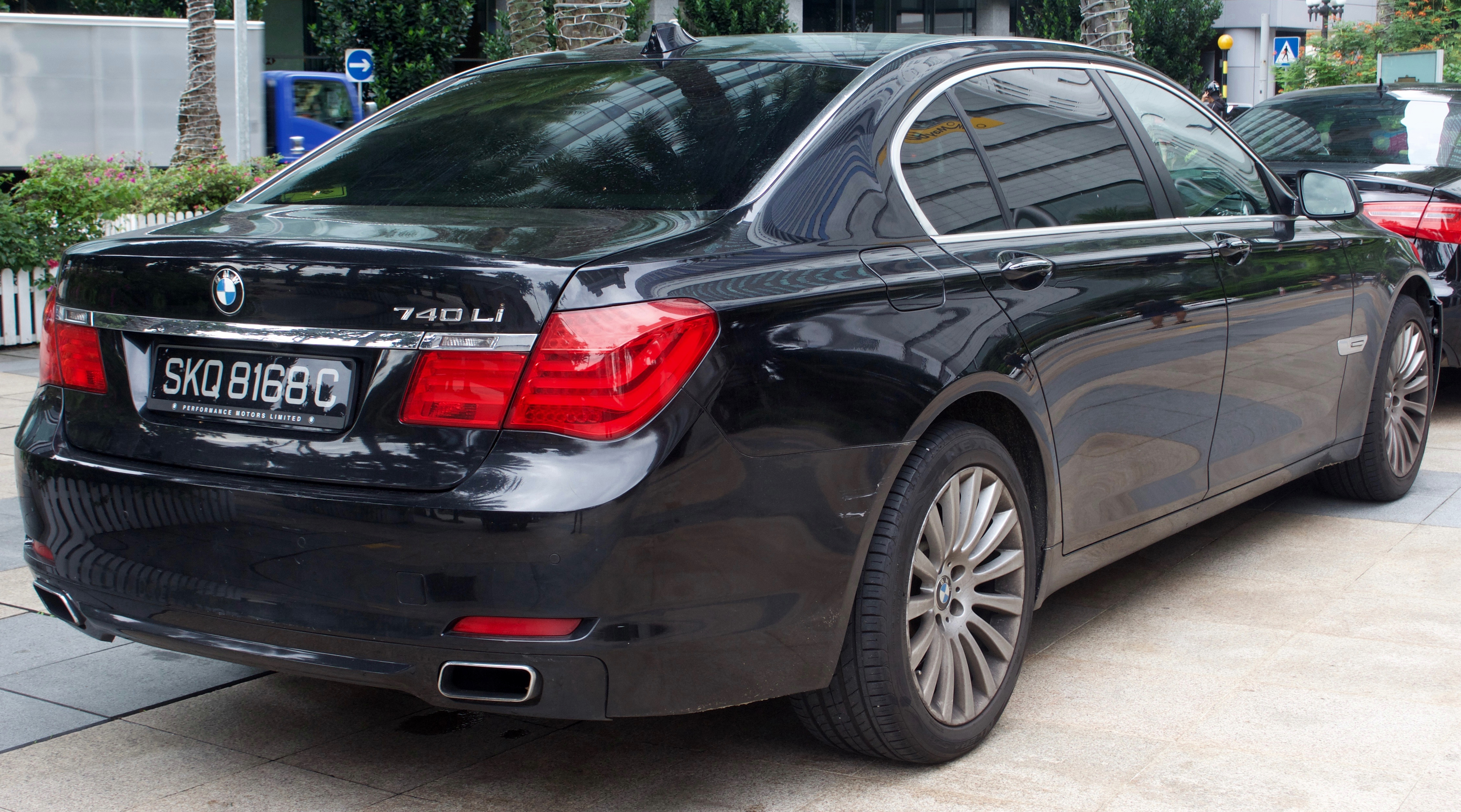
740Li LWB (pre-facelift)

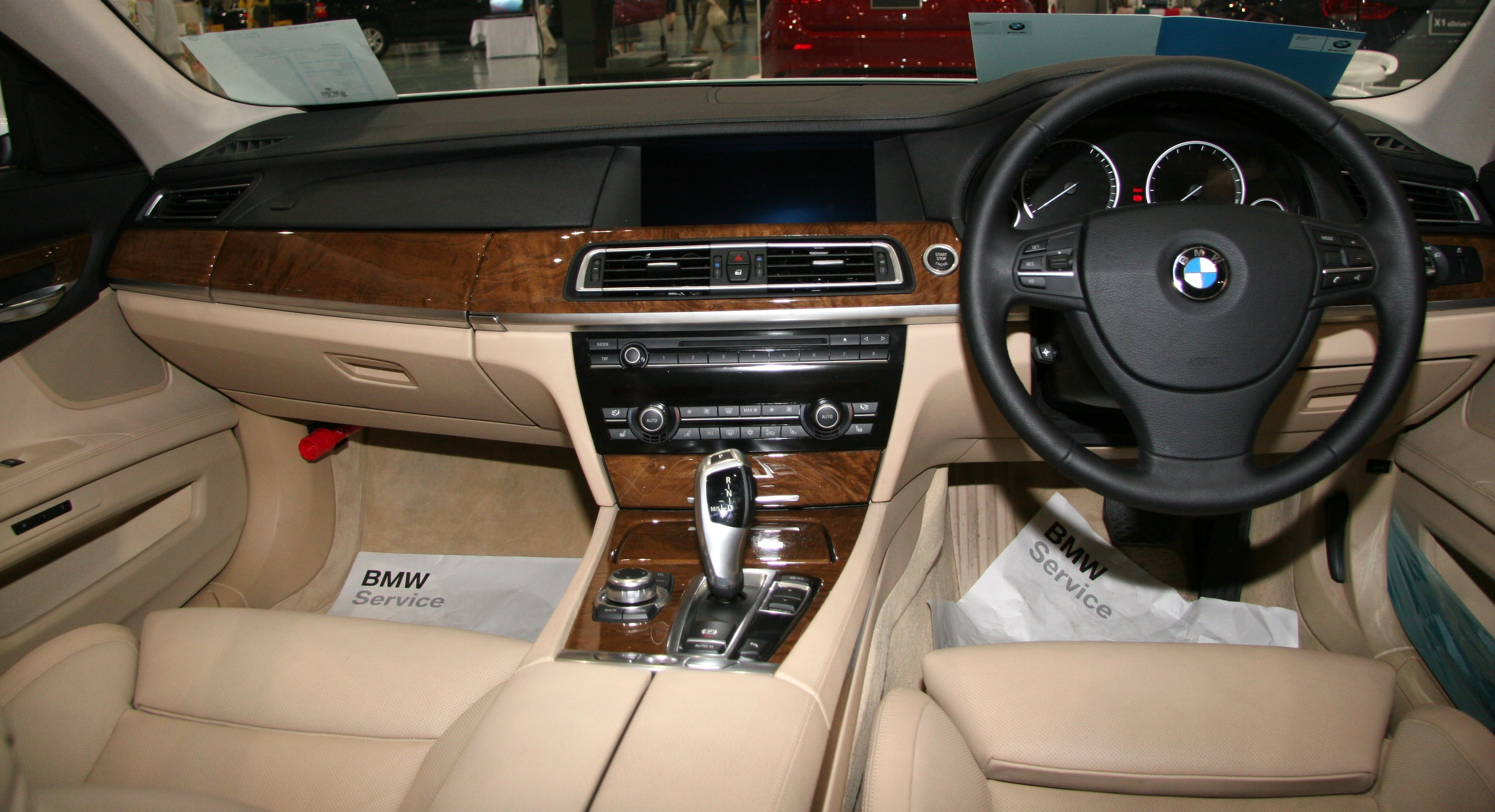
Interior

Official specifications are as follows.

=== Petrol engines ===
Model	Years	Engine	Power	Torque	Top speed
730i/Li	2009–2015	3.0 L N52; N.A. I6	190 kW (255 hp) at 6,600 rpm	310 N⋅m (229 lb⋅ft) at 2,600 rpm	245 km/h (152 mph)
740i/Li	2008–2012	3.0 L N54 twin-turbo I6	240 kW (322 hp) at 5,800 rpm	450 N⋅m (332 lb⋅ft) at 1,500–4,500 rpm	250 km/h (155 mph)*
740i/Li	2012–2015	3.0 L N55 turbo I6	235 kW (315 hp) at 5,800 rpm	450 N⋅m (332 lb⋅ft) at 1,300–4,500 rpm	250 km/h (155 mph)*
750i/Li	2008–2012	4.4 L N63 twin-turbo V8	300 kW (402 hp) at 6,400 rpm	600 N⋅m (443 lb⋅ft) at 1,750–4,500 rpm	250 km/h (155 mph)*
750i/Li	2012–2015	4.4 L N63 twin-turbo V8	331 kW (444 hp) at 6,000 rpm	650 N⋅m (479 lb⋅ft) at 2,000–4,500 rpm	250 km/h (155 mph)*
760i/Li**	2009–2015	6.0 L N74 twin-turbo V12	400 kW (536 hp) at 5,250 rpm	750 N⋅m (553 lb⋅ft) at 1,500–5,000 rpm	250 km/h (155 mph)*
ActiveHybrid7	2010–2012	4.4 L N63 twin-turbo V8	331 kW (444 hp) at 6,000 rpm	650 N⋅m (479 lb⋅ft) at 2,000–4,500 rpm	250 km/h (155 mph)*
ActiveHybrid7	2010–2012	electric motor	15 kW (20 hp)	210 N⋅m (155 lb⋅ft)	250 km/h (155 mph)*
ActiveHybrid7	2010–2012	combined	340 kW (456 hp)	700 N⋅m (516 lb⋅ft)	250 km/h (155 mph)*
ActiveHybrid7	2012–2015	3.0 L N55 turbo I6	235 kW (315 hp) at 5,800 rpm	450 N⋅m (332 lb⋅ft) at 1,300–4,500 rpm	250 km/h (155 mph)*
ActiveHybrid7	2012–2015	electric motor	41 kW (55 hp)	210 N⋅m (155 lb⋅ft)	250 km/h (155 mph)*
ActiveHybrid7	2012–2015	combined	260 kW (349 hp)	500 N⋅m (369 lb⋅ft)	250 km/h (155 mph)*
Alpina B7	2010–2012	4.4 L N63 twin-turbo V8	373 kW (500 hp) at 5,500 rpm	700 N⋅m (516 lb⋅ft) at 3,000–4,750 rpm	302 km/h (188 mph)
Alpina B7	2012–2015	4.4 L N63 twin-turbo V8	397 kW (532 hp) at 6,250 rpm	730 N⋅m (538 lb⋅ft) at 2,800–5,000 rpm	312 km/h (194 mph)

* Top speed is electronically limited.
** The V12 engine for the F01 760i/Li was redesigned as a twin-turbocharged 6.0L (codenamed N74) in order to maintain a performance advantage over the 750i, which utilised a turbocharged V8 engine. In some markets, the V12 engine was only available in the long-wheelbase model.

=== Diesel engines ===
Model	Years	Engine	Power	Torque	Top speed
730d/Ld	2008–2012	3.0 L N57 turbo I6	180 kW (241 hp) at 4,000 rpm	540 N⋅m (398 lb⋅ft) at 1,750–3,000 rpm	245 km/h (152 mph)
730d/Ld	2012–2015	3.0 L N57 turbo I6	190 kW (255 hp) at 4,000 rpm	560 N⋅m (413 lb⋅ft) at 1,500–3,000 rpm	250 km/h (155 mph)
740d/Ld	2009–2012	3.0 L N57 twin-turbo I6	225 kW (302 hp) at 4,400 rpm	600 N⋅m (443 lb⋅ft) at 1,500–2,500 rpm	250 km/h (155 mph)*
740d/Ld	2012–2015	3.0 L N57 twin-turbo I6	230 kW (308 hp) at 4,300 rpm	630 N⋅m (465 lb⋅ft) at 1,500–2,500 rpm	250 km/h (155 mph)*
750d/Ld	2012–2015	3.0 L N57 tri-turbo I6	280 kW (375 hp) at 4,400 rpm	740 N⋅m (546 lb⋅ft) at 2,000–3,000 rpm	250 km/h (155 mph)*

* Top speed is electronically limited.

== Special Models ==
=== High Security (F03) ===
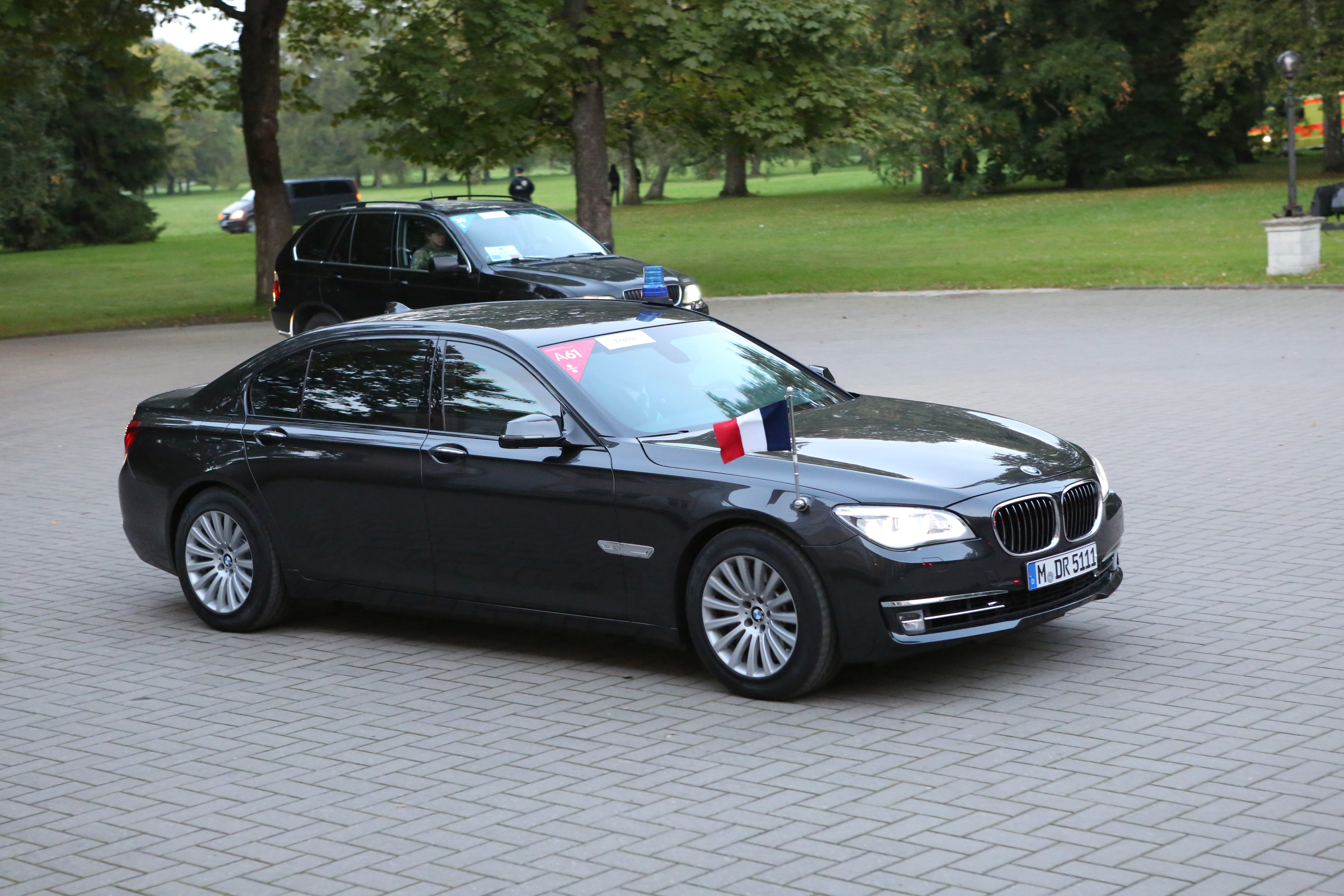
BMW 7 Series (F03)

The 750Li High Security and 760Li High Security models are the first cars to be certified with BRV 2009 and VR7 ballistics protection ratings. Security upgrades include undercarriage armour, 60 mm (2.4 in) thick multi-layer laminated glass and armour plating on the doors, roof, body pillars, front footwell and rear bulkhead. Due to the added weight of the security upgrades, suspension components such as the shock absorbers and strut tops were upgraded. Options included an intercom system between the passengers and the driver, an alarm, a fire extinguisher with temperature sensor, irritant gas sensors (to warn of dangerous gasses in the passenger area), a fresh-air supply system and a compartment for two machine guns in the centre console.

The High Security models were unveiled in GPEC 2012.

=== ActiveHybrid 7 (F04) (2010–2015) ===
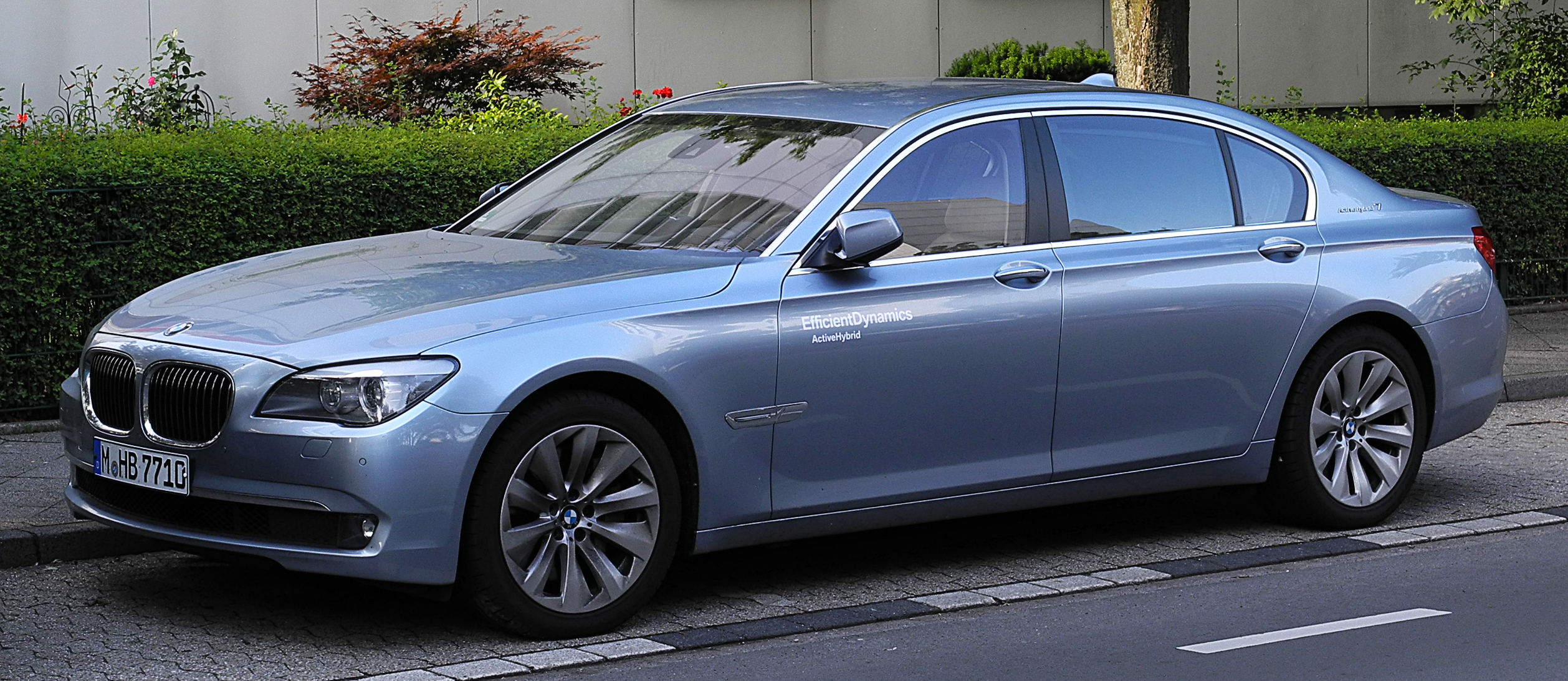
ActiveHybrid 7 - front

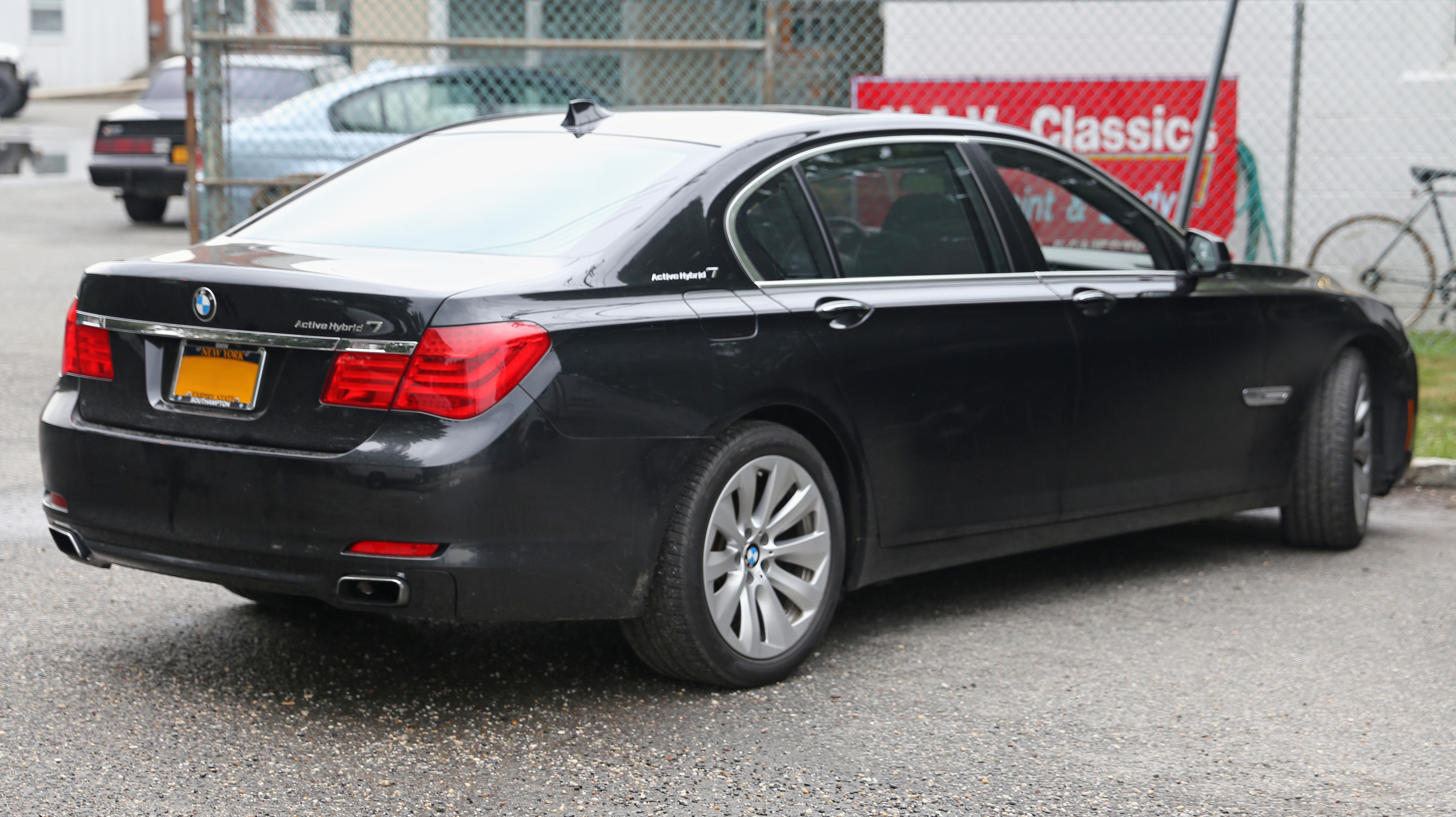
ActiveHybrid 7 - rear

The ActiveHybrid 7 was the first BMW vehicle to use a hybrid drivetrain. The concept was unveiled as the Concept 7 Series ActiveHybrid at the 2008 Paris Motor Show and the 2008 Los Angeles International Auto Show. The production version was unveiled at the 2009 Frankfurt Auto Show, and shown again later at the Monaco Yacht Show 2010.

The production version called the ActiveHybrid 7 uses the engine from the 750i plus an electric motor rated at 15 kW (20 hp) and 210 N⋅m (155 lb⋅ft) of torque. The electric motor is integrated into the transmission housing, replacing the alternator and the starter. The battery is a lithium-ion type and located under the boot floor. Other features include an auto start/stop system and an 8-speed automatic transmission. The hybrid system was based on the 2-mode hybrid from Daimler AG. The regenerative braking unit includes 12 V Absorbent Glass Mat batteries, running in parallel to a 120 V electrical network for electric motor. BMW claims it improved fuel consumption and reduced emissions by 15% over the non-hybrid model.

The wheelbase of the ActiveHybrid 7 is extended by 14 cm (5.5 in) and the car weighs 100 kg (221 lb) more than a regular 750i. The car's exterior profile was designed by Karim Habib, Team Leader, Advanced Design for BMW in Munich, Germany.

The fuel economy benefits of the ActiveHybrid 7 were questioned by reviewers, since the EPA consumption ratings of 17 mpg_{‑US} (13.8 L/100 km) city and 26 mpg_{‑US} (9.0 L/100 km) are not significantly better than the significantly cheaper 740i model's ratings of 17 mpg_{‑US} (13.8 L/100 km) city and 25 mpg_{‑US} (9.4 L/100 km) highway. The contemporary 740i was powered by a conventional petrol engine (the turbocharged N54 six-cylinder). The 740i has 108 kg (239 lb) less weight than the 750i over the front axle.

In late 2012, the ActiveHybrid 7's powertrain was significantly changed, switching from the 750i's turbocharged 4.4 litre V8 engine to the turbocharged 3.0 litre six-cylinder engine from the 740i. The electric motor was upgraded to 41 kW (55 hp). The 2012–2015 ActiveHybrid 7 was only available as a long-wheelbase model. Fuel economy was significantly improved for the updated drivetrain, which was rated at 22 mpg_{‑US} (10.7 L/100 km) city and 30 mpg_{‑US} (7.8 L/100 km) highway.

=== Alpina B7 ===
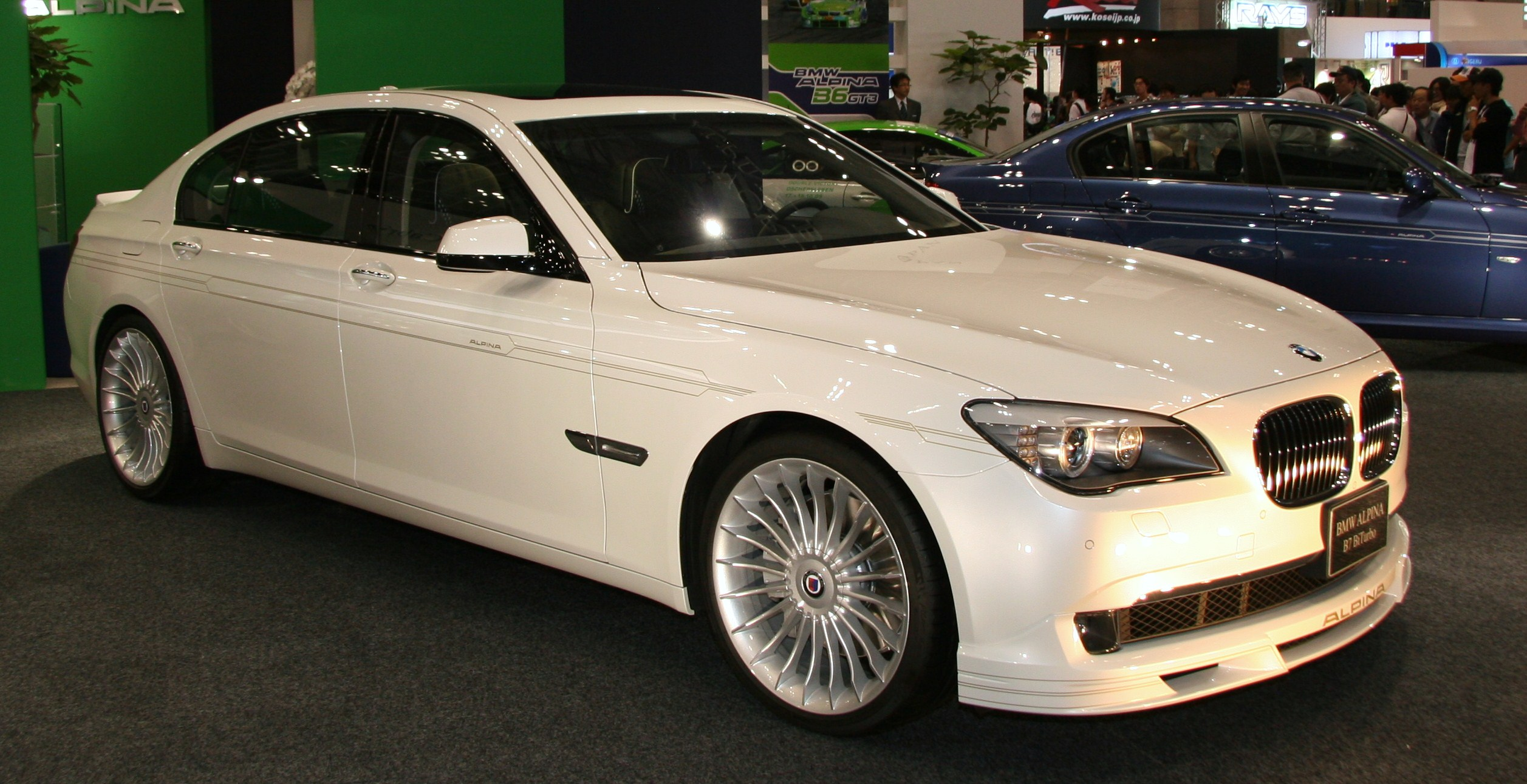
Alpina B7 BiTurbo (LWB)

The Alpina B7 is based on the 750i and began production for the 2011 model year. The vehicle was unveiled in 2010 Chicago Auto Show, and went on sale in Spring of 2010. Production version went on sale as 2011 model year vehicle. The Alpina B7's engine is assembled by hand at Alpina's facility in Buchloe, Germany, before being shipped to BMW for installation, and the assembled vehicle is then sent back to Alpina for finishing touches.

In the 2010–2012 B7, Alpina's variant of the N63 twin-turbocharged 4.4-litre V8 engine was rated at 373 kW (500 hp) and 700 N⋅m (516 lb⋅ft), with the same fuel economy figures as the regular 750i. Compared with the regular N63 engine, the Alpina variant includes high-performance pistons, strengthened cylinder heads, an additional radiator and external coolers for the engine oil and transmission oil. Larger and lighter turbochargers are fitted and boost pressure is increased from 0.8 bar (11.6 psi) to 1.0 bar (14.5 psi). The F01/F02 B7 marks the first time that BMW M and Alpina used the same type of forced-induction for their engines; Alpina's engine has less horsepower but more torque than the S63 variant used in the F10 M5.

The transmission is a ZF 6HP26 6-speed automatic with heavy-duty gears, and the B7 includes a strengthened drive shaft, differential and rear axles. The B7 also features a choice of regular or long-wheelbase and/or rear-wheel drive or xDrive.

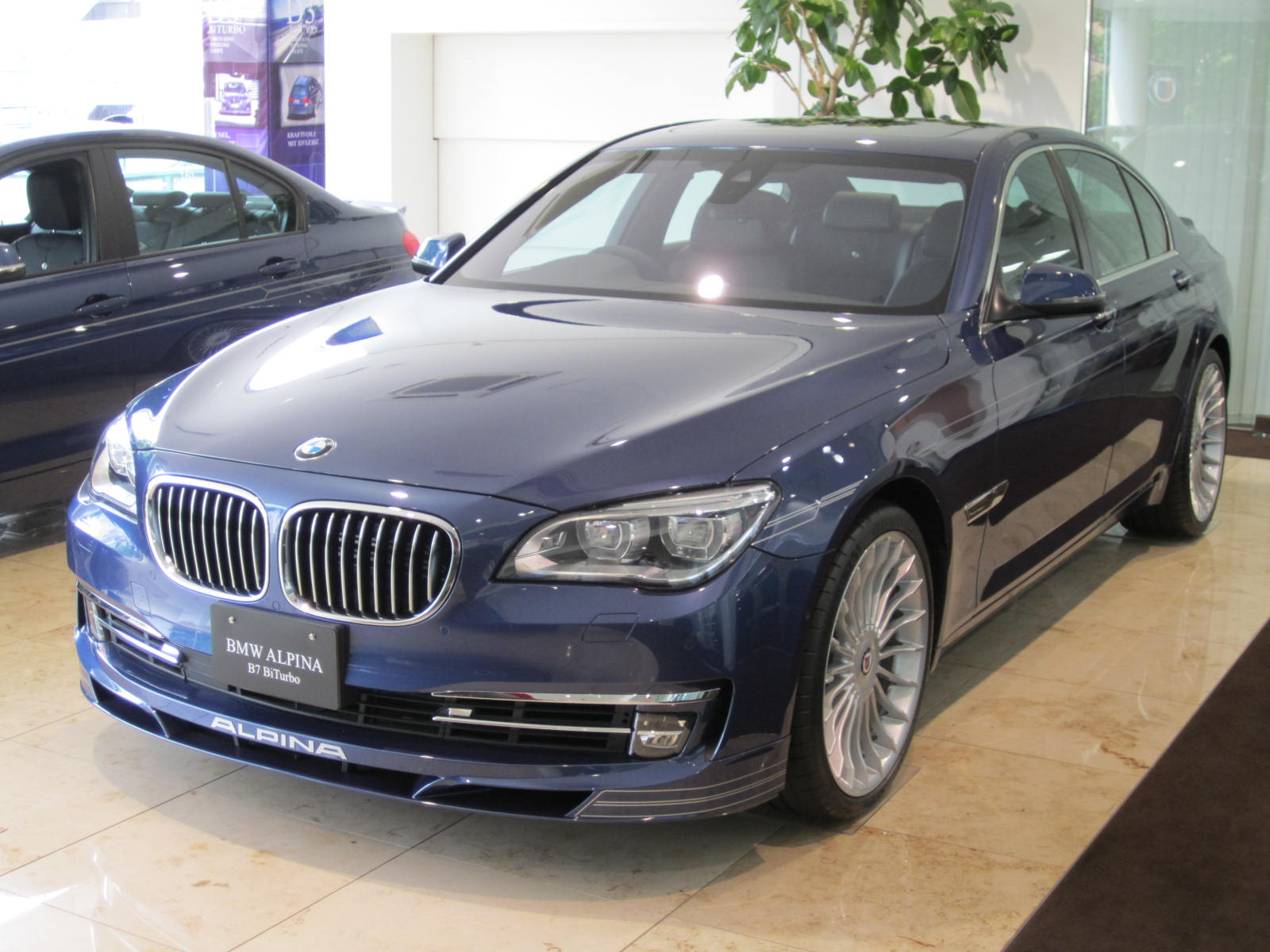
Alpina B7 (post-facelift)

In late 2012, the B7 received a mid-life update in line with other models of the 7 Series. The updated B7 was unveiled at the Pebble Beach Concours d'Elegance in August 2012 and went on-sale immediately thereafter. Power increased to 397 kW (532 hp), and top speed increased to 312 km/h (194 mph) (310 km/h (193 mph) on xDrive models).

In North America, the BMW Alpina B7 is officially sold by BMW and have BMW VINs, whereas the Alpina B7 BiTurbo sold in Europe and Japan are sold as vehicles manufactured by Alpina.

=== Prince Albert II limousine ===
In 2011, a limited production run (200 units) of BMW 7 Series limousines were supplied by BMW for the wedding of Albert II, Prince of Monaco, and Charlene Wittstock. The cars were based on the 740Li.

== Transmissions ==
The F01 was produced with the following transmissions:

- 6-speed automatic ZF 6HP 19
- 6-speed automatic ZF 6HP 26
- 8-speed automatic ZF 8HP 70
- 8-speed automatic ZF 8HP 90

All models from 2009 through 2012 were equipped with the 6-speed automatic transmission with Steptronic function, except for the 760i/Li which had the 8-speed automatic transmission with Steptronic. For the 2013-15 model years, all the other models received the 8-speed automatic transmission with Steptronic.

== Model year changes ==
Most changes occurred September of each year, when the changes for the following model year entered production, as is typical BMW practice. Thus, the 2009 changes represent changes for model year 2010, for example:

=== 2008 ===
- Launch model range consisted of petrol models 740i, 750i and 750Li, and the diesel 730d.

=== 2009 ===
- All-wheel drive became available for a 7 Series for the first time, in the form of the 750i xDrive and 750Li models.
- The V12-engined 760i/Li flagship models were added to the range.
- 740d model introduced in autumn.
- M Sport Package introduced.
- Sales began in the United States, initially with the 750i and 750Li models.
- Long-wheelbase 730Li model went on sale, for Asian markets only.

=== 2010 ===
- ActiveHybrid 7 and ActiveHybrid 7L models introduced. These initial hybrid models use a turbocharged 4.4 litre V8 engine with a 15 kW (20 hp) electric motor.
- 740d xDrive model introduced in September 2010.
- Optional comfort seats in the rear compartment became available in a three-seat version.
- Alpina B7 (rear-wheel drive) and B7X (all-wheel drive) models introduced.
- 740i and 740Li models became available in the United States, the first six-cylinder 7-Series to be sold in the United States since 1992.

=== 2013 facelift ===
The F01 facelift (also known as LCI) models began production in July 2012 and were sold as the 2013 model year cars. The facelift models were unveiled at the 2012 Pebble Beach Concours d'Elegance, and shown at the 2012 Monaco Yacht Show.

Changes include:

- 8-speed automatic transmission became standard equipment.
- ActiveHybrid 7 model switches from N63 V8 engine to N55 six-cylinder engine, and a more powerful electric motor was used.
- 750i/Li and Alpina B7 engine upgraded from N63 to N63TU (N63B44O1), which added variable valve lift ("Valvetronic").
- 740i/Li engine upgraded from N54 to N55, which added variable valve lift ("Valvetronic") and switched to a single twin-scroll turbocharger.
- 740i/Li became available with all-wheel drive (xDrive).
- 750d/Ld model introduced, powered by the triple-turbo N57S six-cylinder diesel engine.
- 730d and 740d/Ld engines upgraded from N57 to N57TU (N57D30O1), increasing output by up to 10 kW (13 bhp) and 20 N⋅m (15 lb⋅ft).
- 730i model discontinued.
- Full-LED headlamps.
- Revised kidney grille and front spoiler.
- Upgrade of the LCD dashboard's graphics ("Full Black Panel Display") and the gauge needles are now shown electronically, replacing the traditional physical needles. The information available to be displayed on the dashboard was increased.
- Self-levelling air suspension at the rear became standard.
- Night vision upgraded to include an automatic spotlight which targets pedestrians, to warn the driver about their presence ("Dynamic Light Spot").
- Automatic parking, where the car steers itself to parallel park ("BMW Parking Assistant").
- Driver drowsiness detection (marketed as Attention Assistant) added.
- Collision avoidance system (marketed as Active Protection) including collision detection, automatic pre-crash braking and automatic post-crash braking.
- Cruise control mode added for traffic jams, marketed as Enhanced Active Cruise Control.

=== 2013 ===
- 760i/760Li models become compliant with the Euro 6 emissions standard.
- For the USA only, fifteen "V-12 25th Anniversary Edition" cars were produced, to commemorating the 25th anniversary of BMW's V12 engines. The cars are based on the 760Li and include various exterior styling and interior options. The RRP for the model was $159,695.

Pre-facelift styling

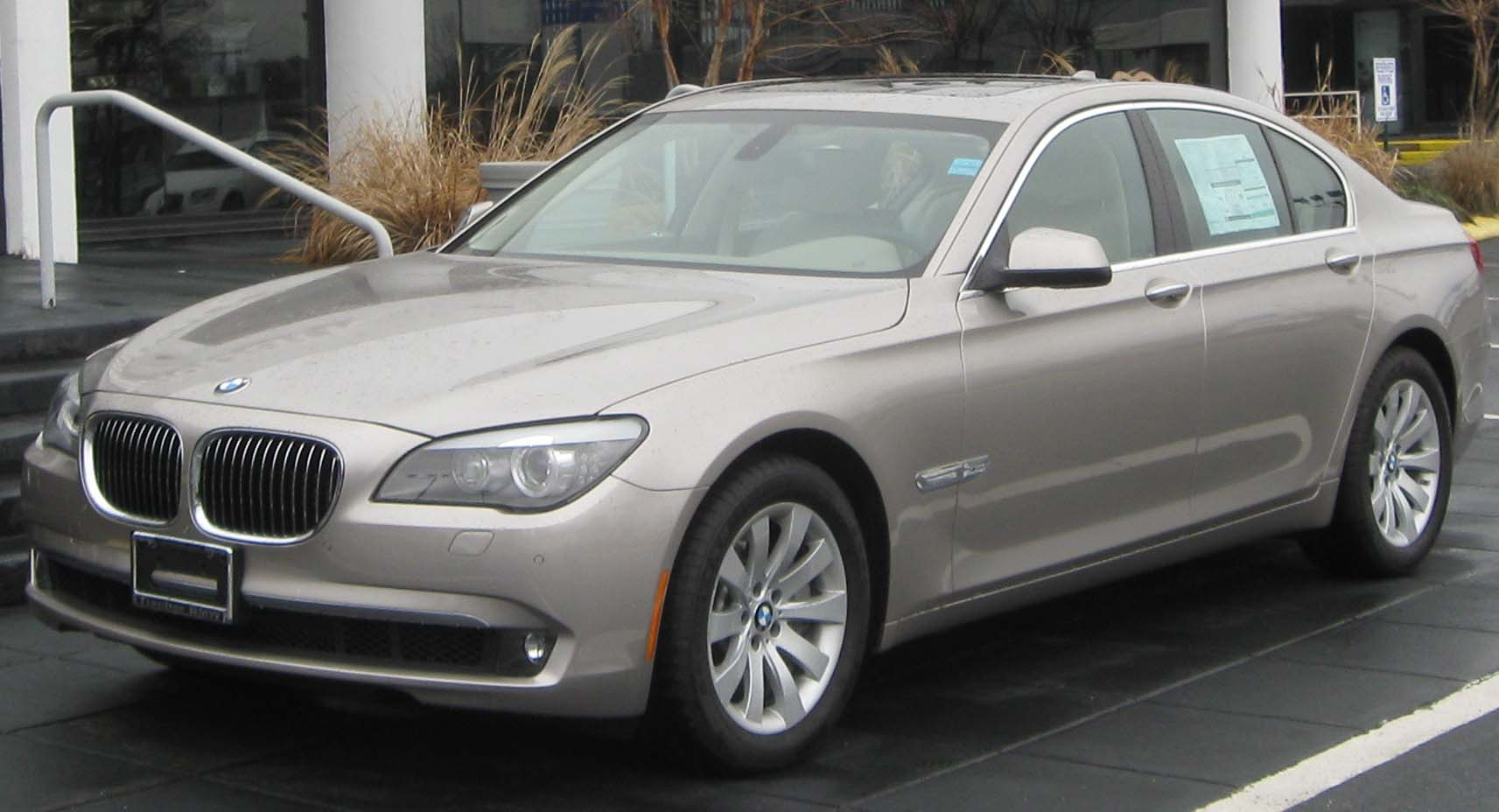
Front (750i)

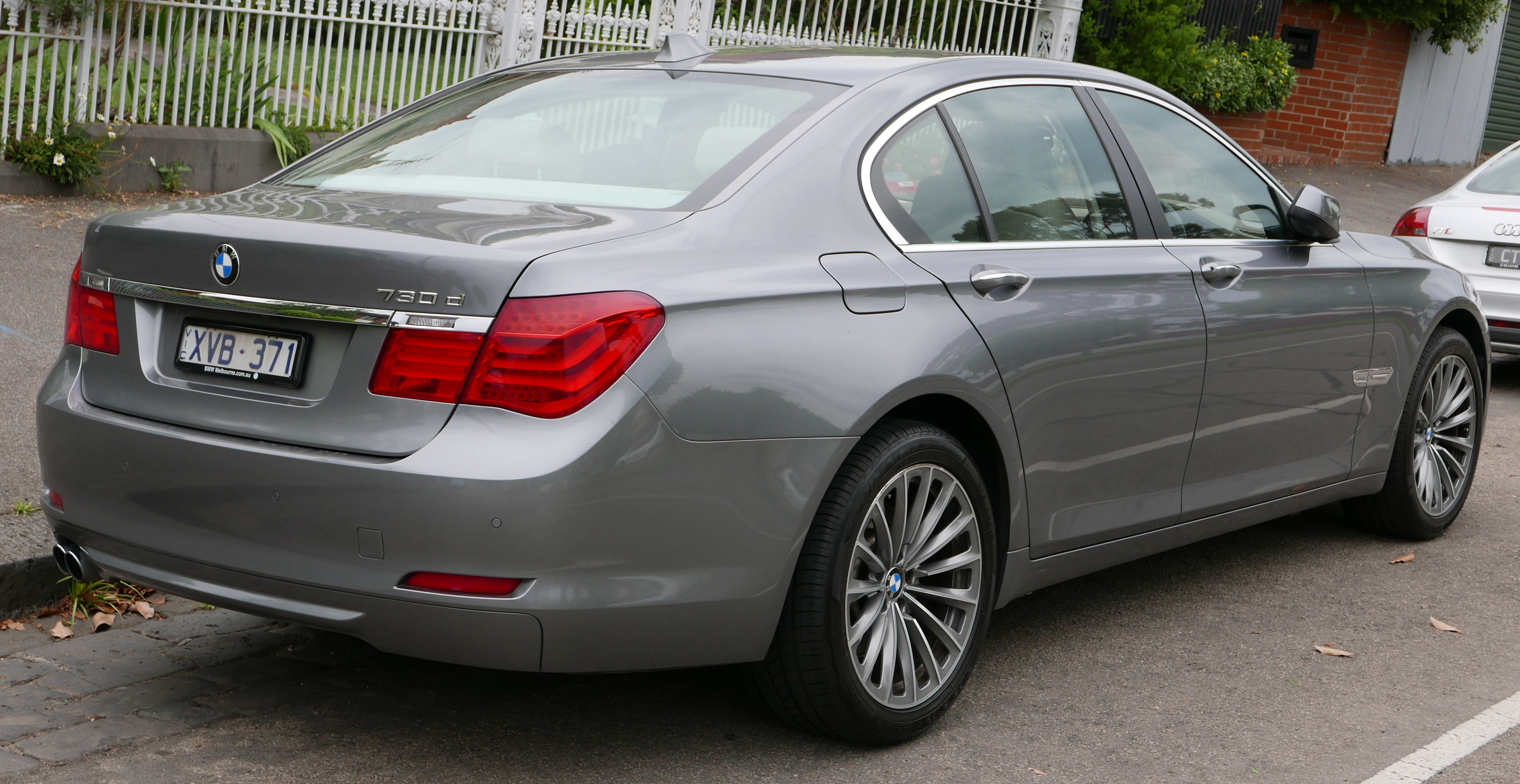
Rear (730d)

Post-facelift styling

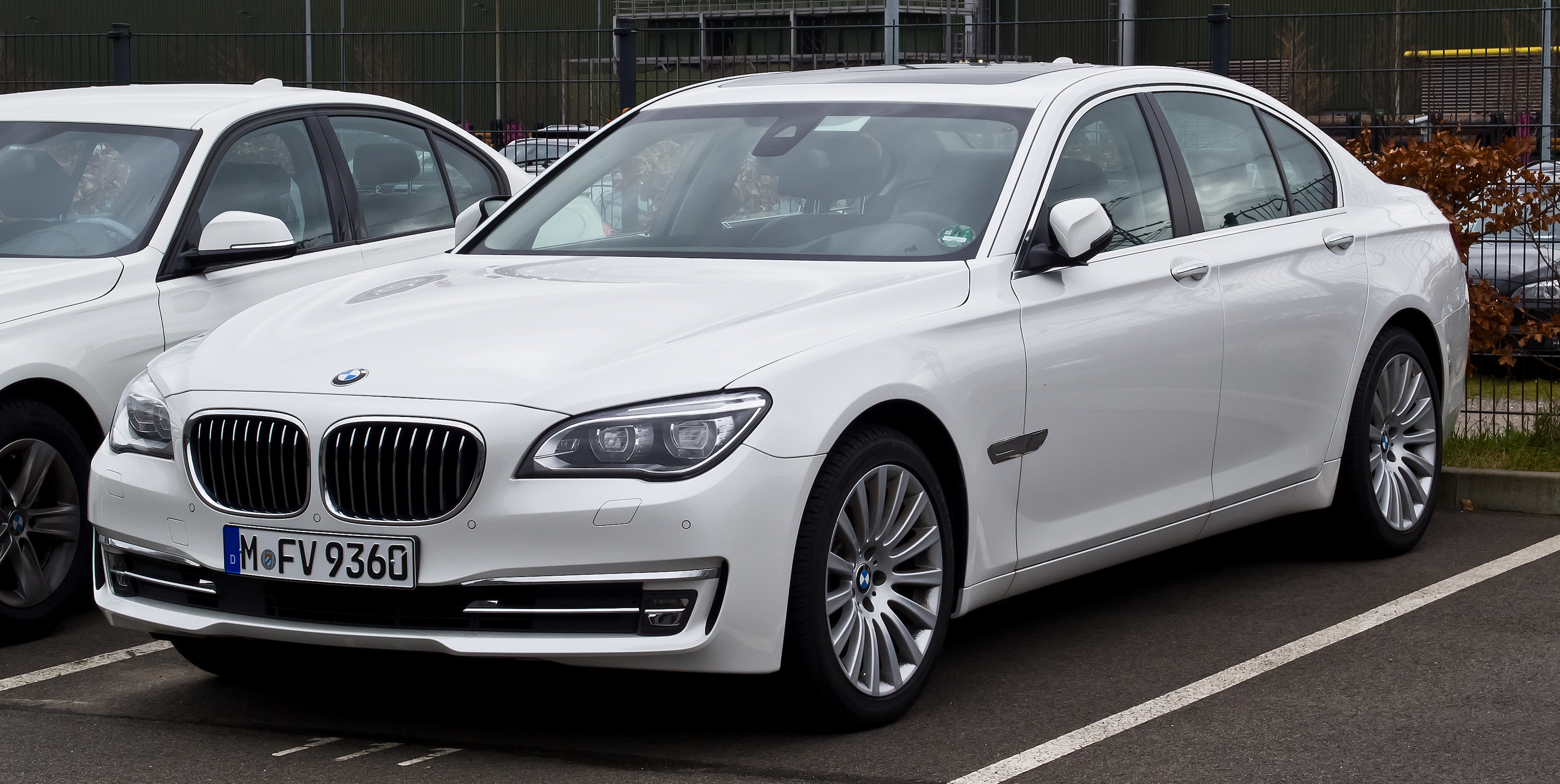
Front (730d xDrive)

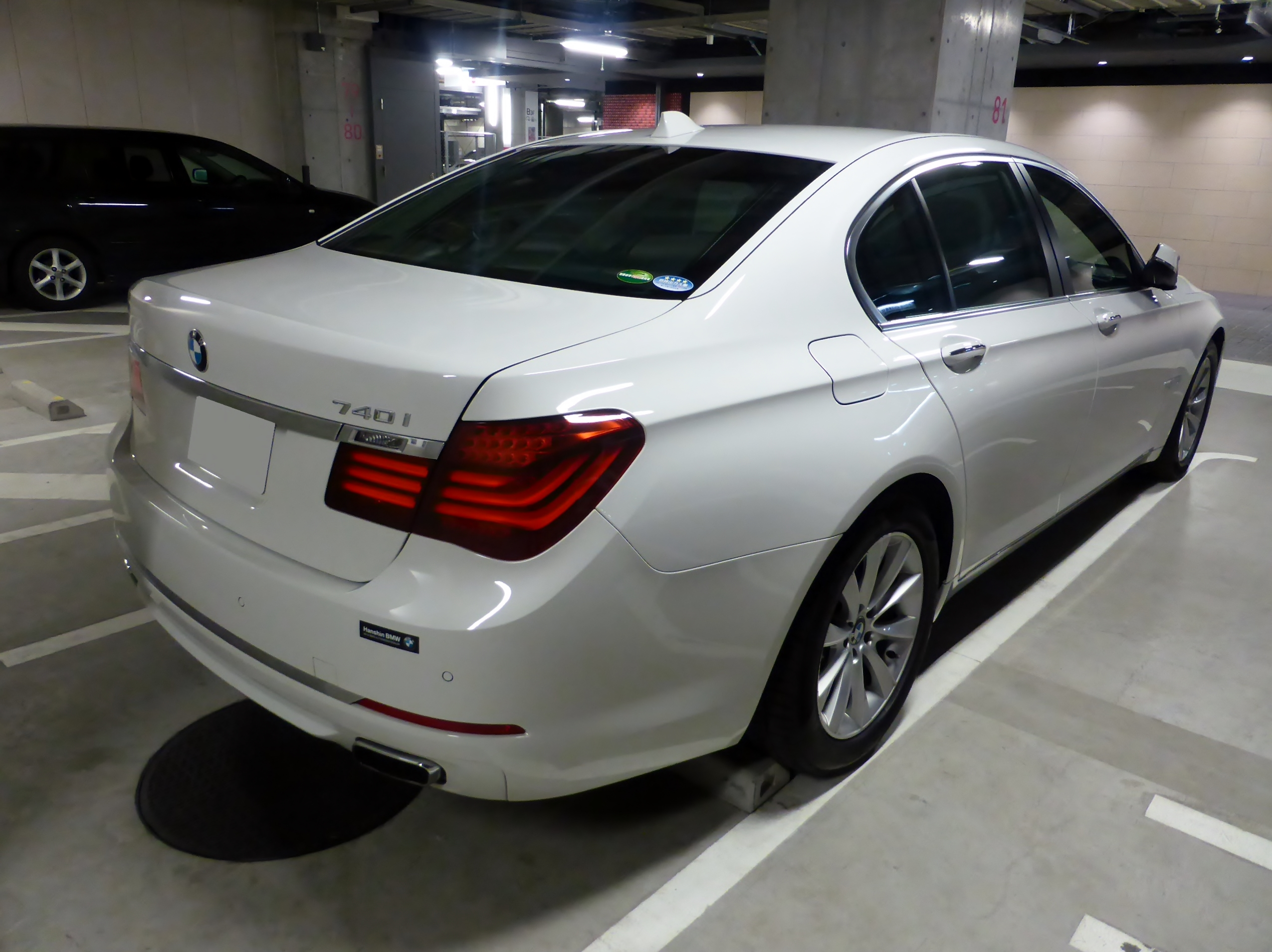
Rear (740i)

== Production ==
The 740i and 740Li made up 10% of overall 7 Series sales in the United States, while the 760Li had 2%. In the United States, 70% of the 7 Series cars sold are the "L" long-wheelbase models.

== Marketing ==
For the tenth anniversary of the Tate Modern, BMW provided Spanish artist Martí Anson with a 7 Series in which to chauffeur artists to the gallery, with the car parked in the gallery's Turbine Hall during the exhibition.

BMW Group Russia provided vehicles for opening night premieres for various plays at the Bolshoi Theatre from 2004. In 2011, twenty vehicles (consisting of F01 7 Series and the F07 5 Series GT) were provided for the re-opening of the theatre's historical stage.
