= BMW 4 Series (F32) =

First-generation of BMW 4 Series

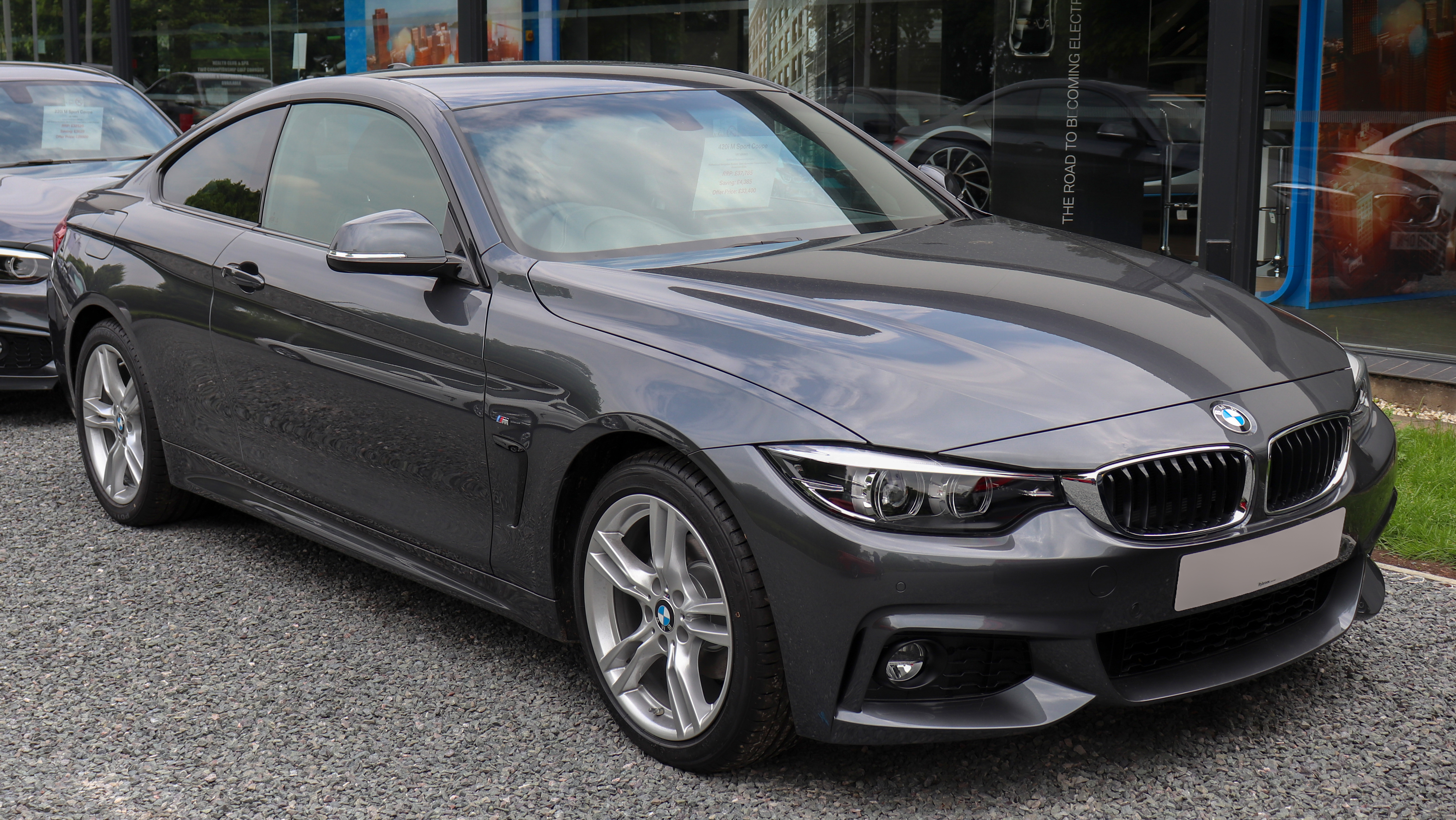
- Post-facelift coupé

Overview
- Manufacturer: BMW
- Model code: F32 (coupé); F33 (convertible); F36 (saloon)
- Production: July 2013 – September 2020
- Assembly: Germany: Dingolfing; Munich; Regensburg
- Designer: Per Ivar Selvaag (F32/F33); Nicolas Huet (F36)

Body and chassis
- Class: Compact executive car (D)
- Body style: 2-door coupé (F32); 2-door convertible (F33); 5-door liftback/fastback sedan (F36)
- Layout: Front-engine, rear-wheel-drive; Front-engine, four-wheel-drive (xDrive)
- Platform: BMW L7
- Related: BMW M4 (F82/F83); BMW 1 Series (F20); BMW 3 Series (F30); BMW 2 Series (F22)

Powertrain
- Engine: Petrol—turbocharged: 1.5 L B38 I3; 2.0 L N20/B48 I4; 3.0 L N55/B58/S55 I6; Diesel—turbocharged: 2.0 L N47/B47 I4; 3.0 L N57 I6

Dimensions
- Wheelbase: 2,810 mm (110.6 in)
- Length: 4,638 mm (182.6 in)
- Width: 1,825 mm (71.9 in)
- Height: 1,377–1,389 mm (54.2–54.7 in)
- Curb weight: 1,430–1,850 kg (3,153–4,079 lb)

Chronology
- Predecessor: BMW 3 Series (E92/E93)
- Successor: BMW 4 Series (G22)

The first generation of the BMW 4 Series consists of the BMW F32 (coupé version), BMW F33 (convertible version) and BMW F36 (five-door liftback version, marketed as 'Gran Coupé') compact executive cars. The F32/F33/F36 was produced from 2013 to 2020 and is often collectively referred to as the F32.

The F32 was introduced as the successor to the E92/E93 coupé/convertible models of the fifth-generation 3 Series range. The F32 is produced alongside - and shares many features with - the F30 3 Series. As with the F30 3 Series range, the F32/F33/F36 is powered by turbocharged petrol and diesel engines with three cylinders (petrol only), four cylinders, and six cylinders.

The high performance F82/F83 M4 models were introduced in early 2014. They are powered by the S55 turbocharged straight-six engine.

== Development and launch ==
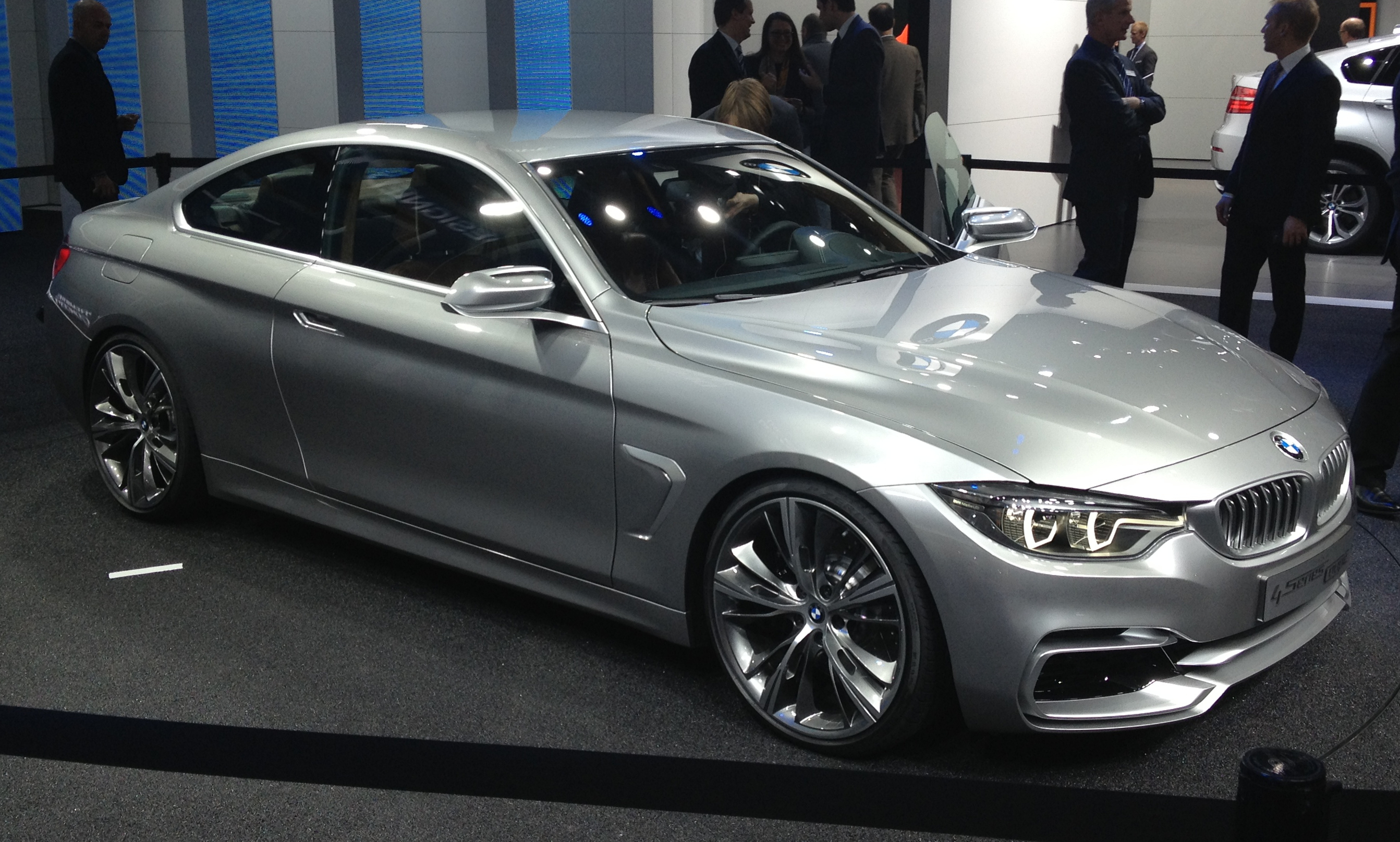
BMW Concept 4 Series Coupé at the 2013 North American International Auto Show

Official details of the "Concept 4 Series" were released in December 2012, detailing the intention to replace the E92 3 Series coupé with a new 4 Series line. In 2013, the concept vehicle (called the Concept 4 Series Coupé) was unveiled at the North American International Auto Show. The concept car was designed by Won Kyu Kang.

Compared with its E92 predecessor, the F32's wheelbase is 50 mm (2.0 in) longer, the overall length is increased by 31 mm (1.2 in) and the width is increased by 44 mm (1.7 in). The front track width is 1,545 mm (60.8 in) and the rear track width is 1,593 mm (62.7 in), increases of 45 mm (1.8 in) and 80 mm (3.1 in) respectively.

== Body styles ==
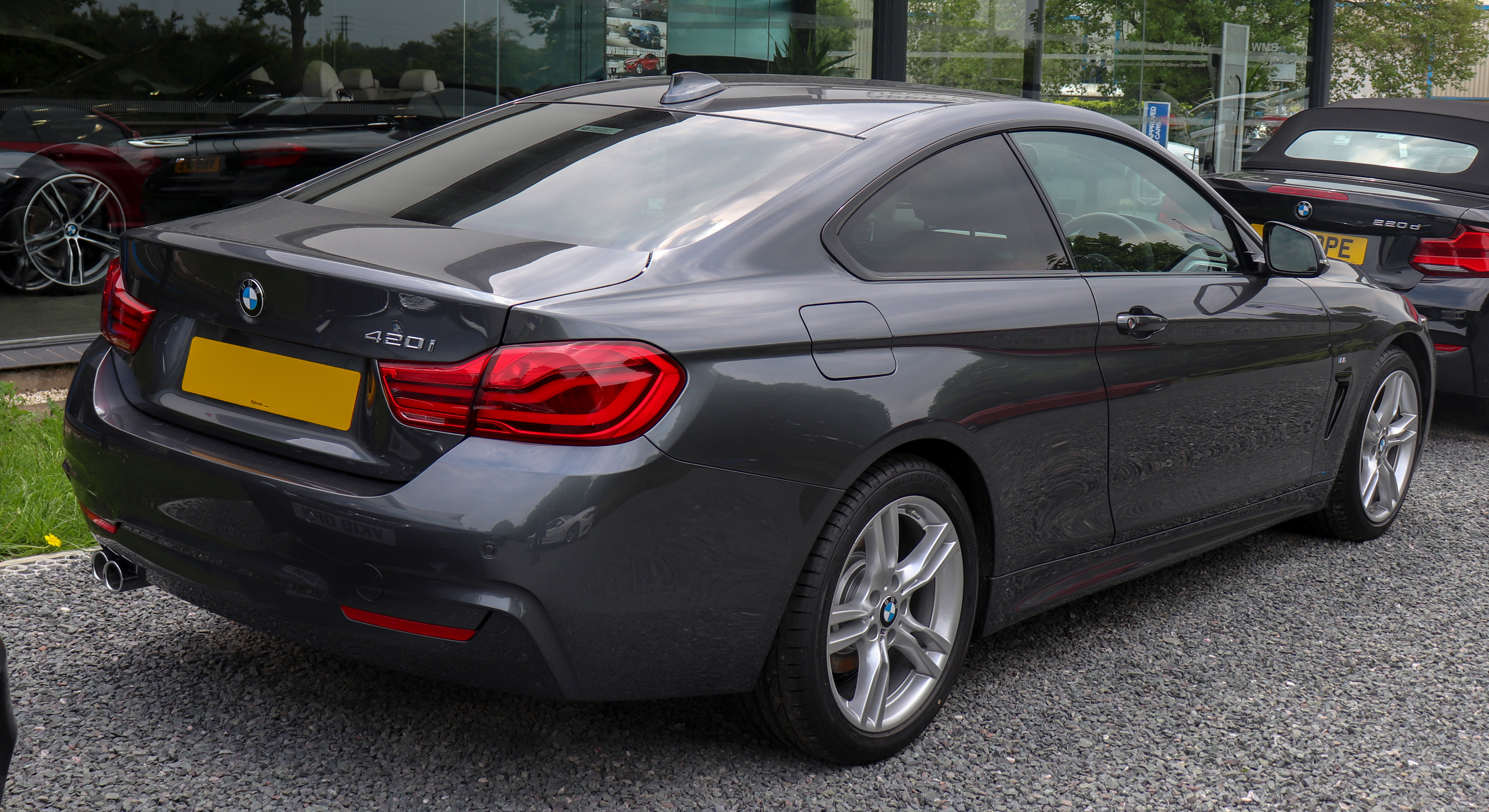
F32 coupé

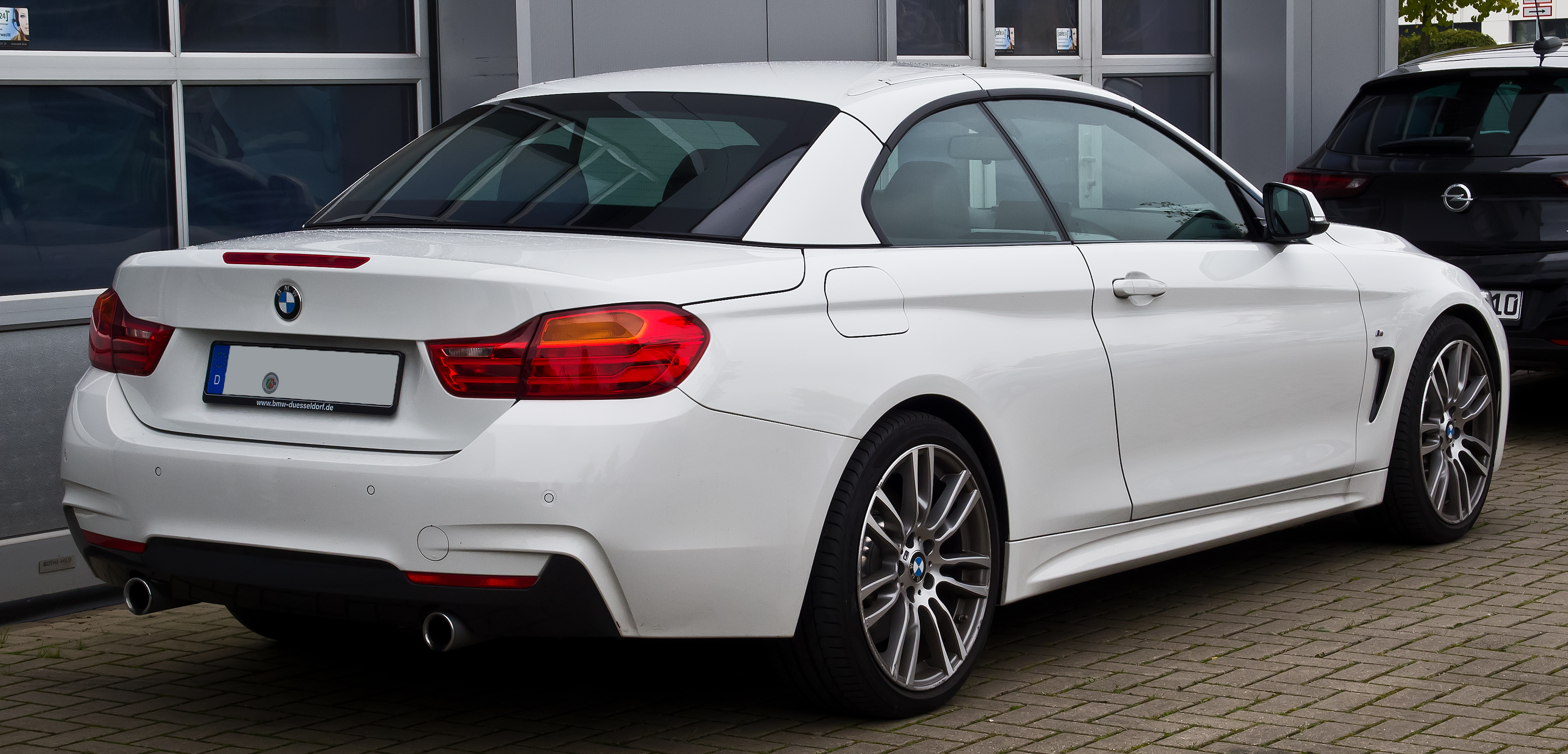
F33 convertible

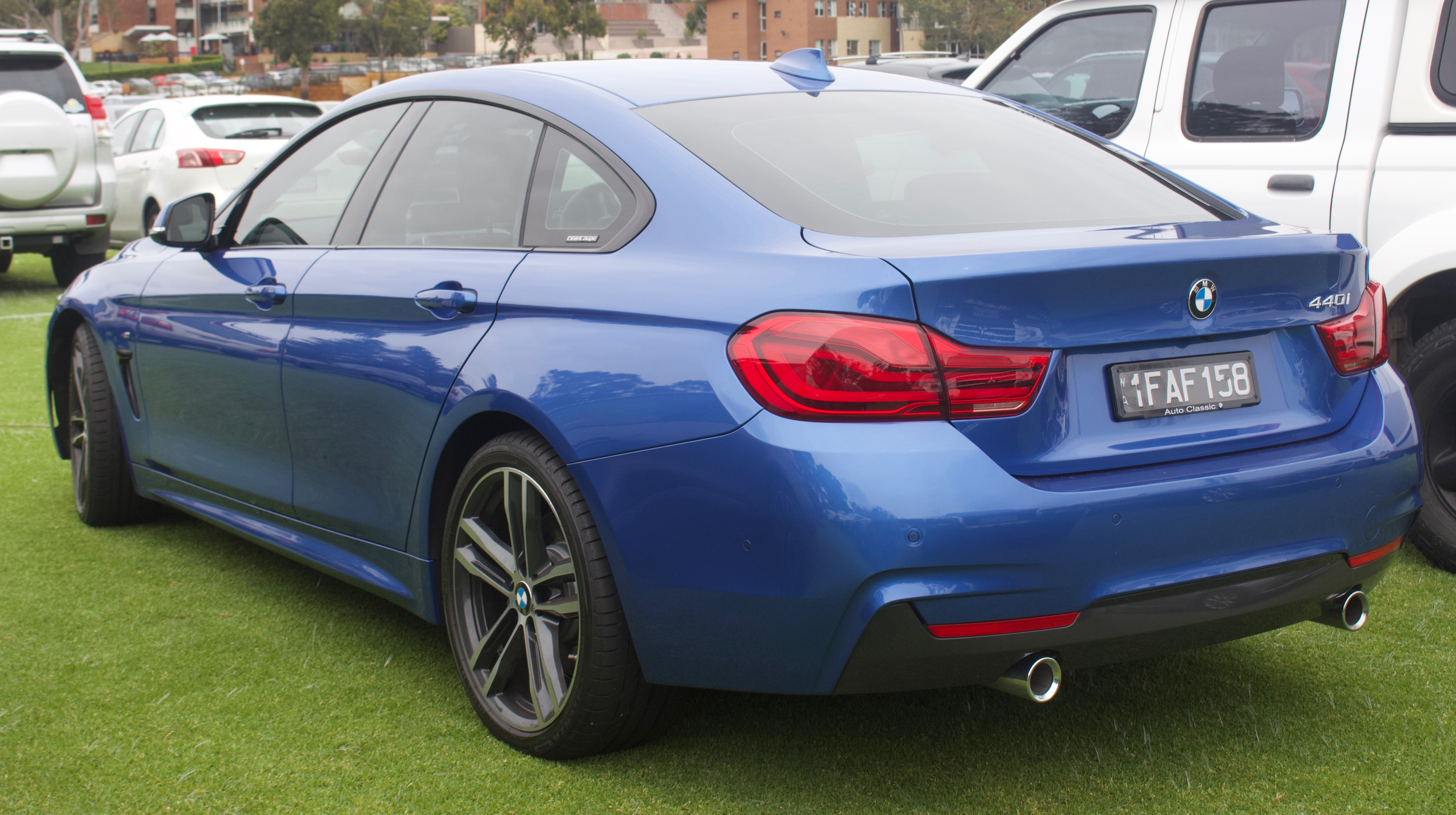
F36 Gran Coupe

=== Coupé (F32) ===
The coupé models were unveiled in September 2013 at the Frankfurt Motor Show. Nicolas Huet was the lead designer of the F32 coupe.

The launch models consisted of the petrol 428i and 435i, and the diesel 420d. In the remainder of 2013, the following models were added: 420i, 420d, 425d, 430d and 435d. In 2014, the 418d model was added. Most models were available with all-wheel drive ("xDrive").

=== Convertible (F33) ===
The convertible body style was unveiled at the 2013 Tokyo Motor Show, followed by the 2013 LA Auto Show.

Its international launch was in Las Vegas in January 2014. The launch models were the petrol-engined 428i and 435i, and the diesel 420d. All-wheel drive (xDrive) became available a few months after the launch.

Like its predecessor, the F33 has a three-part retractable hardtop. It includes noise-absorbing headliner and air curtains. A wind deflector and neck warmers were available as options.

=== Gran Coupé (F36) ===
The 4 Series Gran Coupé was unveiled at the 2014 Geneva Motor Show, followed by 2014 New York International Auto Show and the 13th Beijing International Automotive Exhibition in 2014. Production of the Gran Coupé began in the Dingolfing plant in July 2014.

As per the larger 6 Series Gran Coupé (F06), the F36 has coupé styling with a fastback rear. However, the F36 also includes a C-pillar located behind the rear doors. Compared with the F30 sedan, the F36 has 13 mm (0.5 in) less rear headroom and the same cargo volume. With the rear seats folded down, the F36 has a cargo volume of 1,300 L (45.9 cu ft).

The launch models were the petrol-engined 420i, 428i and 435i, and the diesel 418d and 420d. The 435i Gran Coupé is approximately 91 kg (200 lb) heavier than the equivalent F30 335i sedan.

== Equipment ==
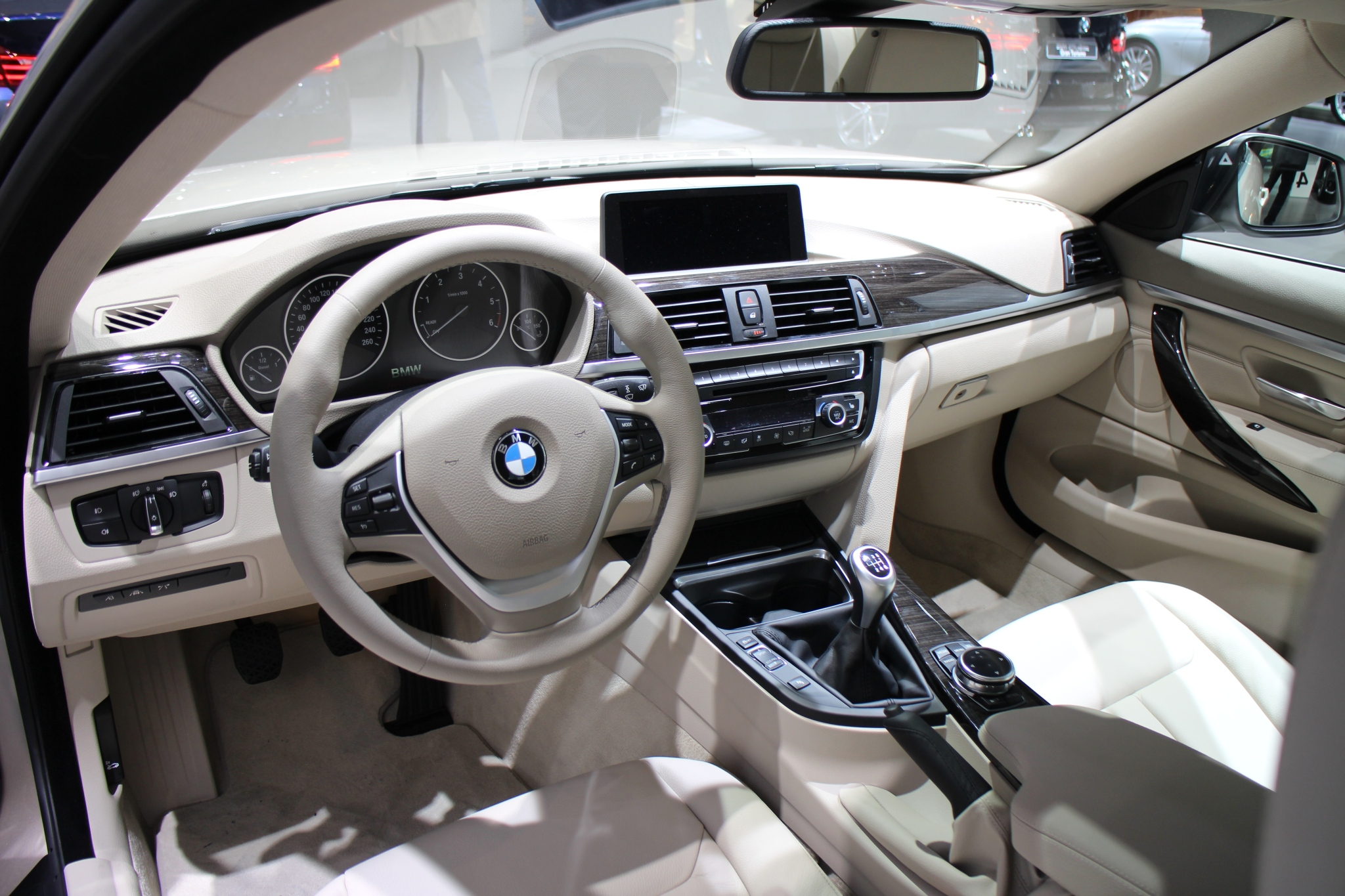
Interior

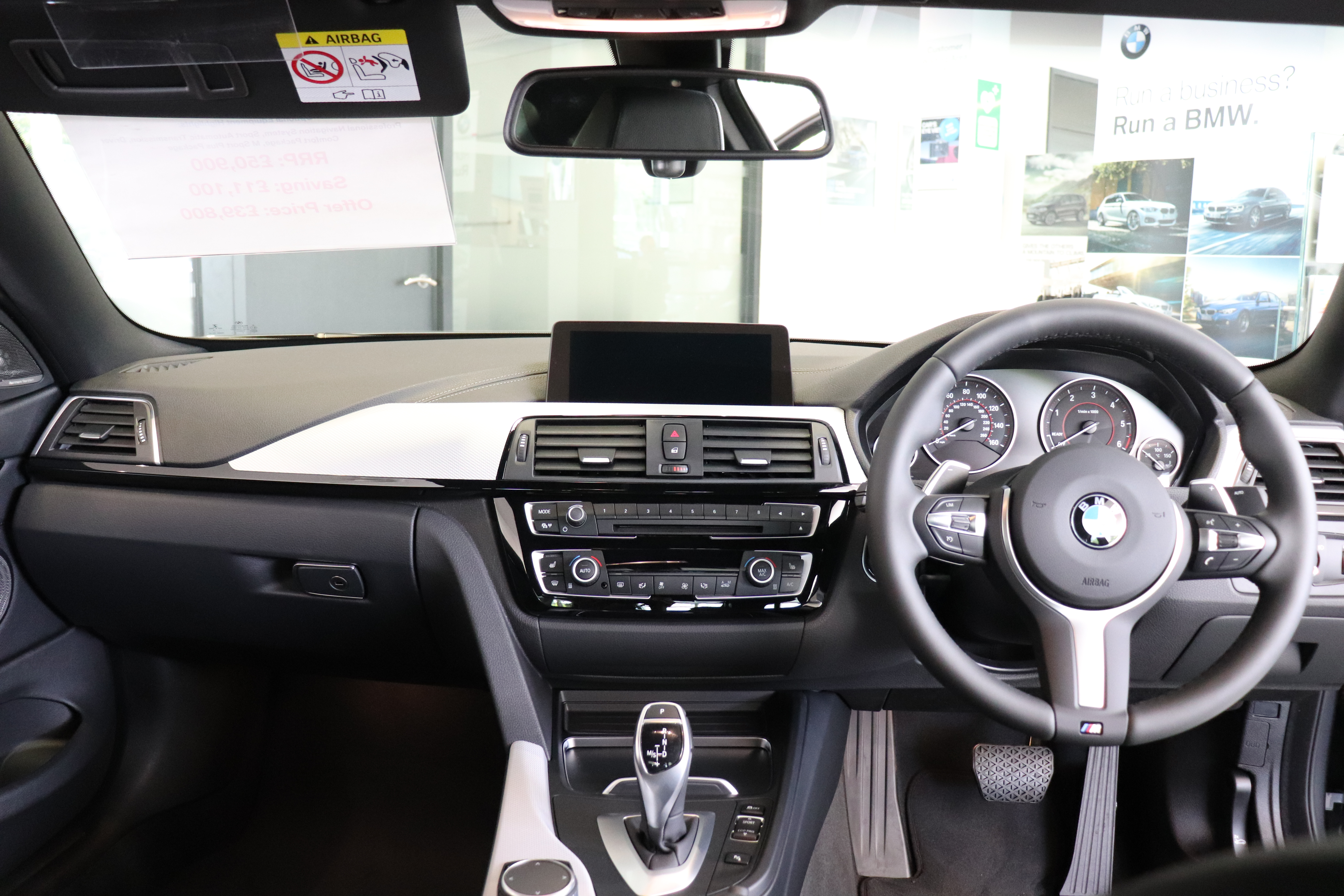
Interior (M Sport trim)

Available equipment includes a head-up display, 8-speed automatic transmission and LED headlights.

Optional "BMW M Performance Parts" were unveiled at the 2013 Frankfurt Motor Show. The available upgrades included exhausts, power upgrades, bodykit, limited slip differential, steering wheels and interior trims.

== Engines ==
=== Petrol ===
Model	Years	Engine	Power	Torque
418i	2016–2019	1.5 L B38 turbo I3	100 kW (134 hp) at 4,400–6,000 rpm	220 N⋅m (162 ft⋅lb) at 1,250–4,300 rpm
420i	2014–2016	2.0 L N20 turbo I4	135 kW (181 hp) at 5,000–6,250 rpm	270 N⋅m (199 ft⋅lb) at 1,250–4,500 rpm
420i	2016–2019	2.0 L B48 turbo I4	135 kW (181 hp) at 5,000–6,500 rpm	290 N⋅m (214 ft⋅lb) at 1,350–4,600 rpm
428i	2013–2016	2.0 L N20 turbo I4	180 kW (241 hp) at 5,000–6,000 rpm	350 N⋅m (258 ft⋅lb) at 1,250–4,800 rpm
430i	2016–2019	2.0 L B48 turbo I4	185 kW (248 hp) at 5,250–6,500 rpm	350 N⋅m (258 ft⋅lb) at 1,450–4,800 rpm
435i	2013–2016	3.0 L N55 turbo I6	225 kW (302 hp) at 5,800–6,500 rpm	400 N⋅m (295 ft⋅lb) at 1,200–5,000 rpm
440i	2016–2019	3.0 L B58 turbo I6	240 kW (322 hp) at 5,500–6,500 rpm	450 N⋅m (332 ft⋅lb) at 1,380–5,000 rpm
M4	2013–2019	3.0 L S55 twin-turbo I6	317 kW (425 hp) at 5,600–7,300 rpm	550 N⋅m (406 ft⋅lb) at 1,800–5,500 rpm
M4 Comp	2016–2019	3.0 L S55 twin-turbo I6	331 kW (444 hp) at 7,000 rpm	550 N⋅m (406 ft⋅lb) at 1,800–5,500 rpm
M4 CS	2017–2019	3.0 L S55 twin-turbo I6	338 kW (453 hp) at 6,250–7,000 rpm	600 N⋅m (443 ft⋅lb) at 4,000–5,380 rpm
M4 GTS/ M4 DTM Champion Edition	2016	3.0 L S55 twin-turbo I6	368 kW (493 hp) at 6,250 rpm	600 N⋅m (443 ft⋅lb) at 4,000–5,000 rpm

=== Diesel ===
Model	Years	Engine	Power	Torque
418d	2014–2019	2.0 L N47 turbo I4	105 kW (141 hp) at 4,000 rpm	300 N⋅m (221 ft⋅lb) at 1,750–3,000 rpm
418d	2015–2019	2.0 L B47 turbo I4	110 kW (148 hp) at 4,000 rpm	320 N⋅m (236 ft⋅lb) at 1,500–3,000 rpm
420d	2013–2015	2.0 L N47 turbo I4	135 kW (181 hp) at 4,000 rpm	380 N⋅m (280 ft⋅lb) at 1,750–2,750 rpm
420d	2015–2019	2.0 L B47 turbo I4	140 kW (188 hp) at 4,000 rpm	400 N⋅m (295 ft⋅lb) at 1,750–2,500 rpm
425d	2014–2016	2.0 L N47 twin-turbo I4	160 kW (215 hp) at 4,400 rpm	450 N⋅m (332 ft⋅lb) at 1,500–2,500 rpm
425d	2016–2019	2.0 L B47 twin-turbo I4	165 kW (221 hp) at 4,400 rpm	450 N⋅m (332 ft⋅lb) at 1,500–3,000 rpm
430d	2014–2019	3.0 L N57 turbo I6	190 kW (255 hp) at 4,000 rpm	560 N⋅m (413 ft⋅lb) at 2,000–2,750 rpm
435d	2014–2019	3.0 L N57 twin-turbo I6	230 kW (308 hp) at 4,400 rpm	630 N⋅m (465 ft⋅lb) at 1,500–2,500 rpm

Packages

The BMW 4 Series has 4 different packages. Each package comes with different features: Premium package, Luxury Line package, Sport & M Sport.

Package	Focus	Key Features
Premium Package	Comfort, technology, & convinience	Heated seats, head-up display, sunroof (depends on the model year), & keyless entry
Luxury Line	A refined, traditional luxury look	Large use of chrome trim, authentic & classic materials, lighter interior colors, refined interior fabric, & 18-inch alloy wheels
Sport	Sporty aesthetics & driving engagement	High-gloss black exterior trim, red or black contrast stitching interior, different styled grille, sport suspension, 18-inch alloy wheels, & sport leather steering wheel
M Sport	Sharp handling, sportier looks, & motorsport-inspired materials	M sport body kit, M sport steering wheel, exclusive M sport style wheels, & sport seats made from pure leather

== M4 version ==
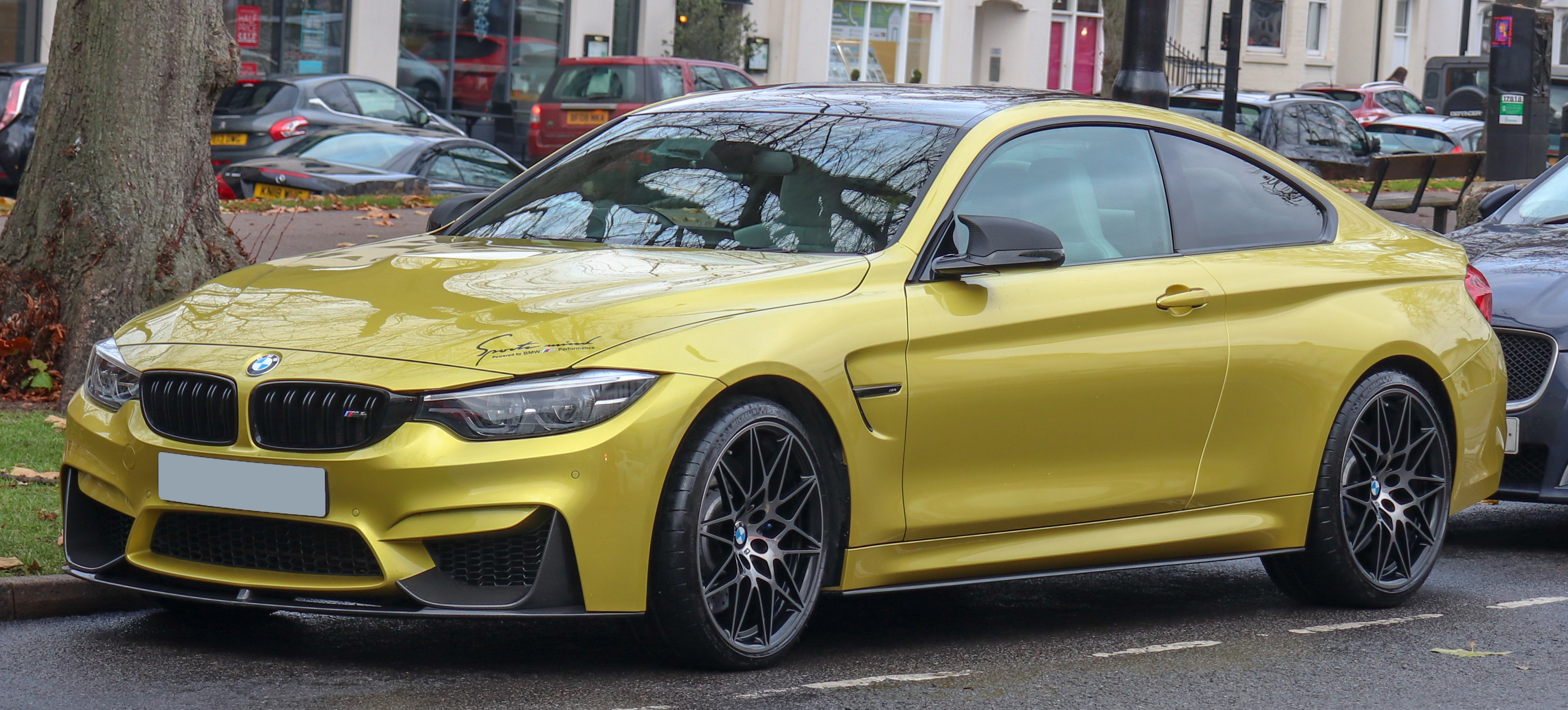
M4 Coupé (F82)

Up until 2014, BMW M models used the same model codes as the rest of the model range. However, the F32/F33/F36 generation was one of the first where the M models use separate model codes: F82 for the coupé and F83 for the convertible.

The F82/F83 M4 is powered by the S55 twin-turbocharged straight-6 engine rated at 317 kW (425 hp) and 550 N⋅m (406 lb⋅ft). The gearbox is either a 6-speed manual (with throttle blip on downshifts) or a 7-speed dual clutch transmission (M-DCT).

The M4 also features an electronically controlled limited-slip differential, electric steering, additional bolted joints between the axle subframe and the body sills, aluminium stiffening plate and a five-link rear suspension constructed from aluminium. Carbon-fibre is used for the roof, bootlid, strut brace and driveshaft. Unusually, the suspension subframes are directly connected to the chassis without rubber bushings. An optional head-up display comes with additional M-specific functions such as a gear display, rev counter and Optimum Shift Indicator.

The concept version of the M4 Coupé was unveiled at the Pebble Beach Concours d'Elegance on 15 August 2013, followed production version being unveiled at the 2014 North American International Auto Show on 13 January 2014.

The production version of the M4 convertible was also unveiled at the 2014 New York International Auto Show.

== Alpina version ==
The Alpina B4 (petrol) and Alpina D4 (diesel) models were based on the F32.

== Model year changes ==
=== 2016 ===
- Limited Edition 435i ZHP Coupé model released in the USA.
- Engines upgraded, along with F30 3 Series LCI models.
  - 440i model replaces the 435i, and 430i model replaces the 428i.
  - 425d model introduced

=== 2017 facelift ===
The facelift (LCI) changes were unveiled on 16 January 2017, with the first pictures of the refreshed Coupé (F32 LCI) shown in the new color Snapper Rocks Blue (turquoise blue), and the Convertible (F33 LCI) shown in the also new, Sunset Orange colour (bright orange). The Gran Coupé (F36 LCI) model was shown in a silver colour. Major changes include:

- Exterior design changes including redesigned LED headlights, tail-lights, and bumpers
- Interior design changes including an updated iDrive system (version 6.0)
- Revised stiffer suspension on Coupé and Gran Coupé models
- New additional trim, wheel, and exterior colour options
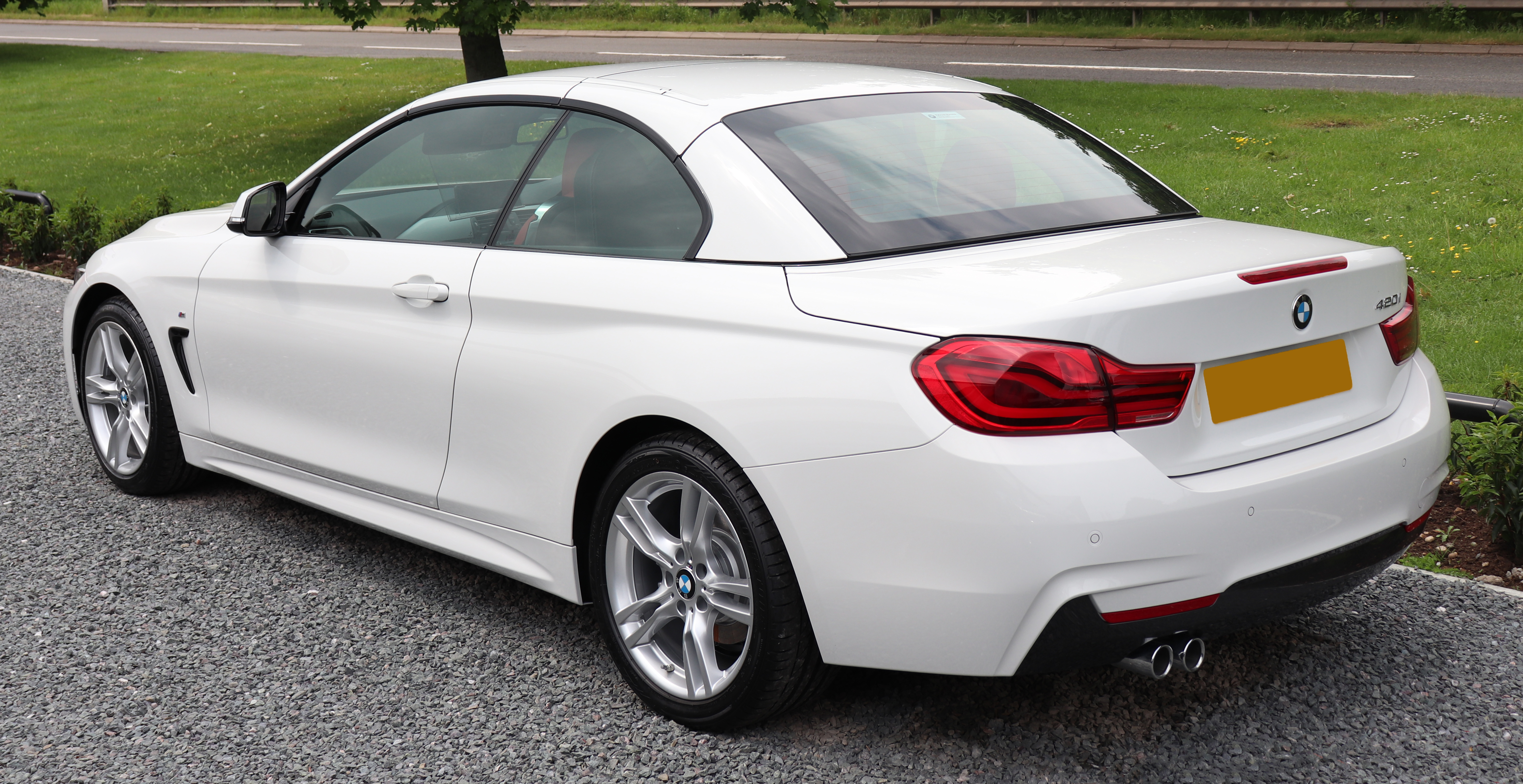
Post-facelift convertible

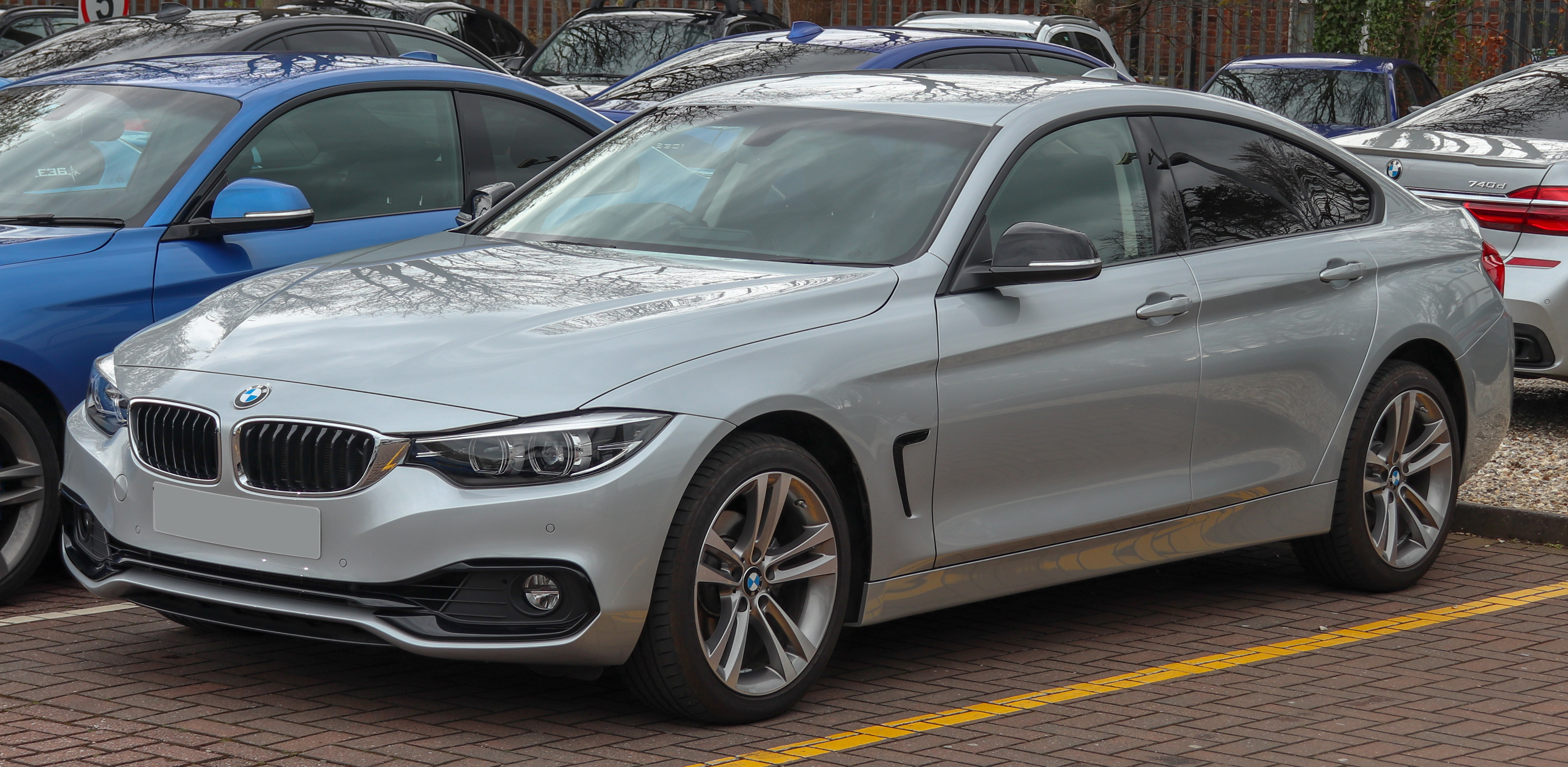
Post-facelift Gran Coupé

== Motorsport ==
=== M4 DTM Touring Car ===
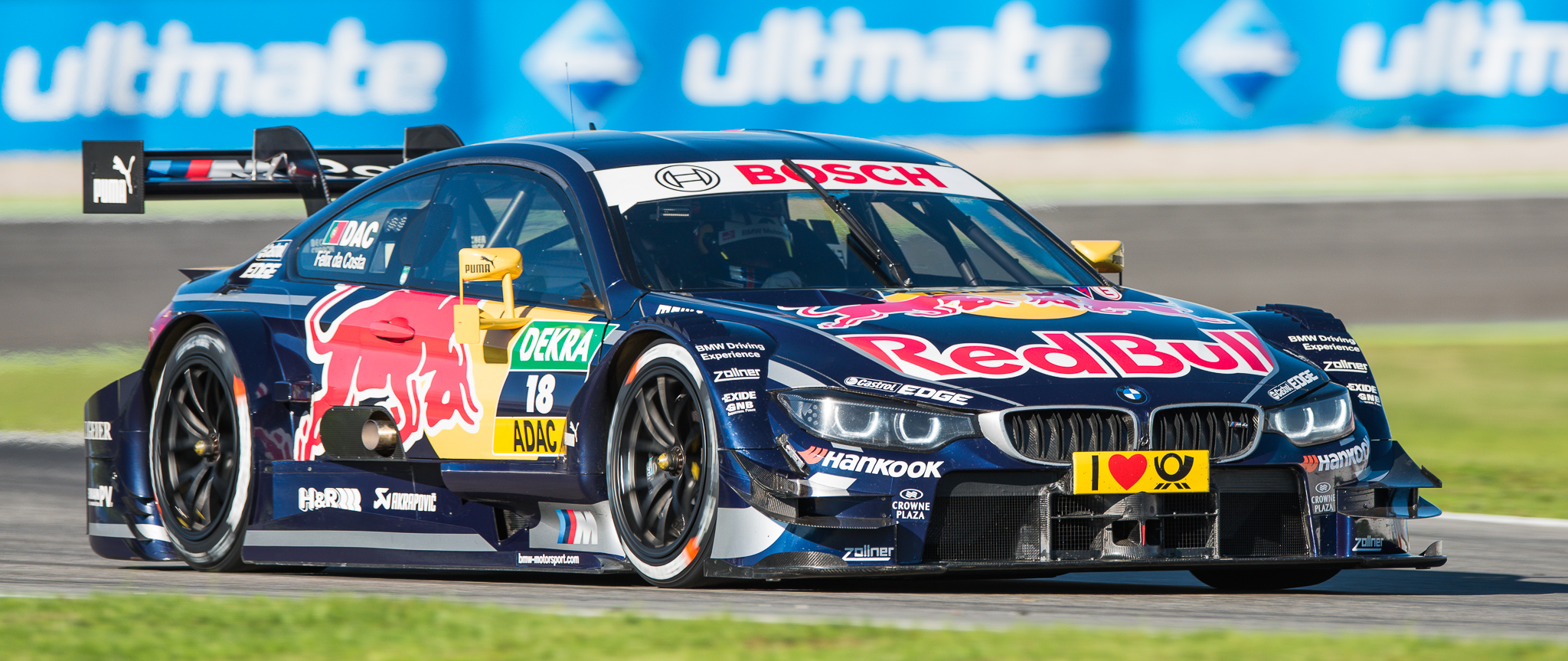
BMW M4 DTM

The M4 DTM was developed in 2013 to replace the E92 M3 DTM, has been raced in DTM from 2014 to the present. It was designed by BMW chief engineer Dominic Harlow and unveiled in official ITR tests in Budapest. The M4 DTM replaced the retired BMW M3 DTM at the end of the 2013 season.

In its debut 2014 season, Marco Wittmann won the Drivers' Championship in the M4 and Team RMG won the Teams' Championship. In the 2016 season, Marco Wittman again won the Drivers' Championship in the M4.

=== M4 DTM Safety Car ===
The M4 were used as a safety car at DTM races from 2014–present. The M4 DTM Safety Car features Recaro racing seats, a roll bar, bonnet with "motorsport lock", LED lights on the roof and LED lights on the front apron.

=== M4 MotoGP Safety Car ===
The M4 was used as a safety car at MotoGP races from 2014–present. The car was unveiled at the 2014 Qatar motorcycle Grand Prix. It features Recaro racing seats, a roll bar, bonnet with motorsport lock, LED lights at roof and front apron, main electricity switch at bonnet, removal of the rear seat, fuel pump system, a fire extinguisher and a race display on the steering wheel.

== Production volumes ==
The F32 coupé and F82 M4 coupé are produced in Munich, with production beginning in July 2013. The F33 convertible is produced in Regensburg, beginning in November 2013. The F36 Gran Coupé is produced in Dingolfing.

The following are production figures for the 4 Series range:

Year	Production
2013	14,763
2014	119,580
2015	152,390
2016	133,272
2017	133,104
2018	109,887

== See also ==
- Alpina B4
- BMW 3 Series (F30)
- BMW 4 Series
