= BMW N57 =

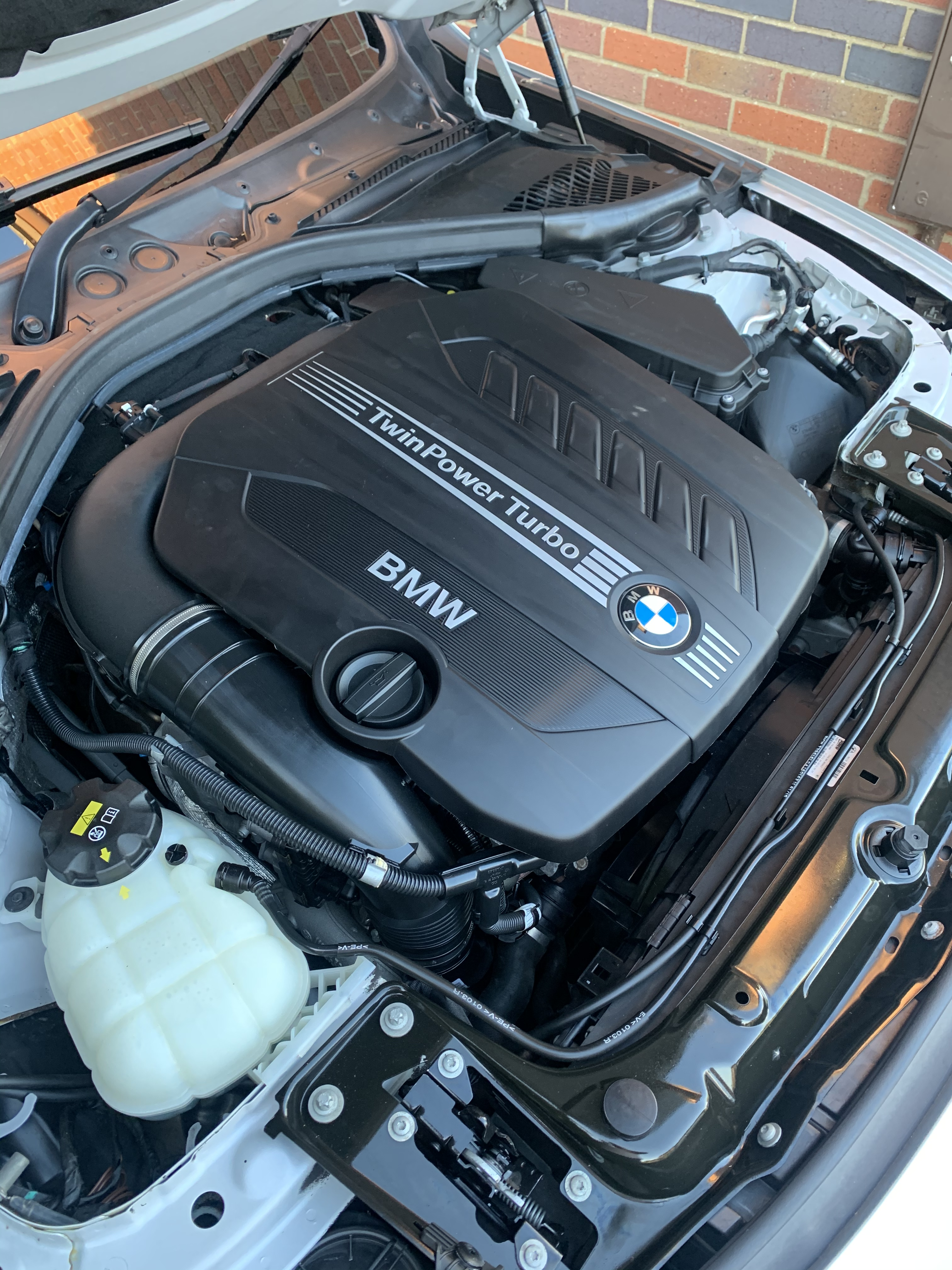

Overview
- Manufacturer: BMW
- Production: 2008–2019

Layout
- Configuration: Straight-6
- Displacement: 3.0 L; 182.6 cu in (2,993 cc)
- Cylinder bore: 84 mm (3.31 in)
- Piston stroke: 90 mm (3.54 in)
- Cylinder block material: Aluminium
- Cylinder head material: Aluminium
- Valvetrain: DOHC 4 valves x cyl.

RPM range
- Max. engine speed: 5400

Combustion
- Turbocharger: Single, Twin-turbo or Tri-Turbo variable-geometry
- Fuel system: Common rail Direct Injection
- Management: Bosch
- Fuel type: Diesel fuel DIN EN 590
- Cooling system: Water-cooled

Output
- Power output: 150–280 kW (201–375 hp)
- Torque output: 450–740 N⋅m (332–546 lb⋅ft)

Chronology
- Predecessor: BMW M57; BMW M67
- Successor: BMW B57

The BMW N57 is a family of aluminium, turbocharged straight-6 common rail diesel engines. The engines utilize variable geometry turbochargers and Bosch piezo-electric injectors. The engine jointly replaced the M57 straight-6 and M67 V8 engines.

== Summary ==
Engine code	Power	Torque	Redline (manual/auto)	Years
N57D30U0	150 kW (201 hp) at 3750	430 N⋅m (317 lb⋅ft) at 1750-2500	5000/4250	2010
N57D30U0 (F07 525d)	155 kW (208 hp) at 4000	450 N⋅m (332 lb⋅ft) at 1750-2500	5000/4250	2010
N57D30O0 (E9x 330d)	180 kW (241 hp) at 4000	520 N⋅m (384 lb⋅ft) at 1750-3000	5000/4500	2008
N57D30O0	180 kW (241 hp) at 4000	540 N⋅m (398 lb⋅ft) at 1750-3000	5400/4500	2008
N57D30O1	190 kW (255 hp) at 4000	560 N⋅m (413 lb⋅ft) at 1500-3000	5400/4300	2011
N57D30T0	225 kW (302 hp) at 4400	600 N⋅m (443 lb⋅ft) at 1500-2500	5000/4750	2009
N57D30T1	230 kW (308 hp) at 4400	630 N⋅m (465 lb⋅ft) at 1500-2500	5200/4600	2011
N57S	280 kW (375 hp) at 4000-4400	740 N⋅m (546 lb⋅ft) at 2000-3000	5400/4600	2012

== N57D30 ==
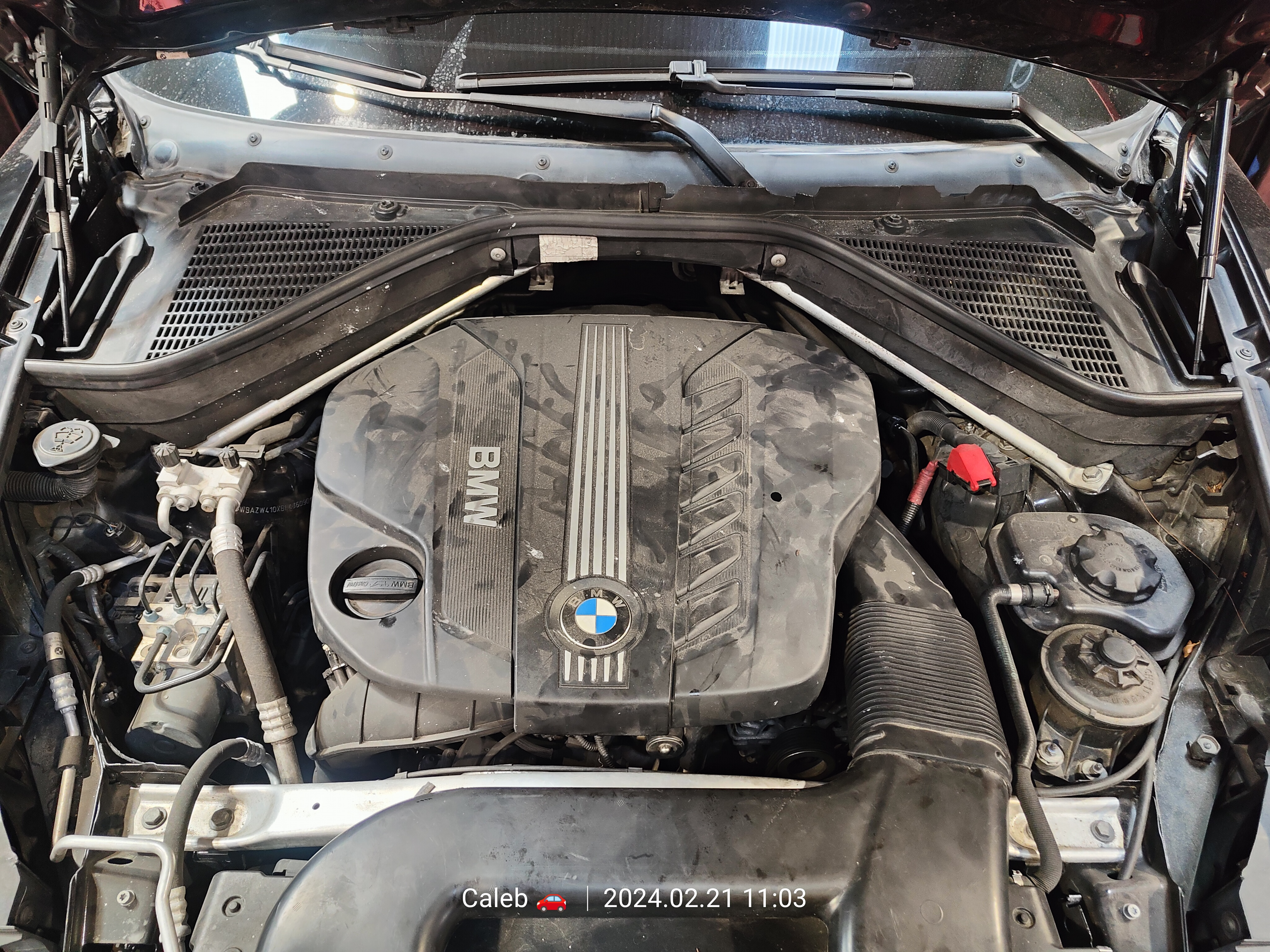
BMW N57D30O0 Engine

N57D30Ox has 1800 bar fuel pressure, while N57D30Tx has 2000 bar fuel pressure.

N57D30Ox uses a single turbocharger, while N57D30Tx uses twin-turbochargers, and N57S uses three turbochargers of varying size.

- Bore x stroke: 84 mm × 90 mm (3.31 in × 3.54 in)
- BMW released an M Performance Kit for N57D30O1 in some markets boosting power to 210 kW (282 hp) and torque to 600 N⋅m (443 lb⋅ft). This kit included the larger intercooler of the N57D30T0

Applications:

- N57D30U0
  - 2010 - 2011 BMW 5 Series F10/F11 525d
  - 2010 - 2013 BMW 3 Series E90/E91/E92/E93 325d
- N57D30O0
  - 2008 - 2013 BMW 3 Series E90/E91/E92/E93 330d/330xd
  - 2010 - 2011 BMW 5 Series F10/F11 530d
  - 2009 - BMW 5 Series GT F07 530d GT/530d xDrive GT
  - 2008 - 2012 BMW 7 Series F01/F02 730d/730Ld
  - 2010 - 2013 BMW X5 E70 xDrive30d
  - 2010 - 2014 BMW X6 E71 xDrive30d
- N57D30O1
  - 2011 - 2016 BMW 5 Series F10/F11 530d
  - 2011 - BMW X3 F25 xDrive30d
  - 2011 - 2016 BMW X5 F15 xDrive35d
  - 2012 - 2019 BMW 3 Series F30/F31 330d
  - 2014 - BMW 4 Series F32/F33/F36 430d
  - 2012 - 2015 BMW 7 Series F01/F02 730d/730Ld
- N57D30T0
  - 2010 - 2011 BMW 5 Series F10/F11 535d
  - 2009 - 2017 BMW 5 Series GT F07 535d GT/535d xDrive GT
  - 2009 - 2015 BMW 7 Series F01 740d/740d xDrive
  - 2010 - 2013 BMW X5 E70 xDrive40d
  - 2010 - 2014 BMW X6 E71 xDrive40d
- N57D30T1
  - 2011 - 2016 BMW 5 Series F10/F11 535d
  - 2011 - 2018 BMW 6 Series F12/F13 640d
  - 2011 - BMW X3 F25 xDrive35d
  - 2013 - 2019 BMW 3 Series F30/F31 335d
  - 2014 - BMW 4 Series F32/F33/F36 435d
  - 2014 - BMW X4 F26 X4 xDrive35d
  - 2014 - BMW X5 F15 X5 xDrive40d
  - 2015 - BMW X6 F16 X6 xDrive40d
- N57S (Tri-Turbo)
  - 2012 - 2017 BMW 5 Series F10/F11 M550d xDrive
  - 2012 - 2015 BMW 7 Series F01 750d xDrive
  - 2012 - 2015 BMW 7 Series F01 750Ld xDrive
  - 2012 - 2013 BMW X5 E70 M50d
  - 2012 - 2014 BMW X6 M50d
  - 2013 - 2018 BMW X5 F15 M50d
  - 2015 - 2018 BMW X6 F16 M50d

== Engine fires in police vehicles ==
In January 2022, BMW released a statement acknowledging the presence of a technical issue with the N57 engine which contributed to instances of police vehicles in the United Kingdom catching fire, including one case in January 2020 which resulted in the death of a British police officer. This issue led to police forces across the United Kingdom withdrawing, retiring or limiting the speed of vehicles powered by the N57 engine, preventing their use in pursuits. In the press release, BMW stated “This issue is associated with the particular way in which the police operate these high-performance vehicles […] there is no need for action on civilian vehicles”. It was reported that the issue was caused by high-speed driving after long periods of engine idling.

Safety concerns about this engine in 2016, and the 2022 inquest into the death of PC Nicholas Dumphreys on 26 January 2020, had the consequence that in January 2023, BMW stopped supplying cars to UK police altogether and closed down their International and Specialist Sales Division at their dealership in Park Lane, Mayfair. Police forces are instead moving to other brands, such as the Volvo XC90 and Volkswagen Touareg.

== See also ==
- List of BMW engines
