= BMW N55 =

BMW engine manufactured from 2009 to 2021

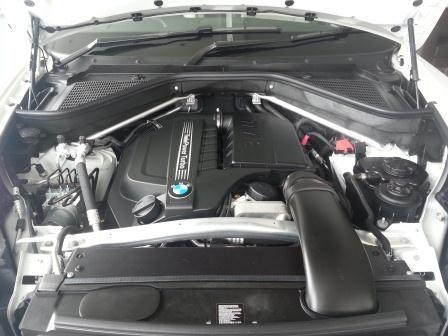

Overview
- Production: 2009–2021

Layout
- Configuration: Straight-6
- Displacement: 3.0 L (2,979 cc)
- Cylinder bore: 84 mm (3.3 in)
- Piston stroke: 89.6 mm (3.5 in)
- Cylinder block material: Aluminium
- Cylinder head material: Aluminium
- Valvetrain: DOHC, with VVT & VVL
- Valvetrain drive system: Chain
- Compression ratio: 10.2:1

RPM range
- Max. engine speed: 7,000 RPM

Combustion
- Turbocharger: Single BorgWarner twin-scroll with Intercooler
- Management: Bosch MEVD 17.2
- Fuel type: Petrol

Chronology
- Predecessor: BMW N54
- Successor: BMW B58

The BMW N55 is a turbocharged straight-six petrol (gasoline) engine that began production in 2009. The N55 replaced the BMW N54 engine and was introduced in the F07 5 Series Gran Turismo.

The N55 was BMW's first straight-six engine to use a twin-scroll turbocharger. It also won three straight Ward's 10 Best Engines awards in 2011–2013.

Following the introduction of the BMW B58 engine in 2015, the N55 began to be phased out.

The BMW S55 engine is a high performance version of the N55 made by BMW M GmbH, which is used by the F80 M3, F82 M4 and F87 M2 Competition/CS.

== Design ==
The main differences between the N55 and its N54 predecessor are the use of a single turbocharger, the addition of Valvetronic and the type of fuel injectors. Whilst the N54 used a twin-turbo arrangement, the newer N55 uses only a single twin scroll turbocharger. Valvetronic (variable valve lift) is claimed to improve throttle response, low-rev torque, exhaust emissions and to reduce fuel consumption by approximately 15%. The direct injection system uses solenoid-type injectors, instead of the piezo-type fuel injectors used by its N54 predecessor. The piezo injectors were more expensive and BMW decided they were not worthwhile outside of Europe, because the potential benefits of lean-burn operation could not be fully realised.

The exhaust manifold design, called Cylinder-bank Comprehensive Manifold (CCM) by BMW, aims to reduce the pressure fluctuations to reduce throttle lag and exhaust back-pressure. The twin-scroll turbocharger uses 2 sets of exhaust duct to turn 1 turbine wheel, with cylinders 1–3 and 4–6. The engine management system is Bosch MEVD 17.2, and compatible fuels are ROZ (RON) 91–98 octane (minimum RON 95 is recommended),

The compression ratio is 10.2:1, the bore is 84.0 mm (3.31 in), the stroke is 89.6 mm (3.53 in) and the displacement is 2,979 cc (181.8 cu in), all of which are unchanged from its predecessor, the N54.

== Versions ==
Version	Power	Torque	Redline	Years
N55B30M0	225 kW (302 bhp) at 5,700–5,800 rpm	400 N⋅m (295 lb⋅ft) at 1,200–5,000 rpm	7,000 rpm	2009–2019
N55B30	235 kW (315 bhp) at 4,505–6,000 rpm	450 N⋅m (332 lb⋅ft) at 1,300–4,500 rpm	7,000 rpm	2011–present
N55B30O0	240 kW (322 bhp) at 4,505–6,000 rpm	450 N⋅m (332 lb⋅ft) at 1,300–4,500 rpm	7,000 rpm	2014–2016
N55HP	250 kW (335 bhp) at 4,505–6,000 rpm	450 N⋅m (332 lb⋅ft) at 1,300–4,500 rpm	7,000 rpm	2013–2015
N55B30T0	265 kW (355 bhp) at 5,255–6,000 rpm	465 N⋅m (343 lb⋅ft) at 1,350–5,250 rpm	7,000 rpm	2015–present
N55B30T0	272 kW (365 bhp) at 6,500 rpm	500 N⋅m (369 lb⋅ft) at 1,450–4750 rpm	7,000 rpm	2015–present
Alpina	301 kW (404 bhp) at 5,500–6,250 rpm	600 N⋅m (443 lb⋅ft) at 3,000–4,000 rpm	7,000 rpm	2013–2017
Alpina	324 kW (434 bhp) at 5,500–6250 rpm	660 N⋅m (487 lb⋅ft) at 3,000–4,000 rpm	7,000 rpm	2017–present
Alpina	332 kW (445 bhp) at 5,500–6,250 rpm	680 N⋅m (502 lb⋅ft) at 3,000–4,500 rpm	7,000 rpm	2018–present

=== N55B30M0 ===
Applications:

- 2009–2017 F10/F11/F07 535i
- 2010–2013 E90/E91/E92/E93 335i
- 2010–2013 E82/E88 135i
- 2010–2017 F25 X3 xDrive35i
- 2011–2013 E70 X5 xDrive 35i
- 2011–2015 F30/F34/F31 335i
- 2011–2014 E71 X6 xDrive 35i
- 2012–2015 E84 X1 xDrive35i
- 2013–2016 F32/F33/F36 435i
- 2014–2018 F15 X5 xDrive 35i
- 2014–2019 F16 X6 xDrive35i
- 2014–2016 F26 X4 xDrive 35i

=== N55B30 ===
Applications:

- 2011–2018 F06/F12/F13 640i
- 2012–2013 E82/E88 135is
- 2012–2015 F20/F21 M135i
- 2012–2015 F01/F02 740i/Li

=== N55B30O0 ===
Applications:

- 2013–2016 F22/F23 M235i
- 2015–2016 F20/F21 M135i LCI

=== N55HP ===
Applications:

- 2013–2015 F30 ActiveHybrid 3
- 2011–2016 F10 ActiveHybrid 5

=== N55B30T0 ===
Applications:

- 2016–2018 F87 M2 — 272 kW (365 bhp)
- 2015–2018 F26 X4 M40i — 265 kW (355 bhp)

=== 272 kW version ===
The N55B30T0 uses multiple internal components adapted from the S55 as well as other upgrades to the engine internals. The pistons, forged rods, rod bearings, and oil management systems are all adapted from the S55 engine. Other upgrades to the engine internals include a forged crankshaft and cast-iron cylinder liners.

=== Alpina ===
Biturbo engine by Alpina based on the N55B30M0. The crankcase is of a different design and specially cast by BMW for Alpina.

==== 301 kW version ====
The N55R20A is Alpina's initial version of the N55, producing 301 kW (404 bhp). The twin turbocharger system of the N54B30 is used, replacing the twin-scroll charging system originally applied.

Applications:

- 2013–2017 Alpina F30 B3 Bi-Turbo
- 2013–2017 Alpina F33/F34 B4 Bi-Turbo

==== 324 kW version ====
Applications:

- 2017–present Alpina F30/F31 B3 S Bi-Turbo
- 2017–present Alpina F32/F33 B4 S Bi-Turbo

==== 332 kW version ====
Application:

- 2018–present Alpina F32/F33 B4 S Bi-Turbo Edition 99

== S55 engine ==
BMW S55 engine
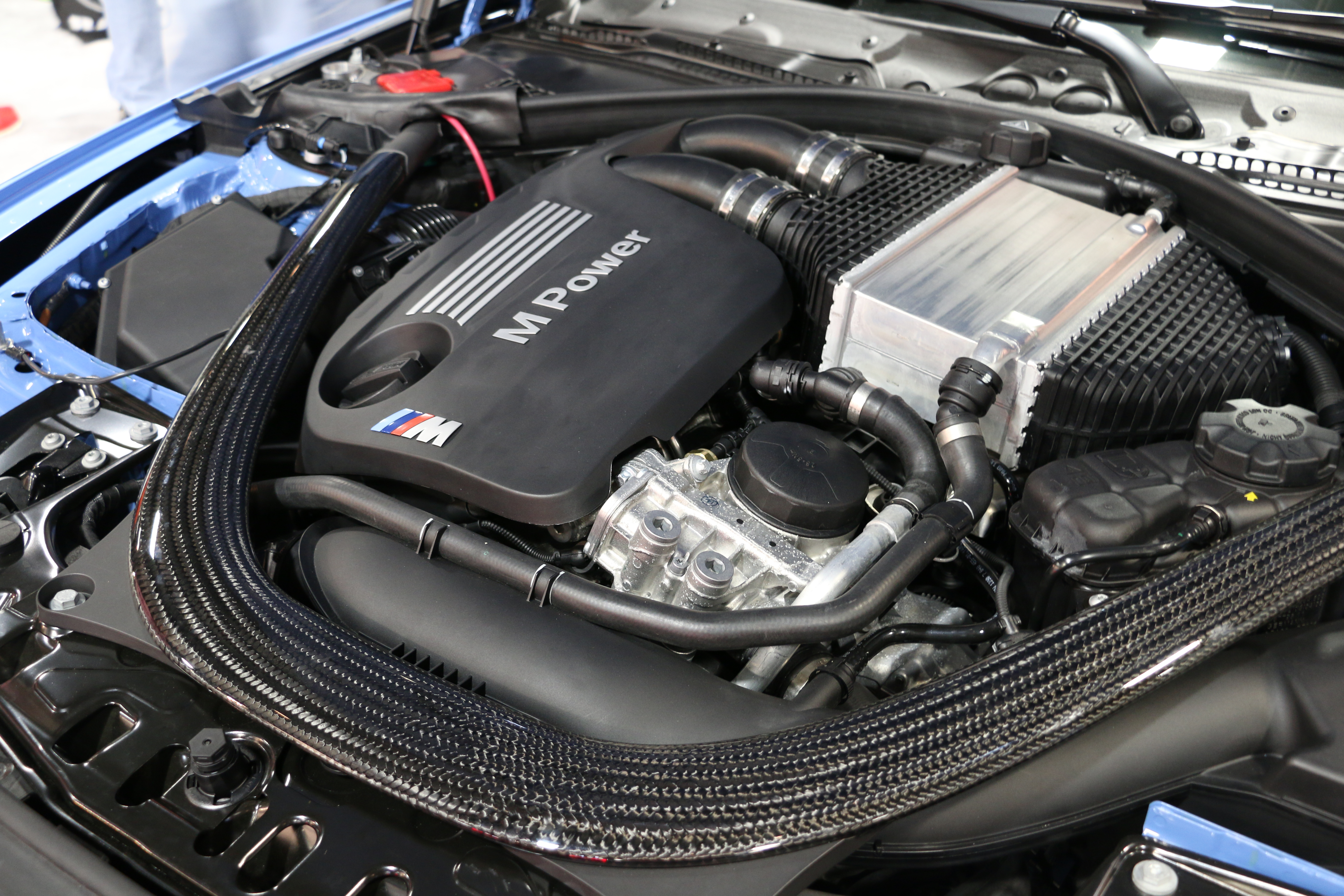

Layout
- Configuration: Straight-6
- Displacement: 2,979 cc (182 cu in)
- Cylinder bore: 84 mm (3.3 in)
- Piston stroke: 89.6 mm (3.53 in)
- Cylinder block material: Aluminium
- Valvetrain: DOHC, with VVT & VVL

RPM range
- Max. engine speed: 7,600 RPM

Combustion
- Turbocharger: Twin-turbo
- Fuel type: Petrol

Chronology
- Predecessor: BMW S54
- Successor: BMW S58

The S55 engine is the high-performance engine developed from the N55 by BMW M. It was introduced in the F80 M3 and F82 M4 replacing the BMW S65 naturally aspirated V8 engine used in the previous generation M3 and was later used in the F87 M2 Competition/CS.

Differences compared with the N55 include a closed-deck engine block, lightweight crankshaft, different crankshaft bearings, strengthened pistons/rods, different springs/valve material, twin turbos, twin fuel pumps, active exhaust, revised cooling system and intercoolers.

=== 205 kW (275 bhp) – 268 kW (359 bhp) version ===
Applications:

- 2020–2021 F87 M2 CS Racing

=== 302 kW (405 bhp), 550 N⋅m (410 lb⋅ft) version ===
Applications:

- 2019–2021 F87 M2 Competition

=== 317 kW (425 bhp) version ===
Applications:

- 2014–2018 F80 M3
- 2014–2020 F82/F83 M4

=== 331 kW (444 bhp) version ===
Applications:

- 2016–2018 F80 M3 with Competition package
- 2016–2020 F82/F83 M4 with Competition package
- 2020–2021 F87 M2 CS

=== 338 kW (453 bhp) version ===
Applications:

- 2018 F80 M3 CS
- 2017–2020 F82 M4 CS

=== 368 kW (493 hp) version ===
This version produces 368 kW (493 hp) and 600 N⋅m (443 lb⋅ft), due to the use of a water injection system. Three water injectors are used to lower the temperature of the air in the intake manifold, allowing the boost pressure to be increased from 17.2 psi (1.19 bar) to 21.6 psi (1.49 bar).

Applications:

- 2015–2016 F82 M4 GTS
- 2017 F82 M4 DTM Champion Edition

== See also ==
- List of BMW engines
