= Alpina B3 (F30) =

Alpina B3 and D3 (F30/F31)
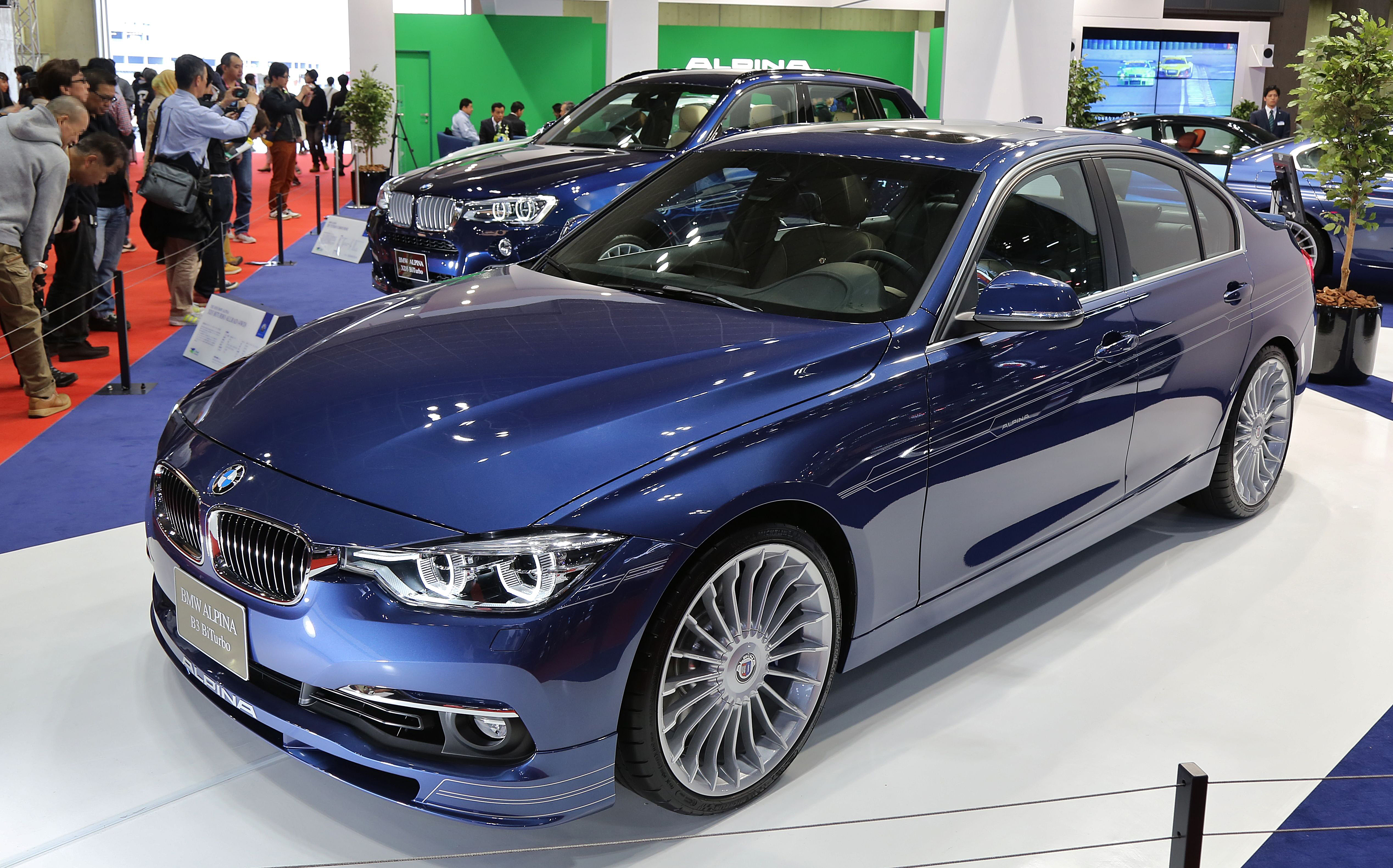

Overview
- Manufacturer: Alpina Burkard Bovensiepen GmbH & Co. KG
- Production: March 2013 – May 2019
- Assembly: Germany: Buchloe

Body and chassis
- Class: Compact executive car (D)
- Body style: 4-door saloon 5-door station wagon
- Layout: Front-engine, rear-wheel-drive/Front-engine, all-wheel-drive (xDrive)
- Related: BMW 3 Series (F30); Alpina B4

Powertrain
- Engine: Petrol: 3.0 L BMW N55 twin-turbocharged I6; Diesel: 3.0 L BMW N57 turbo diesel I6
- Transmission: 8-speed ZF 8HP70 automatic

Dimensions
- Wheelbase: 2,810 mm (110.6 in)
- Length: Saloon: 4,620 mm (181.9 in); Wagon: 4,628 mm (182.2 in)
- Width: 1,811 mm (71.3 in)
- Height: 1,430 mm (56.3 in)
- Curb weight: Saloon: 1,610 kg (3,549 lb) (dry, RWD version) 2,160 kg (4,762 lb) (Max permissible); Wagon: 1,675 kg (3,693 lb) (dry, RWD version) 2,225 kg (4,905 lb) (Max permissible)

Chronology
- Predecessor: Alpina B3 (E90)
- Successor: Alpina B3 (G20)

The Alpina B3 (F30/F31) and Alpina D3 (F30/F31) are compact executive cars manufactured by German automobile manufacturer, Alpina. Based on the BMW 3 Series (F30), the B3 is available in saloon and wagon body styles. The car was officially launched at the 2013 Geneva Motor Show.

== Development and introduction ==
The B3 is based on the BMW 335i and utilises a modified version of its N55 straight six engine. Alpina modified the engine by adding two smaller variable-geometry turbochargers in place of the standard single turbocharger, NGK spark plugs, electronically controlled bypass valve system, a high-performance fuel pump, a 40 percent larger intercooler, Alpina specific ECU along with a wiring loom and a forged high-strength steel crankshaft. These modifications allow the engine to generate 410 PS (302 kW; 404 hp) with RON 98 fuel and 600 N⋅m (443 lb⋅ft) of torque at 3,000 rpm. The front subframe along with the strut brace were modified in order to accommodate the powerful engine. The engine is mated to an 8-speed ZF "Touch tronic" automatic transmission with no manual transmission available as an option. The car is available in rear-wheel-drive and all-wheel-drive configurations.

The transmission consists of three modes, "Automatic (D)", "Manual (M)" and "Sport (S)". The Automatic mode focuses on driving comfort while the Sport mode reduces shift time and throttle response. When combined with the "Sport" or "Sport +" driving modes of the Drive performance system, the gearshifts are quicker due to a reduction in torque caused by the interruption of the injection of fuel into a given cylinder for a fraction of a second.

The B3 has an Akrapovič stainless steel exhaust system featuring quad exhaust pipes. The exhaust system has an electronically controlled valve that remains closed up to 2,500 rpm for more quiet city driving in comfort mode. In Sport mode however, the valve remains permanently open to provide optimum performance.

The brakes used in the car have ventilated 370 mm (14.6 in) discs with 4-piston calipers at the front and ventilated 345 mm (13.6 in) discs with 2-piston calipers at the rear. The aluminium calipers feature Alpina lettering with classic Alpina Blue colour.

The suspension system is mostly based on the donor car but features adjustable dampers and Eibach springs which are 45 percent stiffer. The system also features Alpina specific roll bars. The car has Michelin Pilot Sport tyres with 20-inch multi-spoke alloy wheels.

The car also includes Alpina tuned Sports steering and an optional limited slip differential. The company claims a combined fuel economy of 37.2 mpg.

The interior includes Alpina specific sports seats and BMW iDrive infotainment system as standard equipment with USB and Bluetooth connectivity. A Harman Kardon sound system, an in-car TV and a head-up display are optional. The company gives the customer a choice of five leather and veneer trims for the interior.

== Performance ==
The B3 can accelerate from 0–100 km/h (0–62 mph) in 4.2 seconds (4.3 seconds for the wagon version) and can reach a top speed of 306 km/h (190 mph) (303 km/h (188 mph) for the wagon). The B3 can accelerate from 48–113 km/h (30–70 mph) in 4.2 seconds in third gear, 5.3 seconds in fourth gear and 7.3 seconds in fifth gear.

== Variants ==
=== D3 ===
The D3 is the diesel powered variant of the B3. Unveiled at the 2013 Frankfurt Motor Show, the D3 is based on the 330d and utilises a modified version of its 335d 3.0-litre N57 inline-6 engine. The engine has received the same modification as the B3, those being a larger intercooler, Alpina specific ECU and wiring loom and a high-strength steel crankshaft. These modifications allow the engine to generate 350 PS (257 kW; 345 hp) at 4,000 rpm and 700 N⋅m (516 lb⋅ft) of torque. The engine is mated to the same 8-speed automatic transmission as found on the B3 with a limited slip differential available as an option. Like the B3, the D3 is available in either a saloon or a wagon body style.

The engine delivers its peak torque from 1,500 rpm to 3,000 rpm and has a red-line of 4,800 rpm. The transmission features buttons for shifting gears mounted behind the steering column and has the same gear ratios as the donor car.

The suspension system is the same as the B3 and features 40 percent stiffer springs as well as the wheels and tyres. The dampers are set to be softer in compression and firmer in rebound. The bushings and anti-rollbars are Alpina specific and the car's front sub-frame and strut-brace have been modified to accommodate the engine.

There are four exterior colour choices available, those being Classic Alpina Green, Classic Alpina Blue, Sapphire Black and Mineral White with optional Alpina pinstripes.

The D3 can be ordered with any option available on the standard 3 Series. Along with Alpina's own options of interior trim and leather upholstery.

The D3 can accelerate from 0–97 km/h (0–60 mph) in a claimed 4.6 seconds and can attain a claimed maximum speed of 278 km/h (173 mph). The car has a claimed combined fuel economy of 53.3 mpg.

=== B3 S ===
Introduced at the 2017 Geneva Motor Show, the B3 S is the high performance variant of the B3. The 3.0-litre single-turbocharged inline-6 engine found in the B3 is further modified to generate 441 PS (324 kW; 435 hp) and 660 N⋅m (487 lb⋅ft) of torque.

The transmission remains the same as in the standard B3 along with interior and exterior options.

Performance figures include a 0–97 km/h (0–60 mph) acceleration time of 4.0 seconds (4.1 seconds for the wagon), although Auto Motor und Sport measured 3.8 seconds or the B3 S Touring Allrad, and a top speed of 306 km/h (190 mph). Unlike the B3, the B3 S is based on the updated 340i, but still uses the N55 engine.

== Gallery ==
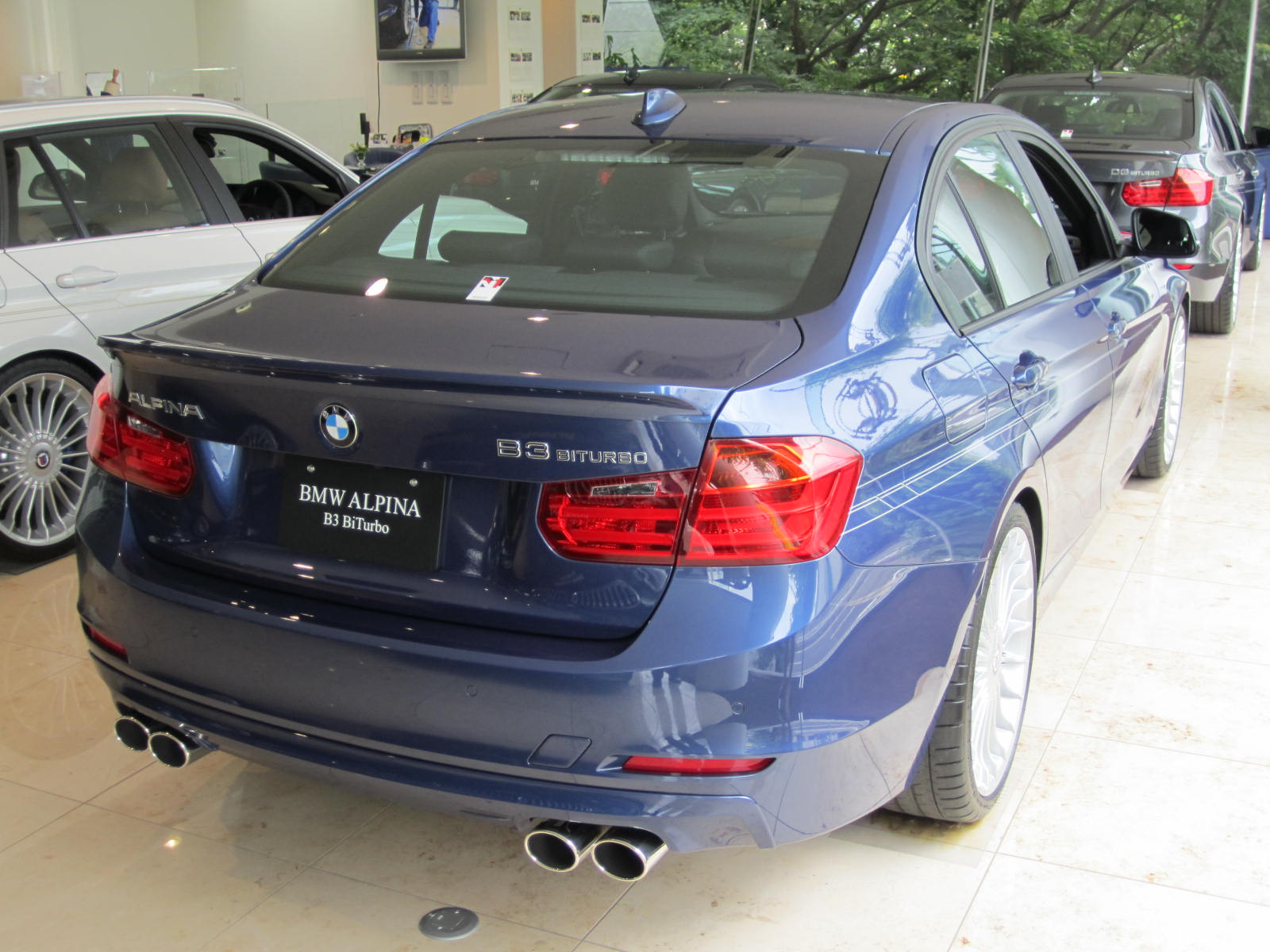
Alpina B3 (F30)

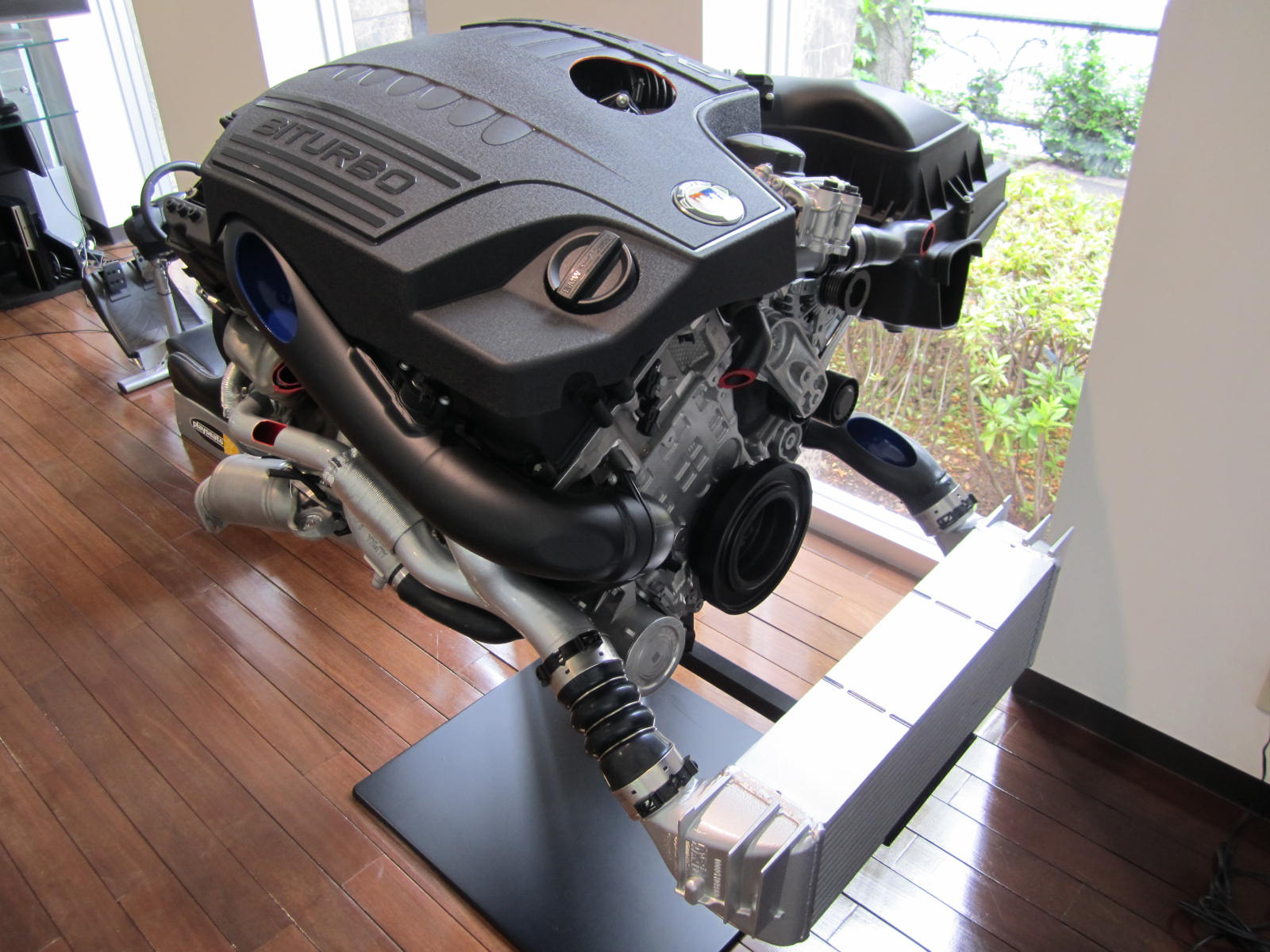
Engine

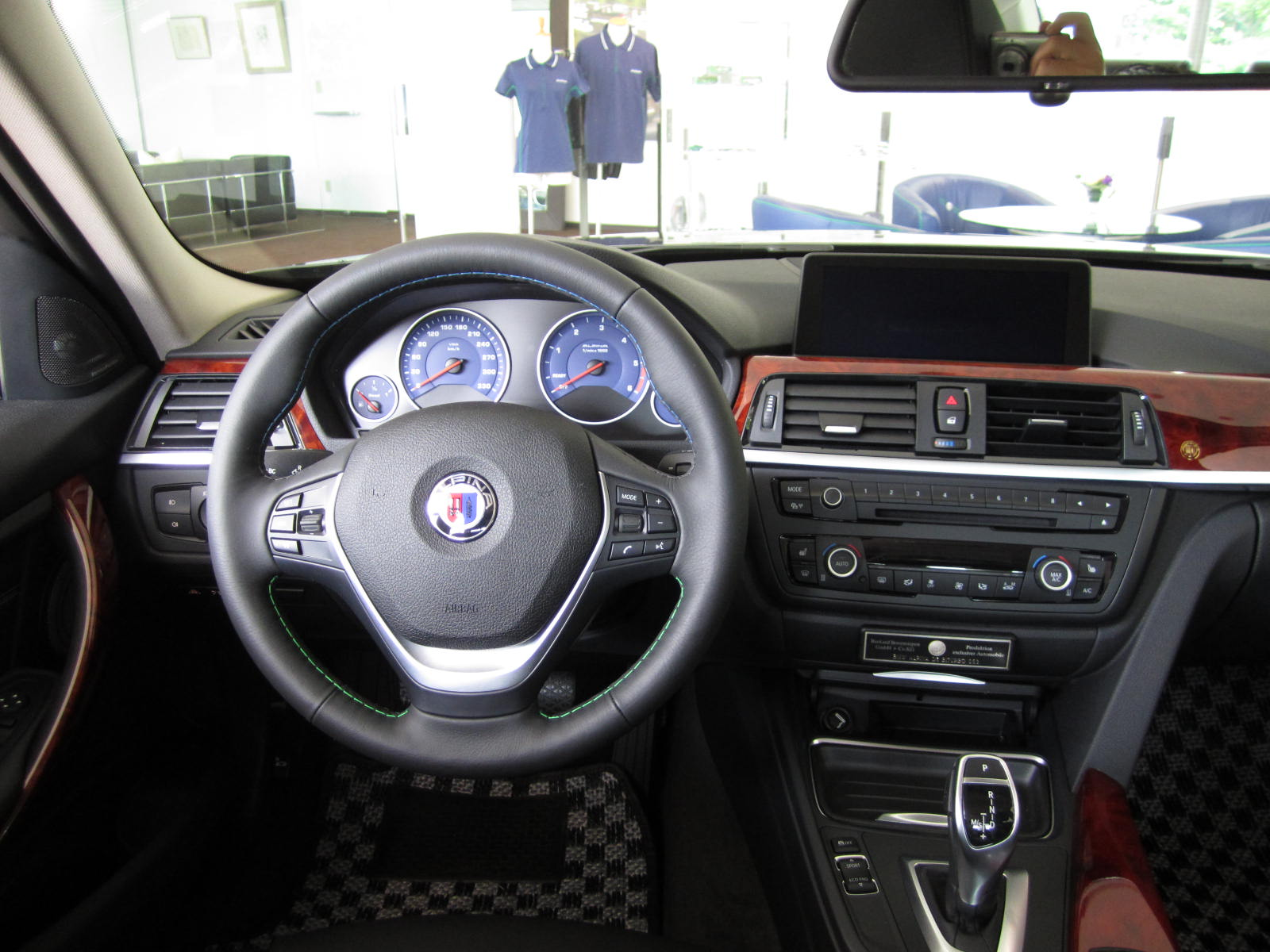
Interior

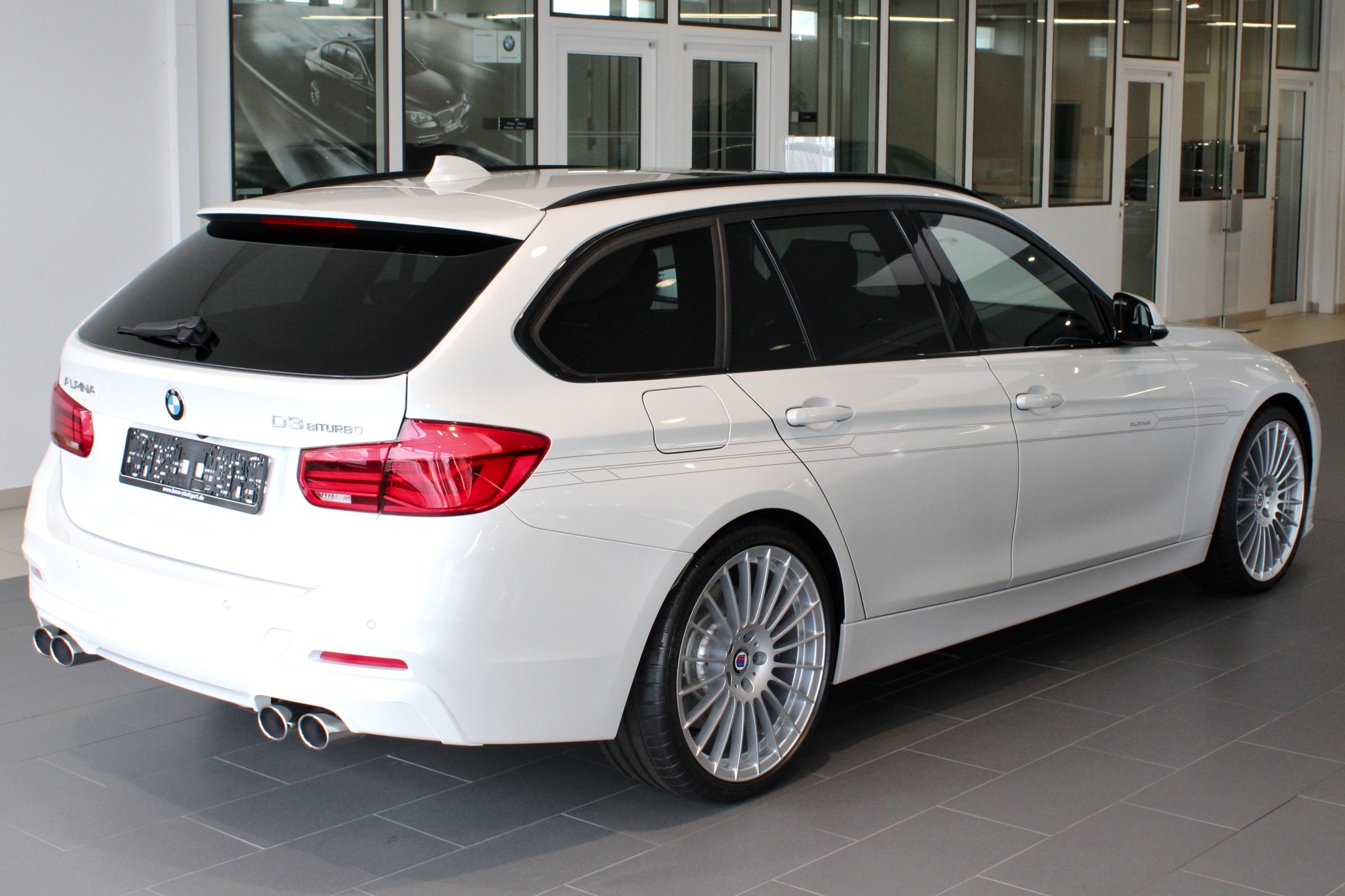
Alpina D3 (F31)
