= Alpina B4 =

Alpina B4 and D4
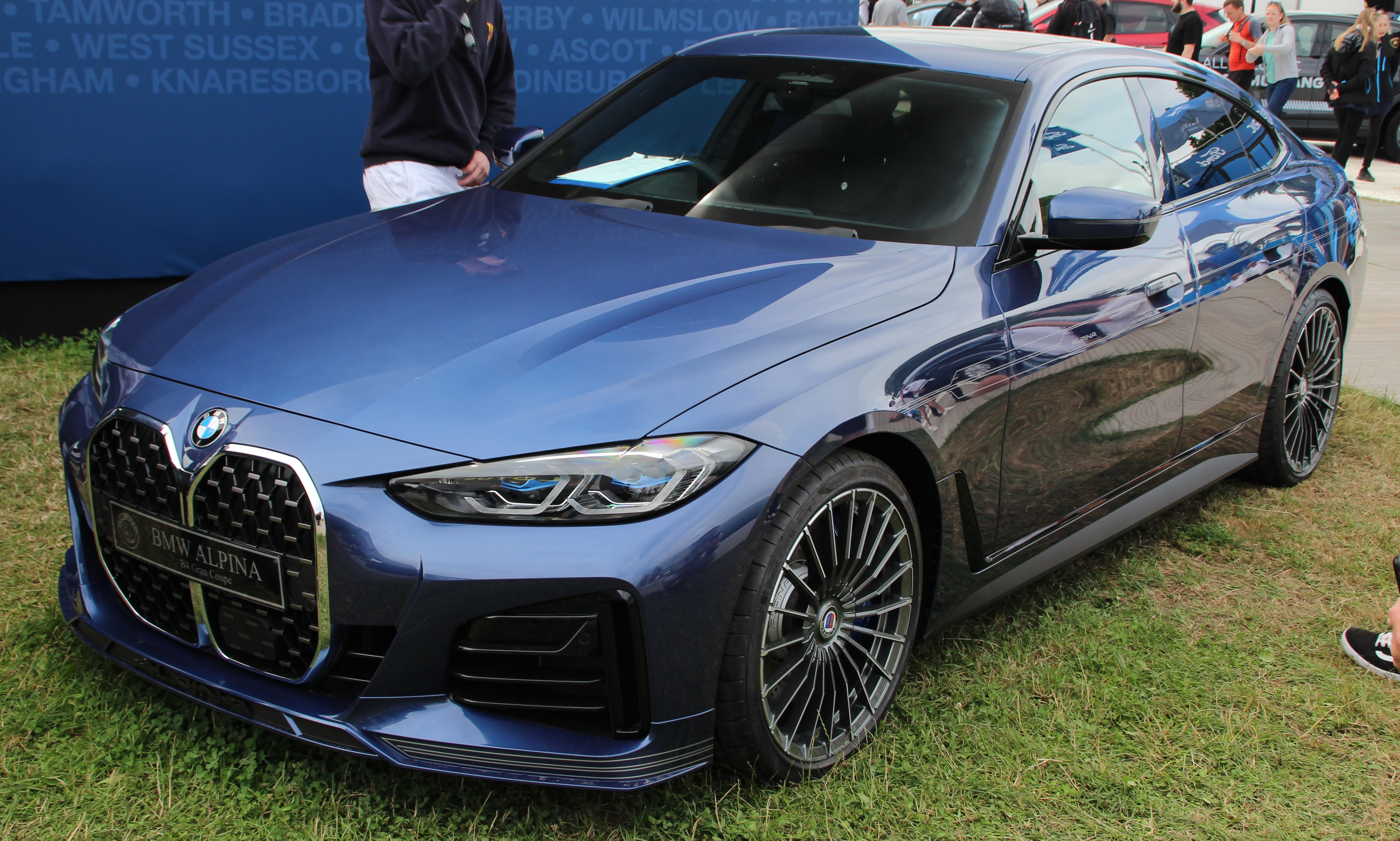
- 2022 Alpina B4 (G26)

Overview
- Manufacturer: Alpina
- Production: 2014–2025
- Assembly: Germany: Buchloe

Body and chassis
- Class: Compact executive car (D)
- Body style: 2-door coupé 2-door retractable hard-top convertible 4-door saloon
- Layout: Front-engine, rear-wheel-drive/all-wheel-drive (xDrive)
- Related: BMW 4 Series (F32); Alpina B3 (F30)

Powertrain
- Engine: Petrol: 3.0 L BMW N55 twin-turbo I6; Diesel: 3.0 L BMW N57 turbodiesel I6
- Transmission: 8-speed ZF 8HP70 automatic

Dimensions
- Wheelbase: 2,810 mm (110.6 in)
- Length: 4,638 mm (182.6 in)
- Width: 1,825 mm (71.9 in)
- Height: 1,377 mm (54.2 in)
- Kerb weight: Coupé: 1,690 kg (3,726 lb) (dry) 1,700 kg (3,748 lb) (with fluids); Convertible: 1,840 kg (4,057 lb) (dry)

Chronology
- Predecessor: Alpina B3 (E90)

The Alpina B4 and Alpina D4 are high-performance compact executive cars manufactured by the German automobile manufacturer, Alpina. Based on the BMW 4 Series, the B4 and D4 are manufactured in coupé and convertible body styles. The first generation B4 and D4 were launched in 2014 and the more powerful B4 S was launched in 2017.

== First generation (F32/F33; 2014) ==
Introduced at the 2013 Tokyo Motor Show, the B4 is based on the outgoing 435i. The N55 straight-six engine was modified by using twin-turbochargers, a 61 percent larger intercooler and a new crankshaft. The engine also utilized new pistons; all of these modifications allow the engine to generate 408 PS (300 kW; 402 hp) between 5,550 and 6,250 rpm and 601 N⋅m (443 lb⋅ft) between 3,000 and 4,000 rpm. The engine is mated to a ZF 8HP70 "Touch tronic" paddle shift automatic transmission, with no manual transmission options available. The transmission was modified to provide better shift timing. There were options for either a rear-wheel-drive or all-wheel-drive drivetrain. The car has three driving modes "Comfort", "Sport" and "Sport +", which depend on the tweaking of the power delivered by the engine and suspension system settings according to the driving conditions.

The suspension system is a carryover from the D3 but has a 40 percent higher work rate. The B4 has adjustable dampers that can be calibrated to provide a softer compression but firmer rebound. The suspension system also has new bushings and anti-rollbars.

The car has a Brembo braking system with 370 mm (14.6 in) front and 345 mm (13.6 in) rear brake discs working in conjunction with four piston callipers at the front and two piston callipers at the rear. The callipers are painted in a shade called Alpina blue. The car also features special 20-inch Alpina classic multi-spoke wheels and Michelin Pilot super sport tires developed specially for the car.

The car is identical to the 435i on the exterior but includes Alpina badging, front and rear lip spoilers and a new rear bumper. The B4 has an Akrapovič stainless steel exhaust system with quad exhaust pipes. The B4 comes in four different colours: Classic Alpina Blue, Classic Alpina Green, Sapphire Black and Mineral White with optional Alpina pinstripes, it is also available in any of the colours offered by BMW Individual.

The interior has Lavalina leather upholstery, which can be tailored to customer specifications, and sports adjustable seats, a hand-stitched steering wheel and new door sills. The car retains the iDrive system from the donor car but has new Alpina gauges and Alpina badging on the steering wheel, headrests and floor mats.

=== Performance ===
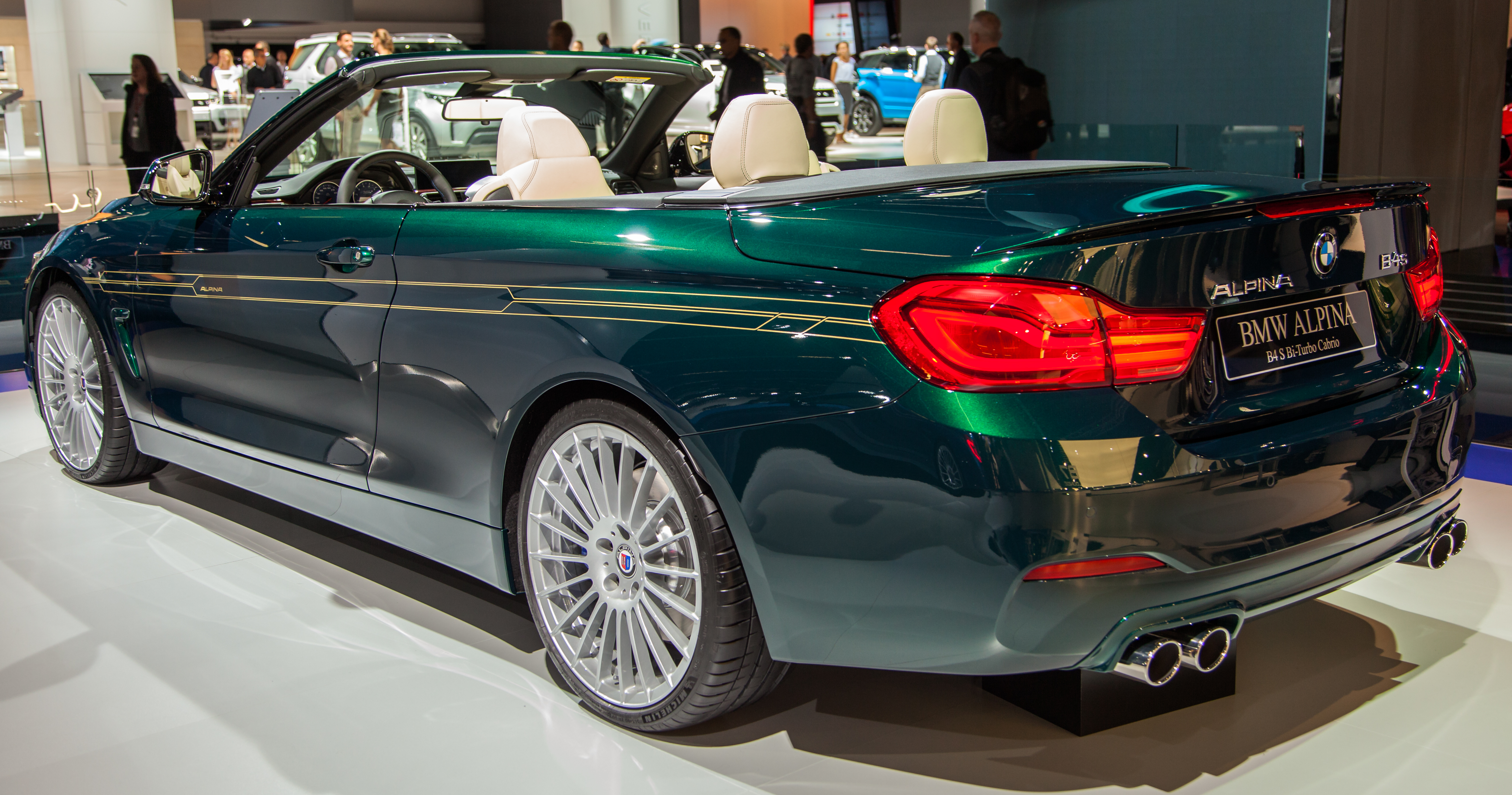
B4 convertible

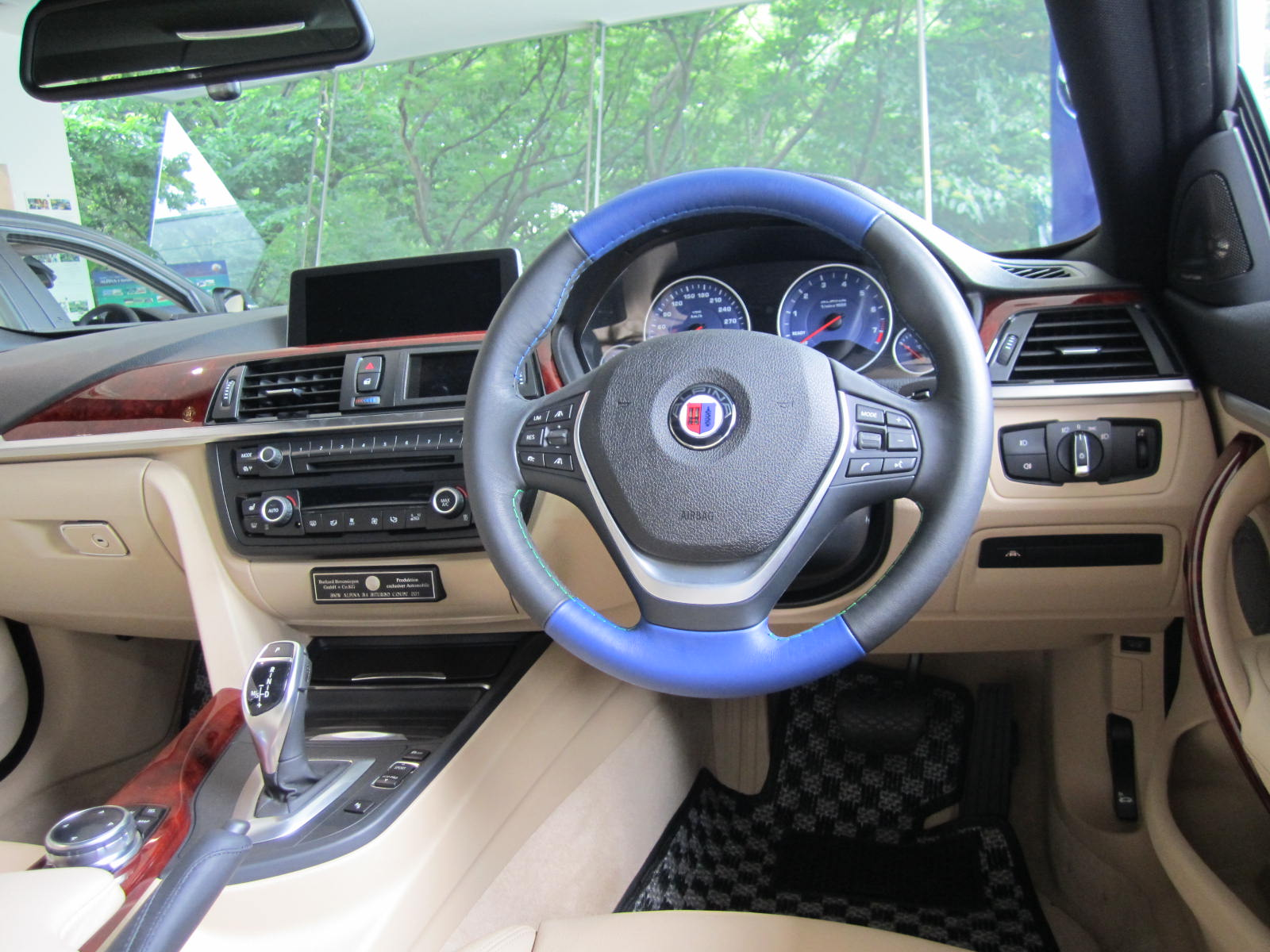
Interior

The B4 accelerates from 0–97 km/h (0–60 mph) in 4.2 seconds with rear-wheel-drive and in 4.0 seconds with the all-wheel-drive, the convertible accelerates to the same speed in 4.5 seconds. The coupé has a maximum speed of 303 km/h (188 mph) while the convertible has a maximum speed of 301 km/h (187 mph).

=== Variants ===
==== D4 ====
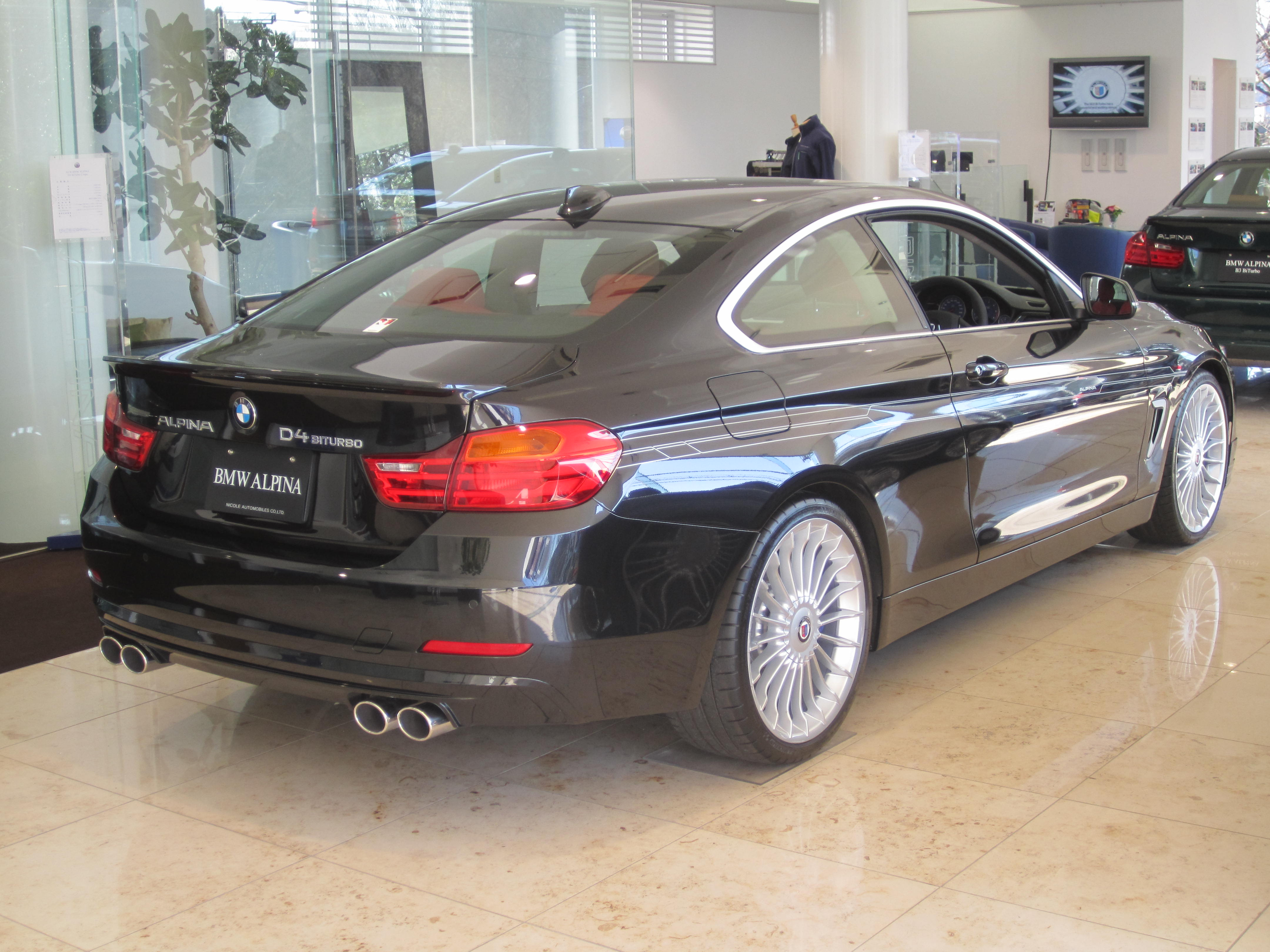
Alpina D4

The D4 is the diesel variant of the B4. Based on the 435d, the N57 turbo diesel inline-6 engine found in the donor car was slightly modified by introducing a new intercooler and a different engine ECU mapping. These modifications allowed the engine to generate 350 PS (257 kW; 345 hp) at 4,000 rpm and 700 N⋅m (516 lb⋅ft) of torque between 1,500 rpm and 3,000 rpm. The engine is mounted to the same 8-speed automatic transmission as utilized in the B4. The D4 like the B4 is available in coupé and convertible body styles, with the convertible weighing 130 kg (287 lb) more than the coupé. The D4 is equipped with an Akrapovič stainless steel exhaust system with quad exhaust pipes. On the interior, burled Elm wood trim, adjustable heated front seats, dual zone climate control and Dakota leather trim are standard equipment. A heads-up display and an array of choices for the upholstery and trim are optional. The car also comes with automatic headlights and wipers. 20-inch multi-spoke alloy wheels and Alpina pinstriping on the exterior are also optional.

The D4 can accelerate to 100 km/h (62 mph) in 4.6 seconds (5.0 seconds for the convertible), 0–161 km/h (0–100 mph) in 10 seconds and can attain a maximum speed of 278 km/h (173 mph) (275 km/h (171 mph) for the convertible).

==== B4 S ====
Introduced in 2017, the B4 S is a high performance variant of the B4, with further upgrades to the engine including 10 percent larger turbochargers, 20 percent larger intercoolers and an upgraded engine management system with 35 percent more capacity. All of these upgrades allow the engine to generate 440 PS (324 kW; 434 hp) between 5,500 and 6,250 rpm and 660 N⋅m (487 lb⋅ft) of torque at 3,000 rpm. The car features the same 8-speed automatic transmission as the standard B4. The suspension setup is relatively the same as the B4 but has new springs, dampers and toe-in tuning. The exhaust system is the same stainless steel Akrapovič unit as featured on the B4.

The B4 S features a new chin spoiler, a roof spoiler, Alpina pinstripes on the exterior as standard and the choice of Classic Alpina Blue, Sapphire Black, Mineral White and Classic Alpina Green exterior colors along with 20-inch classic Alpina multi-spoke alloy wheels with Michelin Pilot Sport 4S tyres.

On the interior, the B4 S features Dakota leather upholstery and BMW Professional infotainment system as standard having Merino leather upholstery as an option. The interior has Alpina badging and emblems throughout along with Alpina gauges.

The B4 S is lighter than the standard B4 and weighs 1,690 kg (3,726 lb). Performance is improved as well with a 0–100 km/h (0–62 mph) acceleration time of 4.2 seconds for the rear-wheel-drive drive-train and 4.0 seconds for the all-wheel-drive drive-train and can attain a top speed of 306 km/h (190 mph).

==== B4 S Edition 99 ====
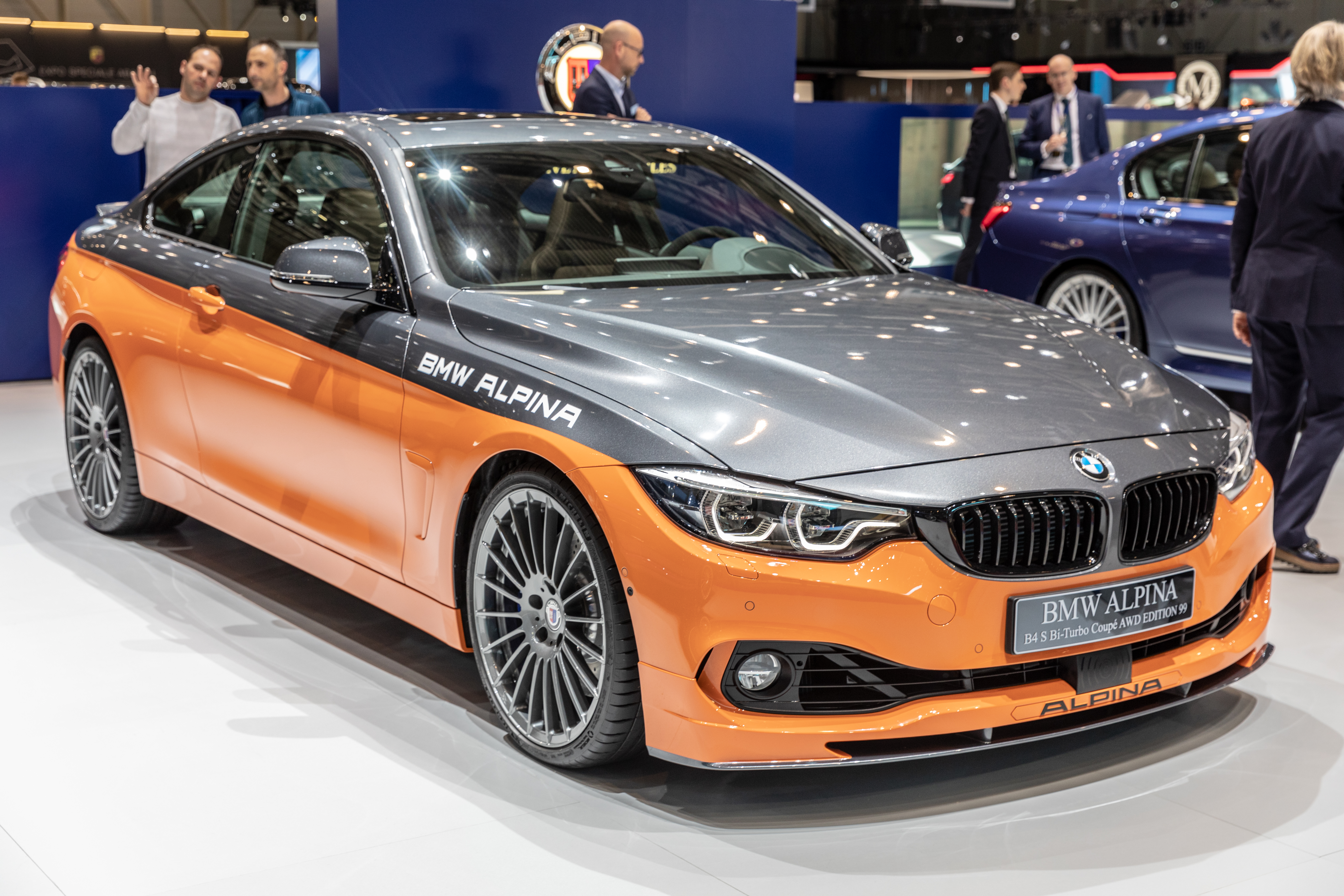
Alpina B4 S Edition 99 at the 2019 Geneva Motor Show.

Introduced in October 2018, the B4 S Edition 99 is a limited edition of the B4 S limited to 99 units. The 99 Edition received further engine upgrades and generates 452 PS (332 kW; 446 hp) between 5,500 and 6,250 rpm and 680 N⋅m (502 lb⋅ft) of torque between 3,000 and 4,500 rpm from its 3.0-litre twin-turbocharged straight six engine. The coupé with all-wheel-drive weighing 1,750 kg (3,858 lb) accelerates to 100 km/h (62 mph) from a standstill in 3.9 seconds and the 65 kg (143 lb) lighter rear-wheel-drive coupé accelerates to the same speed in one-tenth of a second longer than the all-wheel-drive coupé. The convertible accelerates to the same speed in 4.3 seconds. All of the versions have a top speed ranging from 303–306 km/h (188–190 mph).

Two new color options are available for the exterior, those being Fire Orange and Grigio Medio with black accents. A matte wrap is available as an option. The car is available with 20-inch classic Alpina multi-spoke alloy wheels in Ferric Gray finish.

The Edition 99 has a stiffer suspension system than the B4 S called the Alpina Sports Suspension Plus along with modified adjustable dampers. A limited slip differential and a torque vectoring system is available as an option.

The interior features piano black lacquer trim with "Edition" lettering, new sports seats, the shift paddles finished in matte black and a stainless steel plaque signifying the production number of the car out of the 99 units produced.

== Second generation (G26; 2022) ==
Second generation (G26)
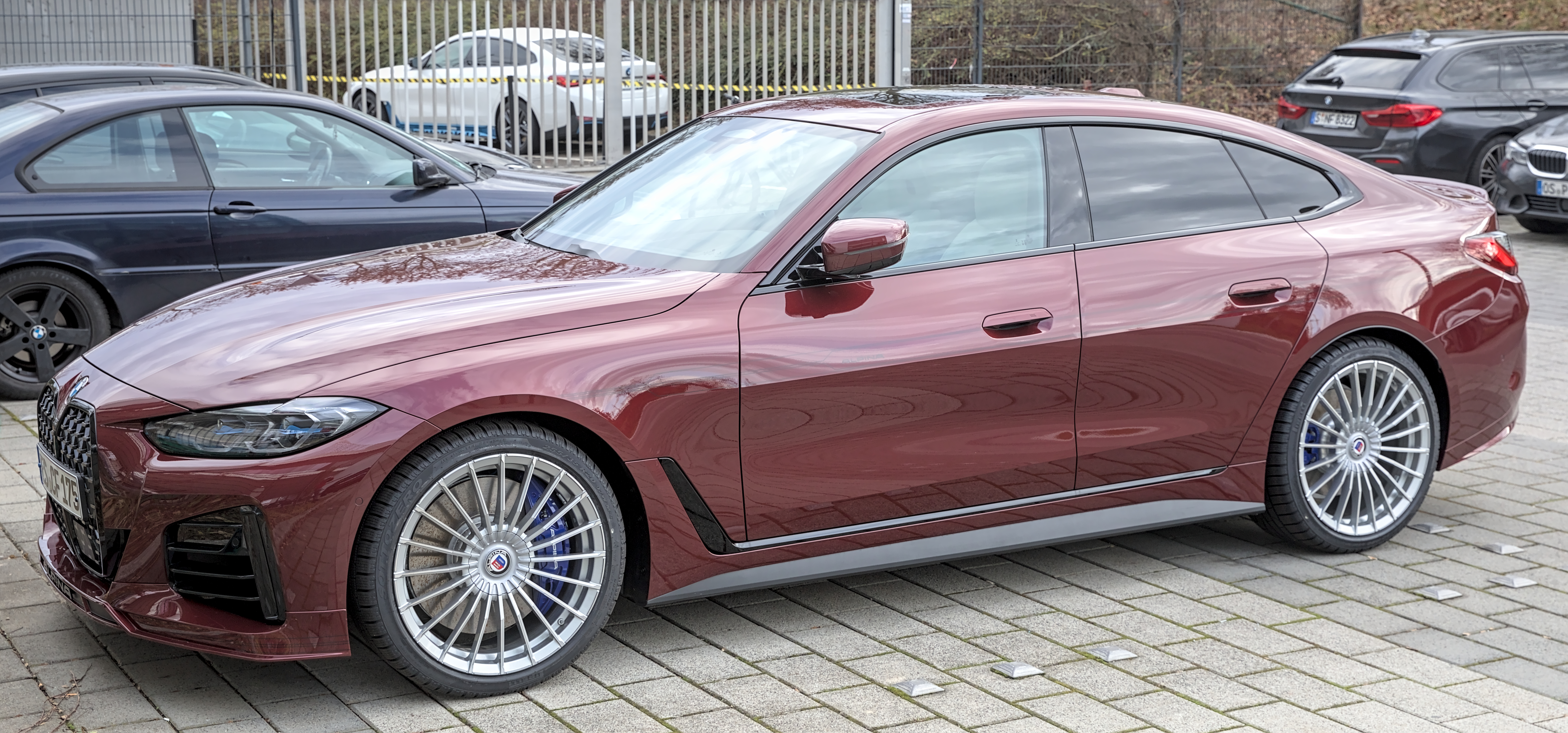
- Alpina B4 Gran Coupé (pre-facelift)

Overview
- Production: 2022–2025

Body and chassis
- Body style: 5-door liftback
- Related: BMW 4 Series (G22)

Powertrain
- Engine: Petrol: 3.0 L I6 turbo Diesel: B57 3.0 L I6 turbo (MHEV)

Dimensions
- Wheelbase: 2,856 mm (112.4 in)
- Length: 4,792 mm (188.7 in)
- Width: 1,850 mm (73 in)
- Height: 1,440 mm (57 in)
- Curb weight: 1,965 kg (4,332 lb)

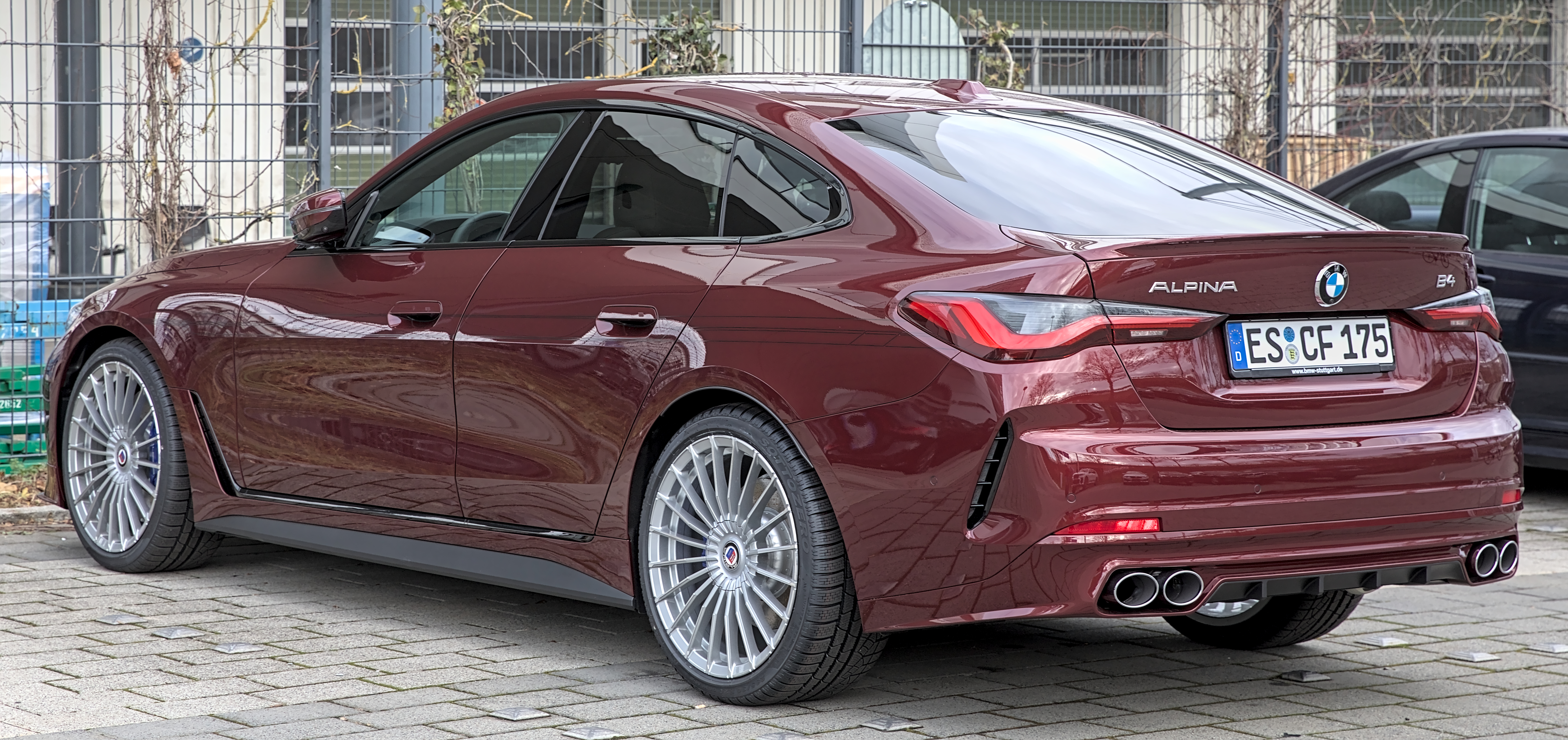
Rear view

While there is a sporty M variant of the two-door versions of the BMW 4 Series from BMW M, none are planned based on the Gran Coupé. Instead, Alpina presented the B4 Gran Coupé at the end of March 2022. It came onto the market in July 2022. A revised version of the B4 was presented in June 2024. It is scheduled to go on sale in November 2024.

=== Technical data ===
The three-liter petrol engine is based on the BMW S58, which the M versions of the four-series also use. Compared to the Alpina B3, which is also available, it is slightly more powerful with 364 kW (495 hp). The ZF eight-speed transmission has been reinforced, the sports chassis is specially connected and has weight-optimized components, and its own stabilizers on the front axle. The B4 Gran Coupé is said to accelerate to 100 km/h in 3.7 seconds, and the manufacturer states the top speed as 301 km/h. With the model update, the maximum power increased to 389 kW (529 hp).

	B4 Gran Coupé	B4 GT Gran Coupe
Order period	07/2022-06/2024	from 11/2024
Engine type	Petrol engine	
Engine type	R6	
Forced induction	Biturbo	
Displacement	2993 cm^{3}	
Compression ratio	9.3: 1	
max. power at min^{−1}	364 kW (495 PS)/5500–7000	389 kW (529 PS)/6250–6500
max. torque at min^{−1}	730 Nm/2500–4500	
Drive type, standard	All-wheel drive	
Gearbox type, standard	8-speed automatic transmission Switch-Tronic	
Curb weight	1965 kg	
Acceleration, 0–100 km/h	3.7 s	3.5 s
Acceleration, 0–200 km/h	11.6 s	
Top speed	301 km/h	305 km/h
Fuel consumption per 100 km, combined (NEDC/WLTP)	10.1 l Super Plus	10.5 l Super Plus
CO_{2} emissions, combined (NEFZ/WLTP)	229 g/km	239 g/km
Tank capacity	59 l	
Emissions standard according to EU classification	Euro 6d ISC-FCM	Euro 6e
