= Alpina B3 (E90) =

Alpina B3 and D3 (E90/E91/E92/E93)
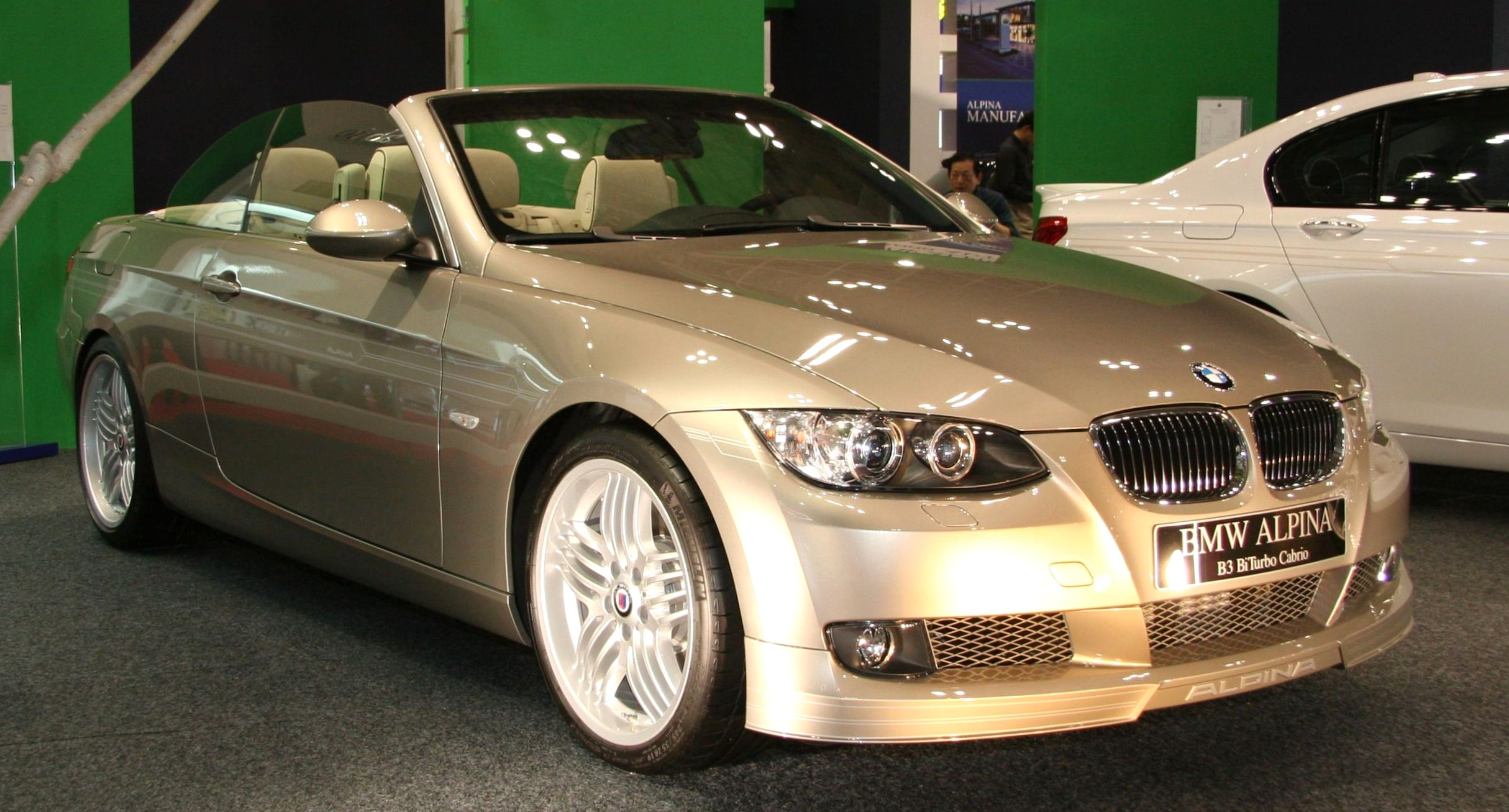
- Alpina B3 BiTurbo Cabrio (E93)

Overview
- Manufacturer: Alpina Burkard Bovensiepen GmbH & Co. KG
- Production: 2007–2013
- Assembly: Germany: Buchloe

Body and chassis
- Class: Compact executive car (D)
- Body style: 2-door coupé; 2-door retractable hard top convertible; 4-door saloon; 5-door station wagon
- Layout: Front-engine, rear-wheel-drive/Front-engine, all-wheel-drive
- Related: BMW 3 Series (E90); BMW 1 Series (E87)

Powertrain
- Engine: Petrol: 3.0 L N54 twin-turbocharged I6; Diesel: 2.0 L BMW N47 turbo diesel I4
- Transmission: 6-speed ZF 6HP19 automatic

Dimensions
- Wheelbase: 2,760 mm (109 in)
- Length: 4,520–4,610 mm (178–181 in)
- Width: 1,780–1,820 mm (70–72 in)
- Height: 1,380–1,420 mm (54–56 in)
- Curb weight: Saloon: 1,645 kg (3,627 lb) (curb) 2,090 kg (4,608 lb) (maximum); Wagon: 1,750 kg (3,858 lb) (curb) 2,200 kg (4,850 lb) (maximum); Coupé: 1,570 kg (3,461 lb) (curb) 2,090 kg (4,608 lb) (maximum); Convertible: 1,845 kg (4,068 lb) (curb) 2,200 kg (4,850 lb) (maximum)

Chronology
- Predecessor: Alpina B3 (E46)
- Successor: Alpina B3 (F30); Alpina B4

The Alpina B3 (E90) and Alpina D3 (E90) are a series of high performance compact executive cars manufactured by German automobile manufacturer Alpina from 2007 to 2013. Based on the BMW 3 Series (E90), the B3 and D3 were available in coupé, saloon, convertible (not available for the D3) and station wagon body styles. The B3 was officially unveiled at the 2007 Geneva Motor Show. The coupé debuted the following summer at the Goodwood Festival of Speed, and the convertible debuted at the IAA 2007.

== Development and introduction ==
Development of the B3 began in 2006. At that time, it was speculated that the car would either be introduced with a 4.4-litre supercharged V8 engine (already used in the B5, B6 and B7) or a naturally aspirated V8 engine (as used in the 550i and 750i). The supercharger would've been Alpina's own design. Both of these speculations were nullified when the car was introduced in 2007 as it utilised a modified version of the BMW N54 inline-6 engine used in the 335i. The B3 was available with rear-wheel-drive or all-wheel-drive drivetrains. The cars equipped with the all-wheel-drive (BMW xDrive) system were called Allrad.

The engine was modified by the addition of an Alpina specific ECU, oil cooler and lighter and stronger MAHLE pistons. These modifications allowed the engine to generate 360 PS (265 kW; 355 hp) between 5,500 rpm to 6,000 rpm and 500 N⋅m (369 lb⋅ft) of torque at 3,800 rpm to 5,000 rpm. The engine has a red-line of 7,000 rpm. The engine was mated to a 6-speed ZF automatic transmission paired with a control system called Switch Tronic. The control system was first introduced by the company in 1993 and has a manual mode which allows the driver to change gears either by the gear lever or by buttons present behind the steering wheel. Shift times had been significantly improved, taking 100 milliseconds to shift gears.

The company re-introduced one of their signature exterior colours for the B3 namely Alpina Green as Alpina Green II. However, the car could be ordered in any colour out of the standard exterior colours as offered on its predecessor. The exterior changes included optional Alpina pinstripes, a front spoiler with Alpina lettering, a rear lip spoiler and a lightweight Akrapovic stainless steel exhaust system with quad exhaust tips. The exhaust system had a floating tip design, a first to be used on an Alpina vehicle. Buyers were offered a choice of three 20-spoke alloy wheels: 18 or 19-inch "Classic" (8" and 9" wide) and 19-inch "Dynamic" (set of 5 quadruple spokes, 8.5" and 9.5" wide). Facelift versions had additional "Classic C10" option in 19" (widths remained as in the original ones).

The interior includes Alpina logos and lettering, Alpina side sills, heated sport seats, wood trim, Lavalina leather upholstery, cruise control, Alpina floor mats and Alpina gauges with the speedometer reading up to 306 km/h (190 mph) on the European models. The interior could be customised to the customer specifications by the Alpina interior department.

The suspension system of the B3 utilised a mixture of in-house developed components and BMW components. The coupé and cabriolet version used the shocks from the 335i Sport, while the Saloon and Wagon variants used the shocks as found on the standard 335i. The coil springs as found on the 335i Sport are used throughout the B3 versions. The rear subframe bushings are the same as those found on the 335d, while the secondary springs used are a mixture of those found on the 335xd and 335i Sport. The front stabilisers are the same as used on the 335i Sport, while the rear stabilisers are bespoke units which are smaller than those found on the 335i. The use of different stabilisers allow for a better turn in and safe cornering. The suspension geometry is shared with the D3.

The tyres used on the B3 are Michelin Pilot Sport tyres measuring 245/35 ZR19 at the front and 265/35 ZR19 at the rear, different to the sizes of D3 - 235/35 and 265/30, for 19". Later version - D3 Biturbo - used B3 sizes.

== Performance ==
The B3 can accelerate from 0–100 km/h (0–62 mph) in 4.8 seconds (5.0 seconds for the convertible, 4.9 seconds for the wagon) and can reach a claimed top speed of 285 km/h (177 mph) (278 km/h (173 mph) for the convertible).

Tested performance figures are as follows:

- 0–48 km/h (0–30 mph): 2.39 seconds
- 0–64 km/h (0–40 mph): 3.30 seconds
- 0–80 km/h (0–50 mph): 4.15 seconds
- 0–97 km/h (0–60 mph): 5.17 seconds
- 0–113 km/h (0–70 mph): 6.51 seconds
- 0–129 km/h (0–80 mph): 7.96 seconds
- 0–145 km/h (0–90 mph): 9.57 seconds
- 0–161 km/h (0–100 mph): 11.57 seconds

== Variants ==
=== D3 ===
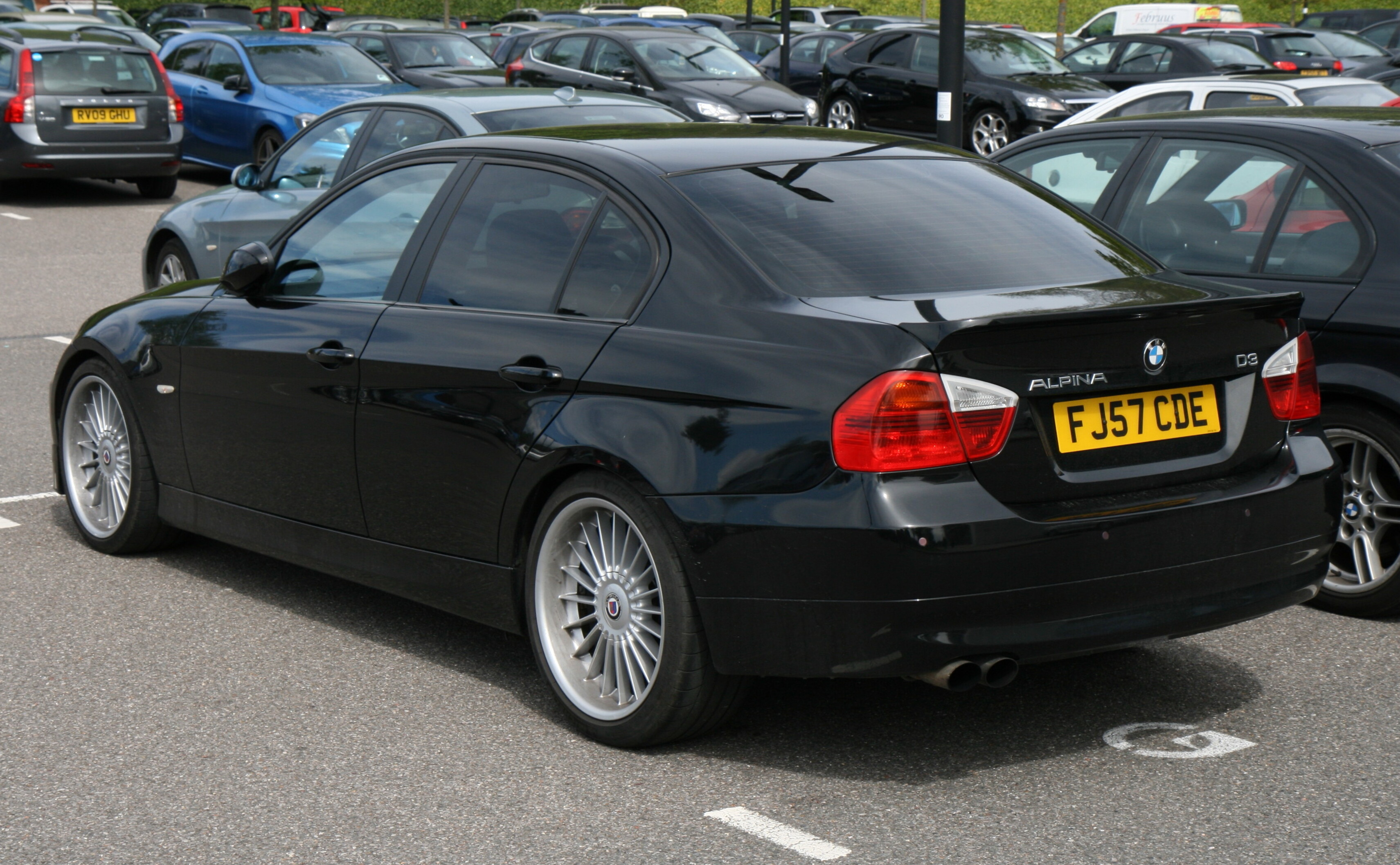
Alpina D3 (E90)

The D3 is the diesel powered variant of the B3. It is based on the 320d but utilises a modified version of the N47 inline-4 diesel engine as found on the 123d. The reason to use this engine was to have high performance while maintaining a good fuel economy. The engine received the same modifications as on the B3 with the only difference being the cat back exhaust system having dual exhaust tips instead of quad. The modifications allow the engine to generate 214 PS (157 kW; 211 hp) and 450 N⋅m (332 lb⋅ft) of torque between 2,000 and 2,500 rpm.

The D3 is claimed to be more fuel efficient than its 3 Series diesel counterparts (those being the 325d and 335d). The D3 has BMW efficient dynamics system, a start/stop system, a decoupling alternator and active aerodynamics as standard. Unlike the B3, the D3 was not offered in the convertible body style.

The use of the inline-4 engine allows the car to be lighter than the donor car, the difference being 100 kg (220 lb) in terms of weight. It also allows the car to have better handling than its counterparts also made possible due to non-run flat tyres.

Performance figures include a 0–100 km/h (0–62 mph) acceleration time of 6.9 seconds and a top speed of 245 km/h (152 mph).

=== B3 S ===
2010 Alpina B3 S BiTurbo

The B3 S is a high performance variant of the B3. Introduced at the 2010 Geneva Motor Show, the B3 S has a redesigned front spoiler, 19-inch wheels from the B7 and a new rear diffuser. The engine received a new ECU, resulting in a power increase to 400 PS (294 kW; 395 hp) at 6,000 rpm and 540 N⋅m (398 lb⋅ft) of torque at 4,500 rpm. The engine has a compression ratio of 9.4:1 and a peak boost pressure of 1.2 bar. The B3 S saw a performance improvement over the B3, including a 0–100 km/h (0–62 mph) acceleration time of 4.7 seconds (0.1 seconds more for the wagon and 0.2 seconds more for the convertible with the roof closed) and a top speed of 303 km/h (188 mph) (299 km/h (186 mph) for the convertible with the roof closed and 298 km/h (185 mph) for the wagon). The B3 S had wider tyres than the B3, measuring 245/40 ZR18 at the front and 265/40 ZR18 at the rear. The interior options remained the same as on the standard B3.

=== B3 GT3 ===
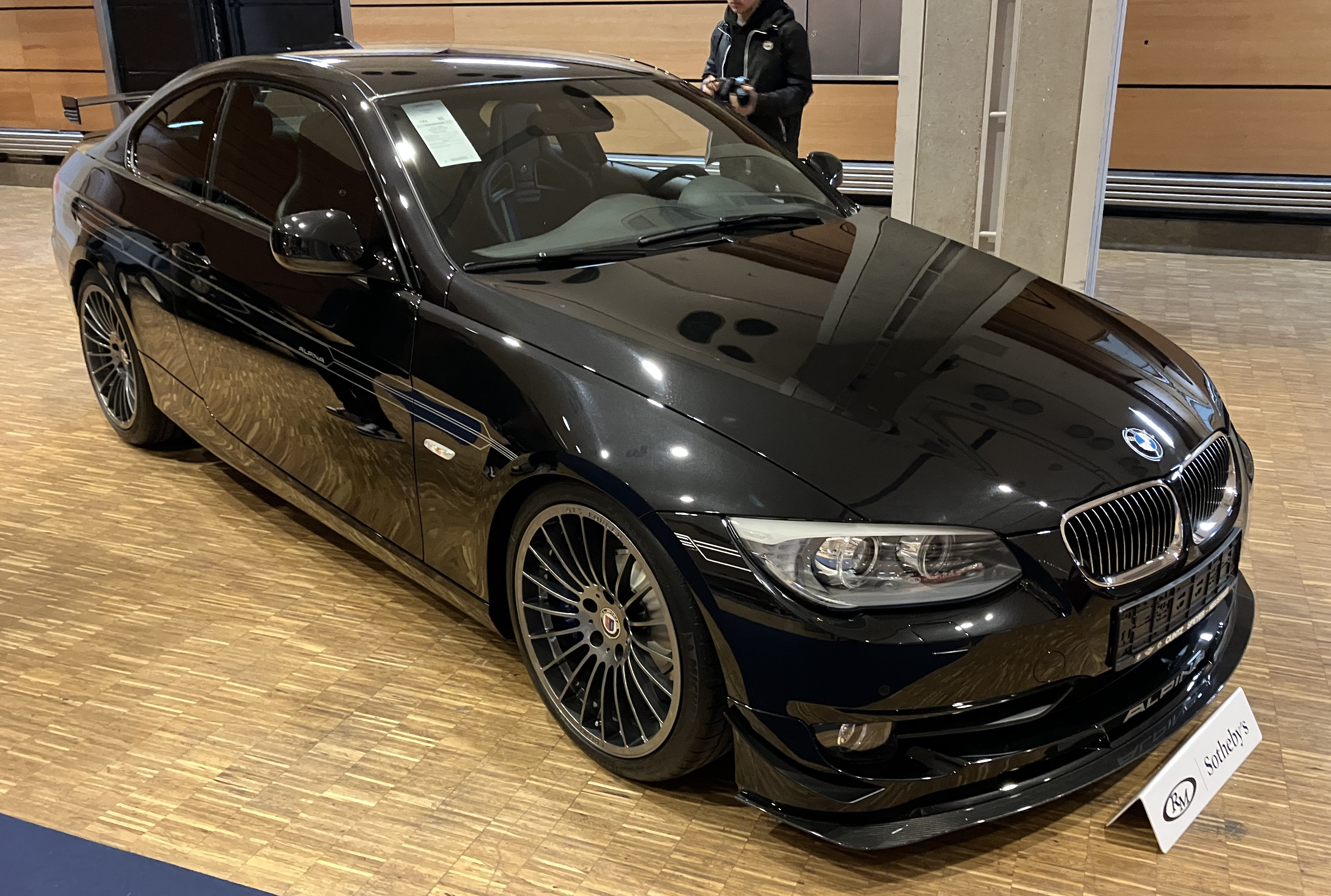

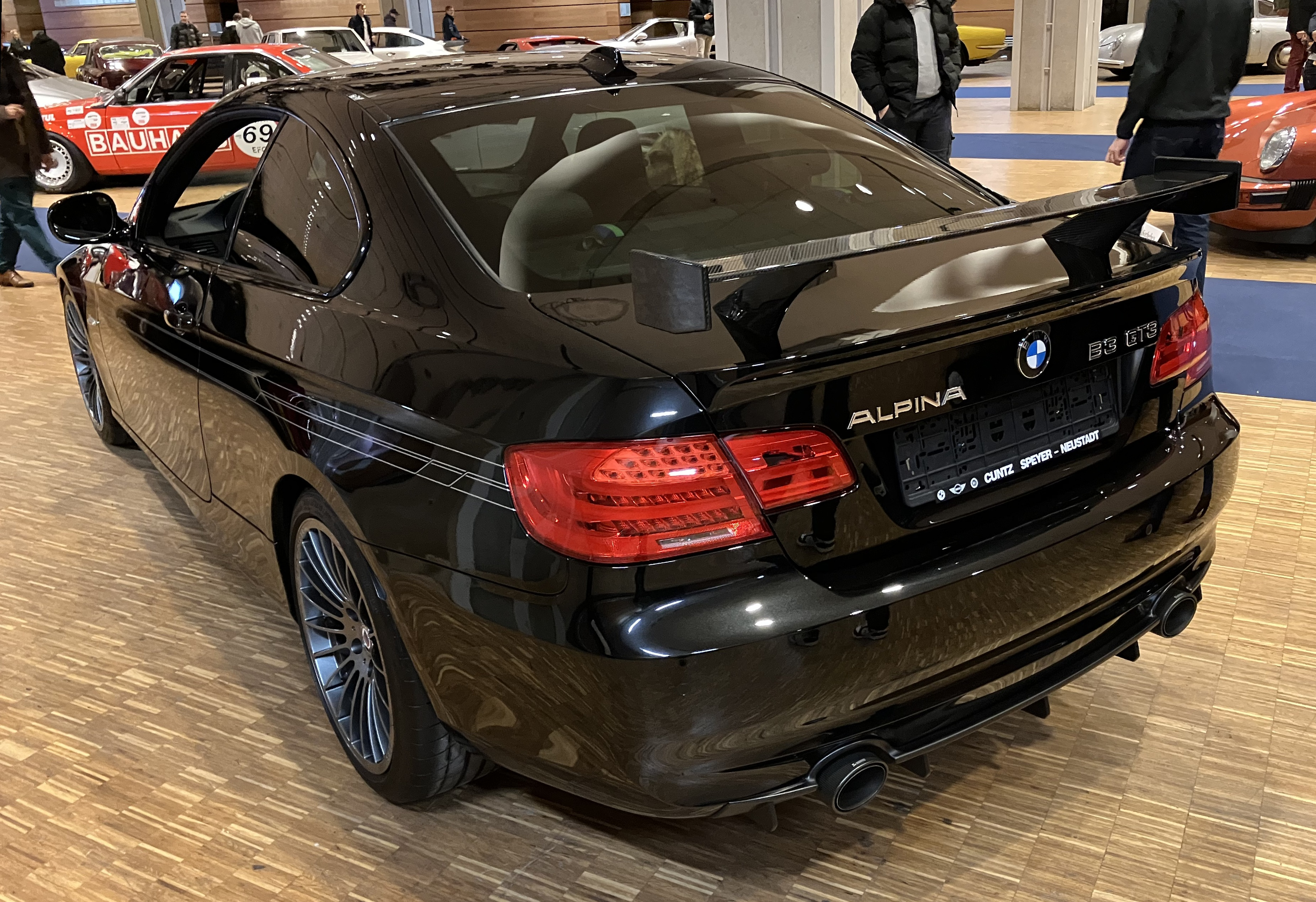
B3 GT3

The B3 GT3 is a high performance variant of the B3 S. Available only in the coupé bodystyle, the GT3 commemorates Alpina's return to motorsport and celebrates their victory in the 2011 ADAC GT Masters with an Alpina B6 GT3. The N54 inline-6 engine as used in the B3 S is modified by the addition of an Akrapovic titanium exhaust system and generates 408 PS (300 kW; 402 hp) at 6,000 rpm and 540 N⋅m (398 lb⋅ft) of torque at 4,500 rpm. The GT3 has a track-oriented coilover suspension system developed by KW, with 12 settings of damper compression and 18 settings of damper rebound along with a lowered ride height.

The GT3 is fitted with 19-inch black forged multi-spoke alloy wheels finished in Himalaya Grey, weighing less than 10 kg (22 lb). The brakes have rotors measuring 380 mm (15 in) front and aft with six-piston callipers. The car has a Drexler mechanical limited slip differential as standard. The exterior changes included a new front spoiler, front canards, a larger rear diffuser and a fixed rear wing.

The GT3 had a limited production run of 99 units. Performance figures included a 0–100 km/h (0–62 mph) acceleration time of 4.5 seconds and a claimed top speed of 299 km/h (186 mph).

== Gallery ==
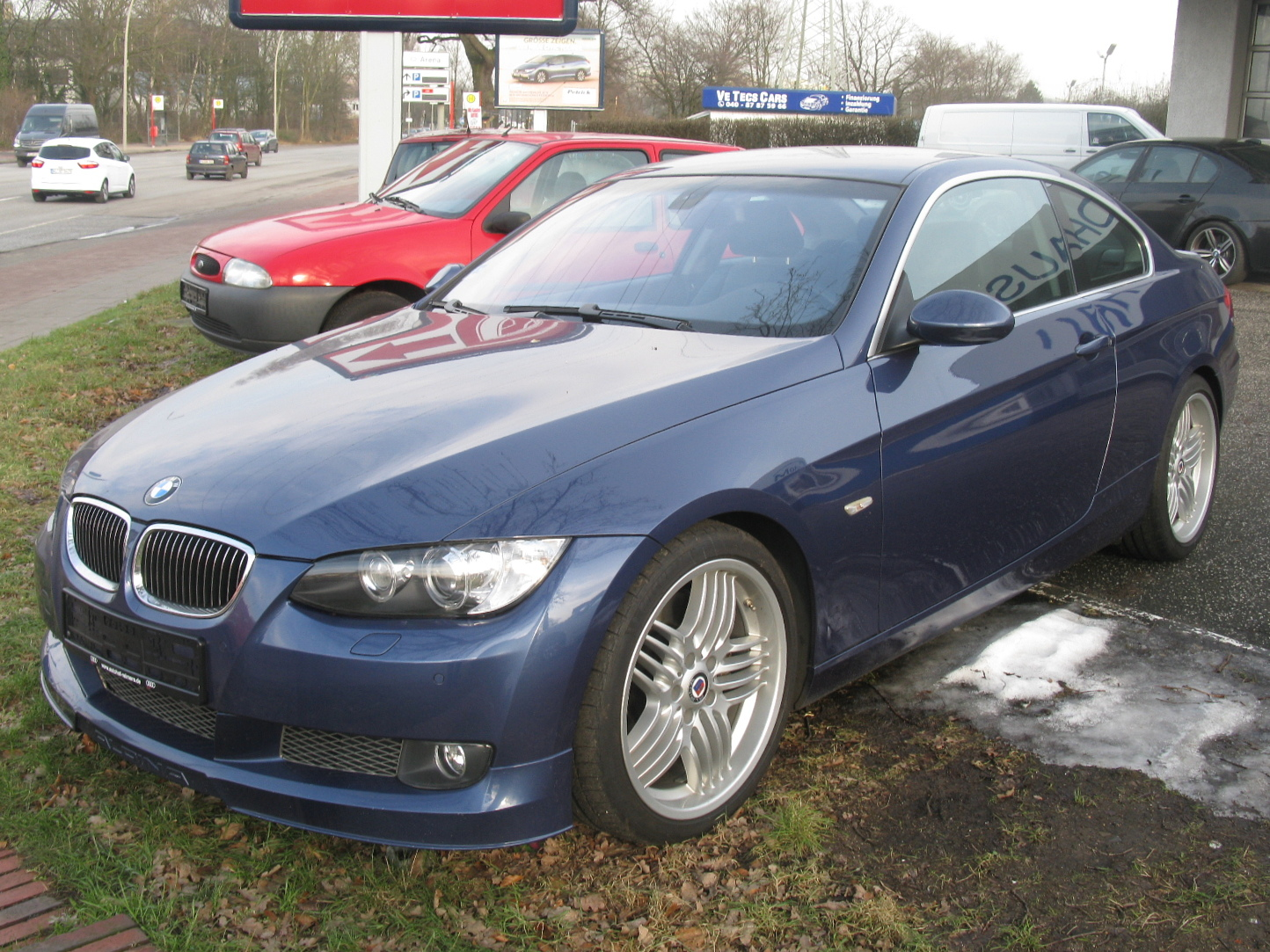
B3 (E92)

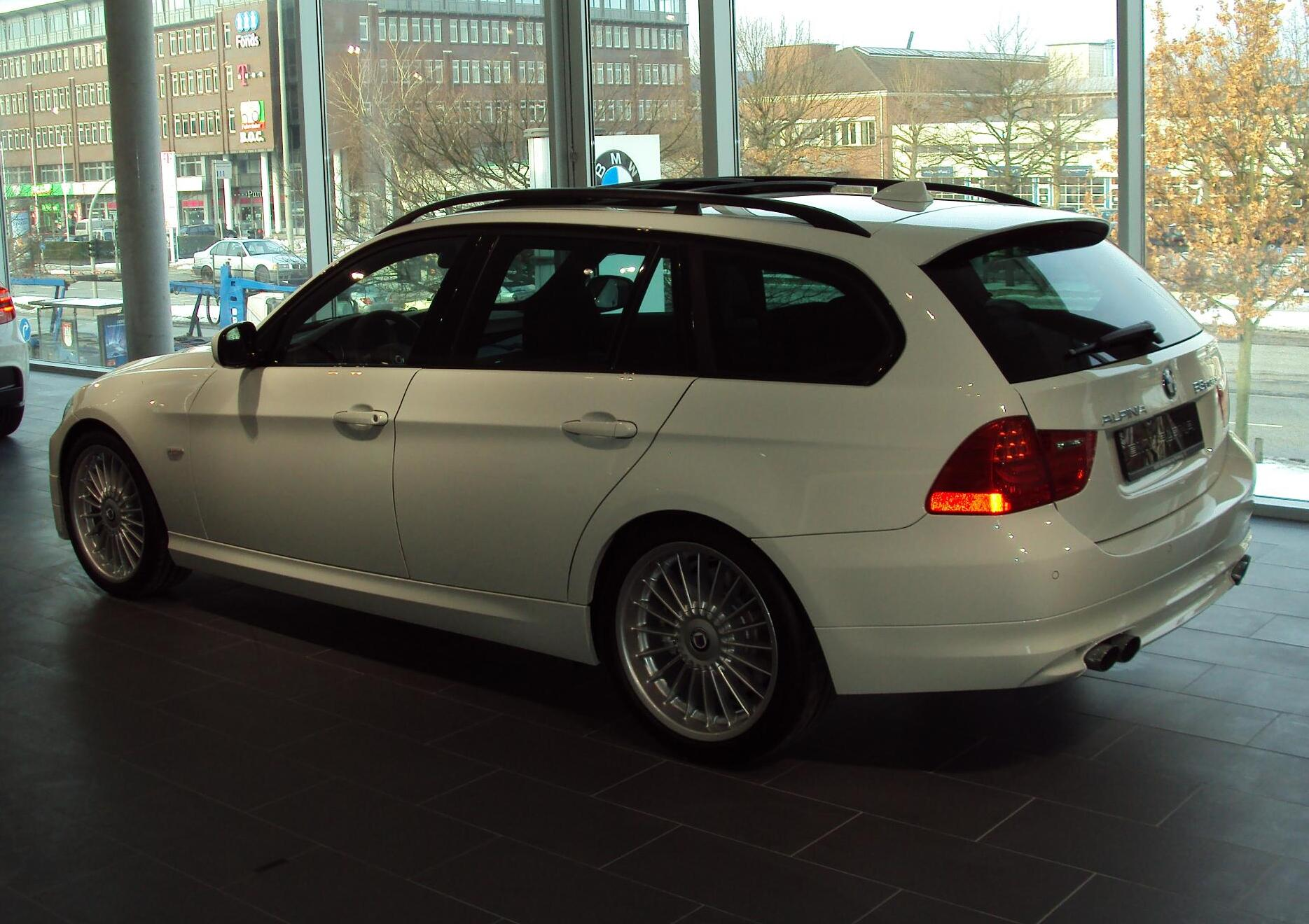
B3 (E91)

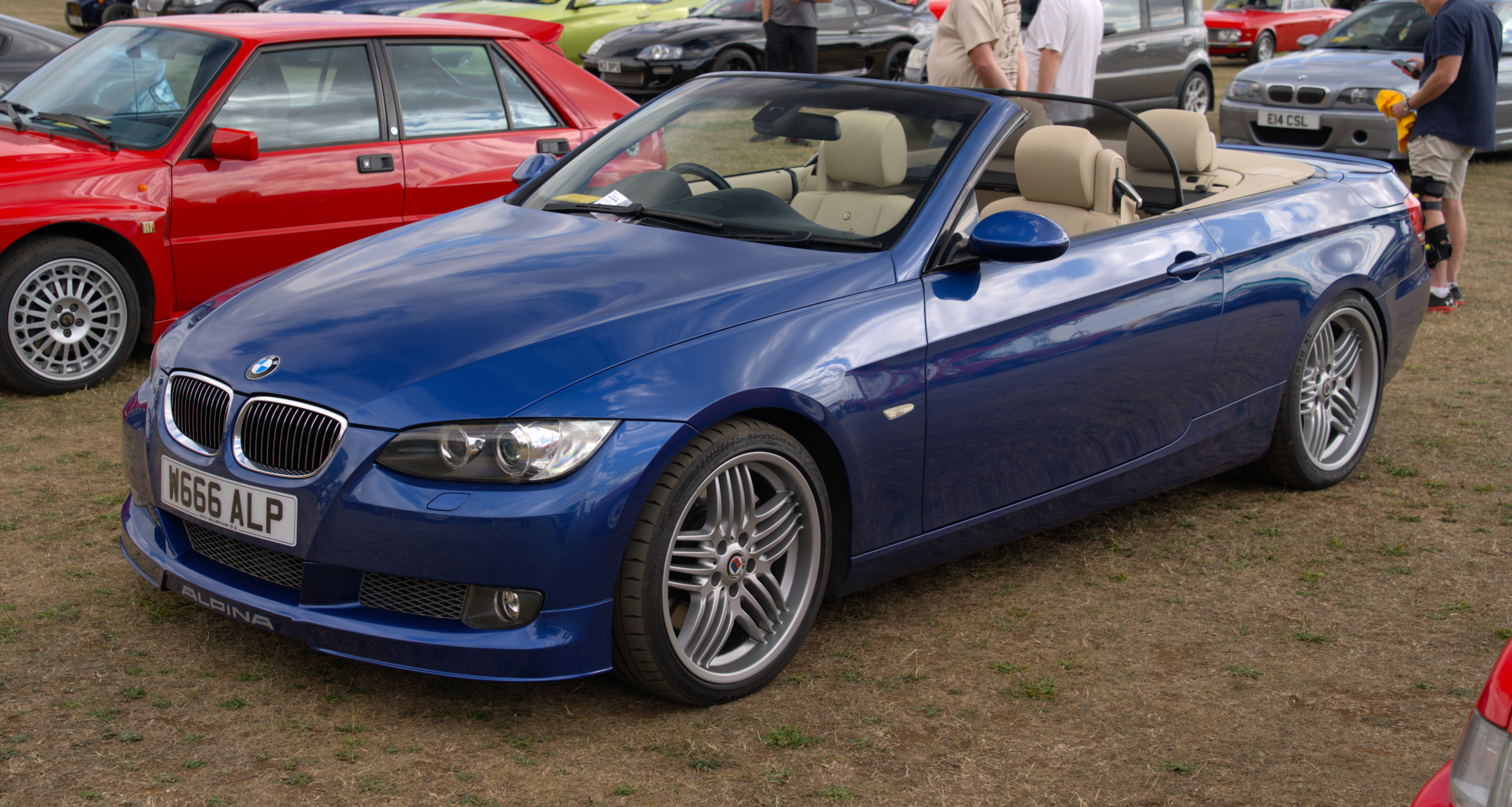
B3 (E93)

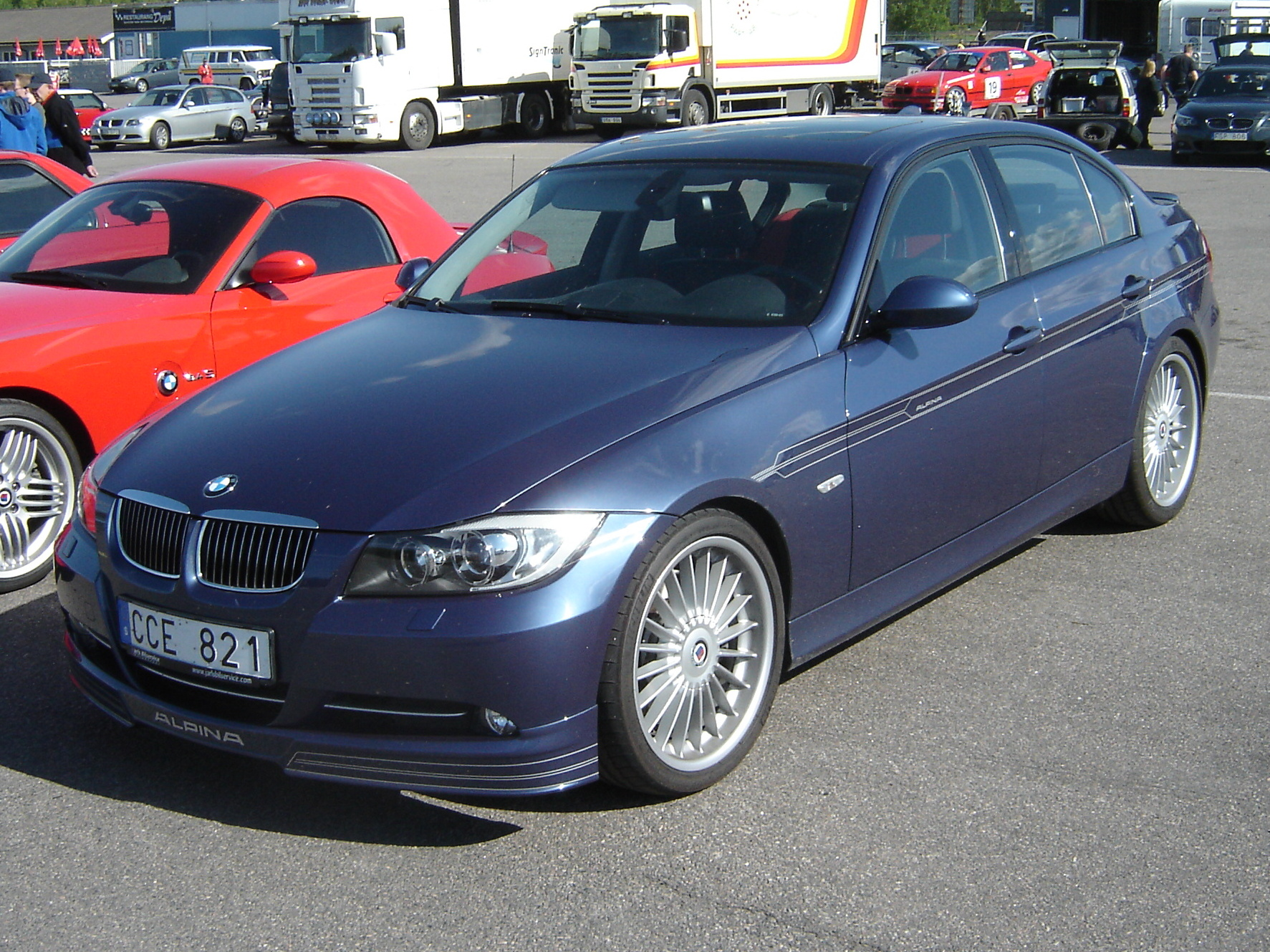
B3 (E90)

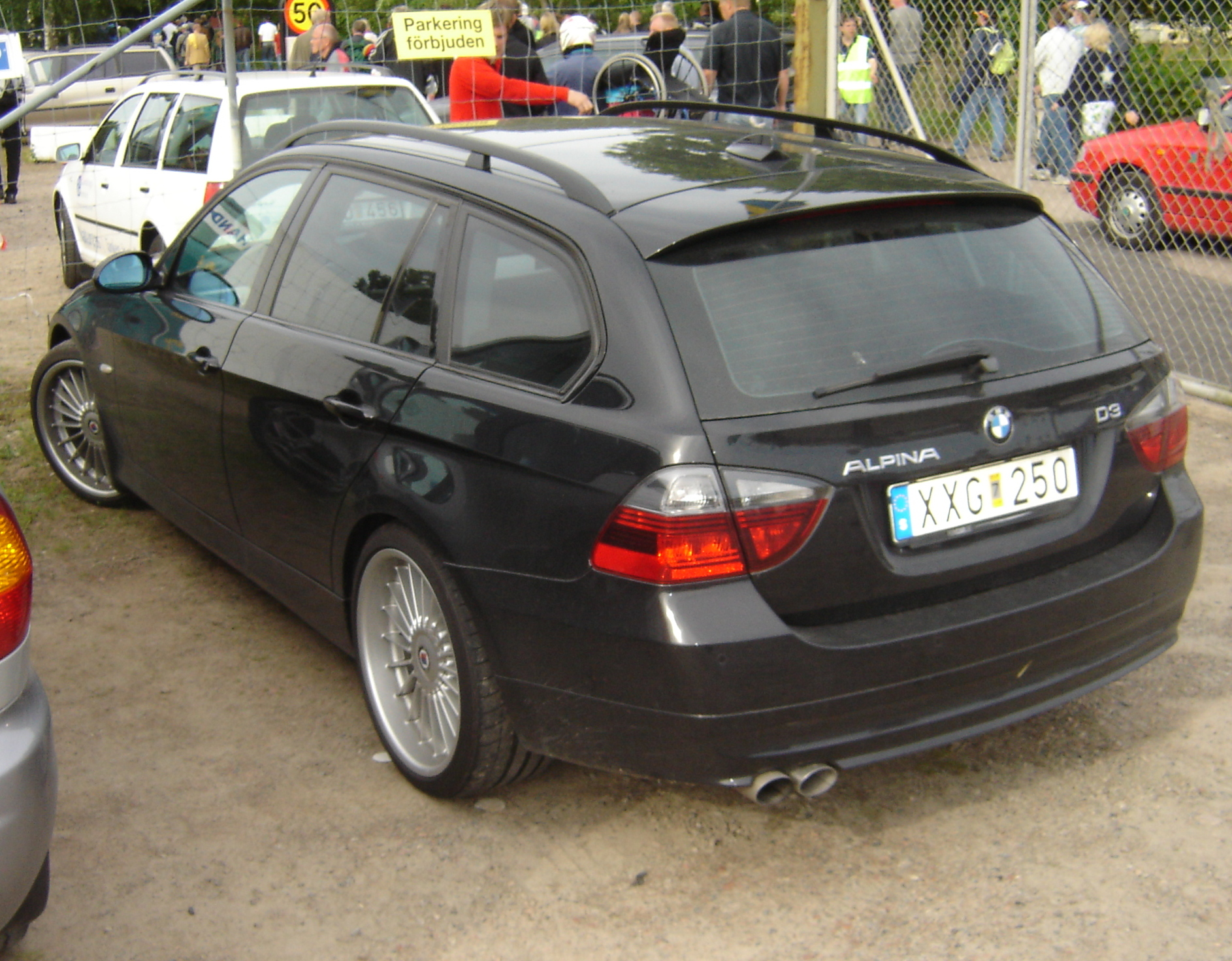
D3 (E91)
