= BMW N54 =

BMW N54 engine
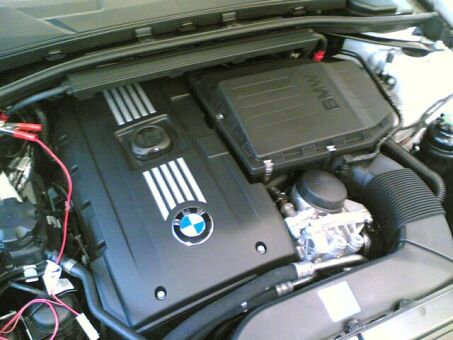

Overview
- Production: 2006–2016

Layout
- Configuration: Straight-6
- Displacement: 3.0 L (2,979 cc)
- Cylinder bore: 84 mm (3.3 in)
- Piston stroke: 89.6 mm (3.5 in)
- Cylinder block material: Aluminium
- Cylinder head material: Aluminium
- Valvetrain: DOHC, with VVT
- Valvetrain drive system: Chain

RPM range
- Max. engine speed: 7,000 rpm

Combustion
- Turbocharger: Twin-turbo
- Fuel type: Petrol

Chronology
- Predecessor: BMW M54 and N52
- Successor: BMW N55

The BMW N54 is a twin-turbocharged straight-six petrol engine that was produced from 2006 to 2016. It is BMW's first mass-produced turbocharged petrol engine and BMW's first turbocharged petrol engine since the limited-production BMW M106 was discontinued in 1986. The N54 debuted at the 2006 Geneva Motor Show and was launched in the 335i model of the E90/E91/E92/E93 3 Series range.

Following the introduction of its BMW N55 successor in 2009, the N54 began to be phased out. The final model powered by the N54 is the E89 Z4 roadster, which was produced until 2016.

The N54 has won six straight International Engine of the Year awards and three straight Ward's 10 Best Engines awards.

There is no BMW M version of the N54, however a high-output version of the N54 is used in the 1 Series M Coupe, Z4 35iS and 335iS models.

== Design ==
The N54 was produced alongside the naturally aspirated BMW N53 engine; both engines have direct injection, double-VANOS (variable valve timing), an open-deck engine block and an electric water pump. The N54 has an aluminium engine block (instead of the magnesium alloy used by the N53), a displacement of 2,979 cc (181.8 cu in) and does not have valvetronic (variable valve lift).

Turbocharging is a key difference between the N54 and BMW's previous straight-six engines. The N54 has two small low-pressure turbochargers to minimise turbo lag. BMW marketed the twin-turbo as "TwinPower Turbo", although the term has since been used for engines which have a single twin-scroll turbocharger. The boost pressure is 8 psi (0.55 bar) and an air-to-air intercooler is used. Compared with the naturally aspirated BMW N52 that it replaced as BMW's highest performance six-cylinder engine, the N54 produces an additional 34 kW (45 bhp) and 108 N⋅m (80 lb⋅ft).

The N54's direct injection system (called "High Precision Injection" by BMW) uses piezo injectors. Its N55 successor uses solenoid-type injectors, because the piezo injectors are more expensive and not reaching their full potential to obtain the "lean burn" benefit.

== Versions ==
Version	Displacement	Power	Torque	Year
N54B30	2,979 cc (181.8 cu in)	225 kW (302 bhp) at 5,800 rpm	400 N⋅m (295 lb⋅ft) at 1,400-5,000 rpm	2006-2010
N54B30	2,979 cc (181.8 cu in)	240 kW (322 bhp) at 5,800 rpm	450 N⋅m (332 lb⋅ft) at 1,500-4,500 rpm	2008-2013
N54B30	2,979 cc (181.8 cu in)	250 kW (335 bhp) at 5,900 rpm	450 N⋅m (332 lb⋅ft) at 1,500-4,500 rpm	2011-2016
Alpina	2,979 cc (181.8 cu in)	265 kW (355 bhp) at 5,500-6,000 rpm	500 N⋅m (369 lb⋅ft) at 3,800-5,000 rpm	2007-2010
Alpina	2,979 cc (181.8 cu in)	294 kW (394 bhp) at 6,000 rpm	540 N⋅m (398 lb⋅ft) at 4,500 rpm	2010-2013
Alpina	2,979 cc (181.8 cu in)	300 kW (402 bhp) at 6,000 rpm	540 N⋅m (398 lb⋅ft) at 4,500 rpm	2012-2013

All versions have a bore of 84.0 mm (3.31 in), a stroke of 89.6 mm (3.53 in), a compression ratio of 10.2:1 and the redline is 7000 rpm.

=== 225 kW version ===
The initial version of the N54 is officially rated at 225 kW (302 bhp) and 400 N·m. However, these figures are considered to be under-rated, and independent testing has resulted in estimates of 232 kW (311 bhp) and 422 N⋅m (311 lb⋅ft).

Applications:

- 2006–2010 E90/E91/E92/E93 335i
- 2007–2010 E60/E61 535i
- 2007–2010 E82/E88 135i
- 2008–2010 E71 X6 xDrive35i
- 2009–2016 E89 Z4 sDrive35i

=== 240 kW version ===
A variant of the N54B30 with higher peak power and torque is used in the 2008-2012 740i and E92 335is.

Applications:

- 2008–2012 F01 740i
- 2011–2013 E92/E93 335is

=== 250 kW version ===
The most powerful version of the N54 is found in the E82 1 Series M Coupe and the E89 Z4 sDrive 35is.

Applications:

- 2011 E82 1 Series M Coupe
- 2011–2016 E89 Z4 sDrive35is

=== Alpina ===
Biturbo engine by Alpina based on the N54B30, with upgrades including the engine control unit, oil cooler and pistons.

==== 265 kW version ====
This is Alpina's initial version of the N54, producing 265 kW (355 bhp).

Applications:

- 2007–2010 Alpina B3 (E90)

==== 294 kW version ====
Applications:

- 2010–2013 Alpina B3 S

==== 300 kW version ====
Applications:

- 2012–2013 Alpina B3 GT3

== Critical reception ==
Car & Driver noted the N54 had minimal turbo lag and "in feel and sound the twin-turbo could pass for naturally aspirated". The N54-engined F01 740i was also praised for its linear power delivery.

Comparing the N54-engined E60 535i with the 550i (using a 4.8–litre naturally aspirated V8), one reviewer noted that the V8 model had more torque but was "only marginally quicker than the 535i" and that the additional weight of the V8 engine was noticeable on twisty mountain roads.

== High-Pressure Fuel Pump failures ==
In the United States, some N54 engines experienced failures of the High Pressure Fuel Pump (HPFP), resulting a class action lawsuit, a voluntary recall and an extended warranty for the HPFP.

Failure of the HPFP can cause the engine to suddenly stop functioning, which has caused several near-misses on highways. BMW was aware of HPFP problems, describing them in internal Technical Service Bulletins as "driveability problems".

In April 2009, a class action suit was filed against BMW in connection with HPFP failures. BMW settled the suit in June 2010. On 26 October 2010, following an ABC News story about HPFP failures, BMW announced a recall of vehicles with the pump in question from manufacturing years 2007–2010. The recall was applied to 130,000 cars, resulting in the replacement of the HPFP in approximately 40,000 of these cars.

In the United States, the warranty period for the HPFP was increased to 10 years and 120,000 mi (190,000 km).

On some cars, the HPFP was replaced multiple times without resolving the issue, potentially leading to the car being refunded under the Lemon Laws in some states.

== Extended warranty in the United States ==
The High Pressure Fuel Pump issue caused BMW North America to extend the warranty for this pump to 10 years or 120,000 mi (190,000 km).

The warranty period for the fuel injectors was also increased, to 10 years or 120,000 mi (190,000 km). An updated design for the fuel injectors was also introduced.

Due to problems with rattling wastegates caused by premature bushing wear, BMW extended the warranty period for wastegate-related issues to 8 years or 82,000 mi (132,000 km).

These warranty extensions only apply to the United States.

== See also ==
- BMW
- List of BMW engines
