= Akrapovič =

Slovenian exhaust system manufacturer

Akrapovič d.d.

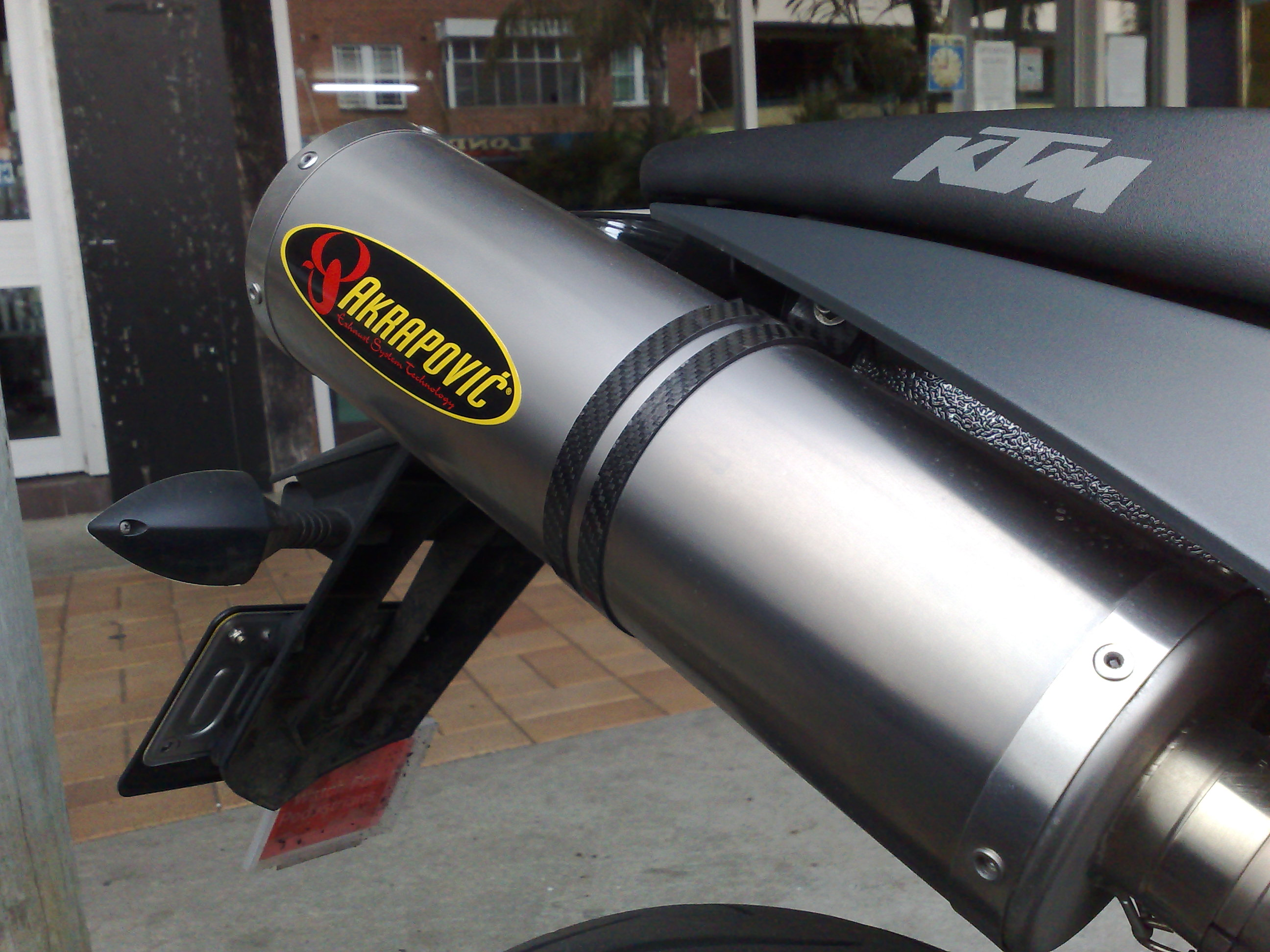
- Type: Private
- Founded: 1990
- Founder: Igor Akrapovič
- Headquarters: Ivančna Gorica, Slovenia
- Key people: Igor Akrapovič
- Products: Car and Motorcycle exhausts
- Revenue: €107 million (2017)
- Operating income: €16 million (2017)
- Number of employees: 1800
- Website: www.akrapovic.com

Akrapovič d.d. (Slovene pronunciation: [aˈkrapɔʋitʃ]) is a Slovenian manufacturer of exhaust systems that began in 1990 in the motorcycle market, and expanded into automobile exhausts in 2010. A global exhaust supplier in motorcycle sport, Akrapovič exhausts are used on motorcycles in Moto GP, superbike, supersport, supermoto, motocross, enduro and rally raid. As of May 2010, Akrapovič systems have been used in a total of 38 world championships, all across motorsport.

== History ==
Igor Akrapovič began motorcycle racing in 1977 in 250 GP two-strokes, then 1000 cc four-strokes in F1 Open Class, and then in Superbike class by the end of his racing in 1988-1989. He founded a motorcycle tuning shop, Skorpion, with a staff of six, where they made their own exhausts because the higher quality Western aftermarket exhausts were too expensive, and those made in the Eastern Bloc were of inadequate quality. Akrapovič says he was motivated by the poor quality of aftermarket exhausts available to the public compared to those used by professional racing teams. He said that the welded pipes on the market had walls that were too thick, and that racing-quality systems were too expensive and difficult for the average customer to obtain. He designed his own exhaust system, which was sufficient to his requirements, based on the experience gained in the field of motorcycle tuning. Steel was replaced with materials such as carbon fibre and titanium.

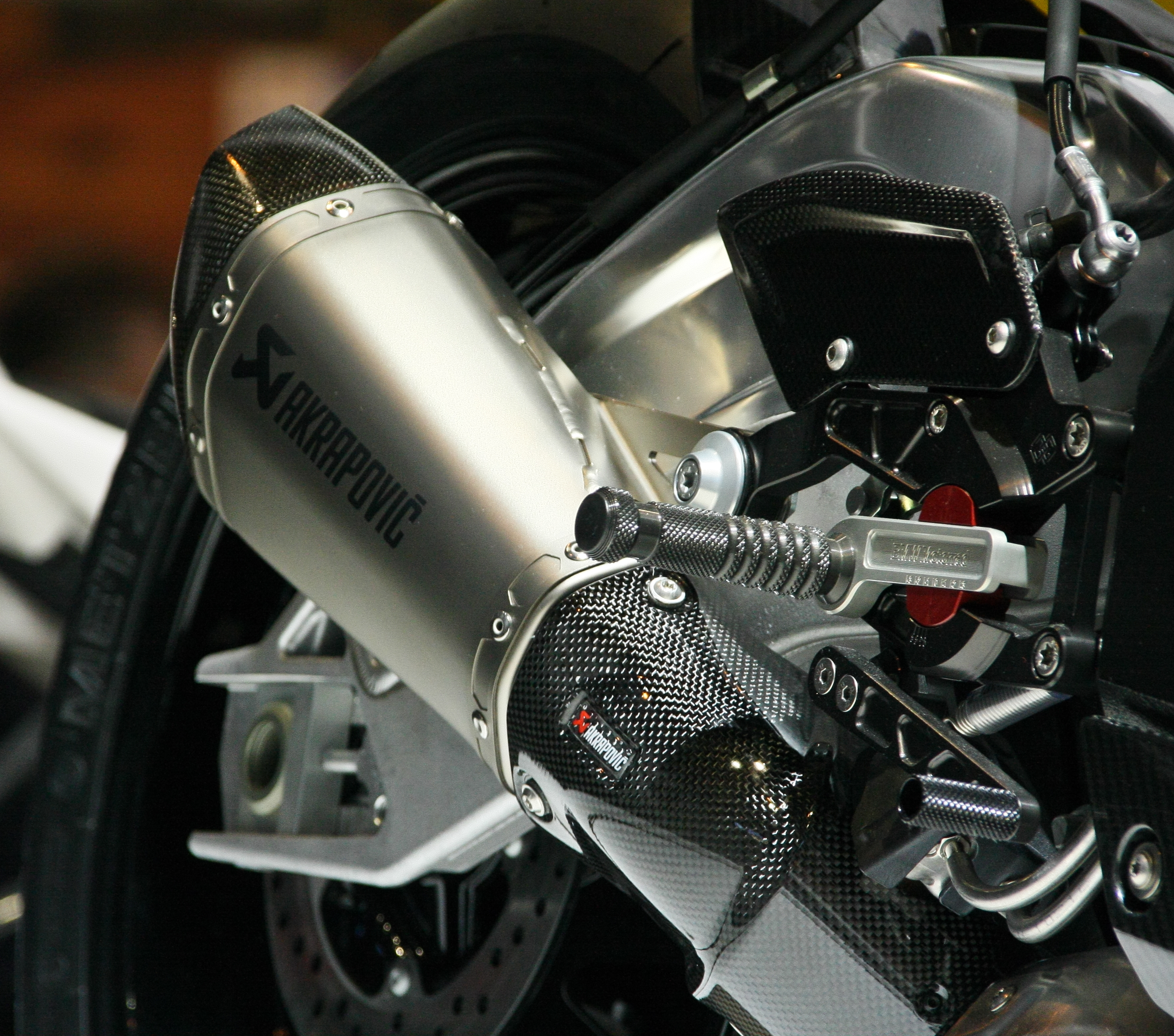
Akrapovič exhaust closeup

In 1993, Kawasaki in Germany tested the exhaust systems and in 1994, Akrapovič exhausts were first used in international competition, in the ESBK and WSBK. Other Pro Superbike championship teams, Yamaha, Suzuki, Ducati and Honda also began using Akrapovič exhausts.

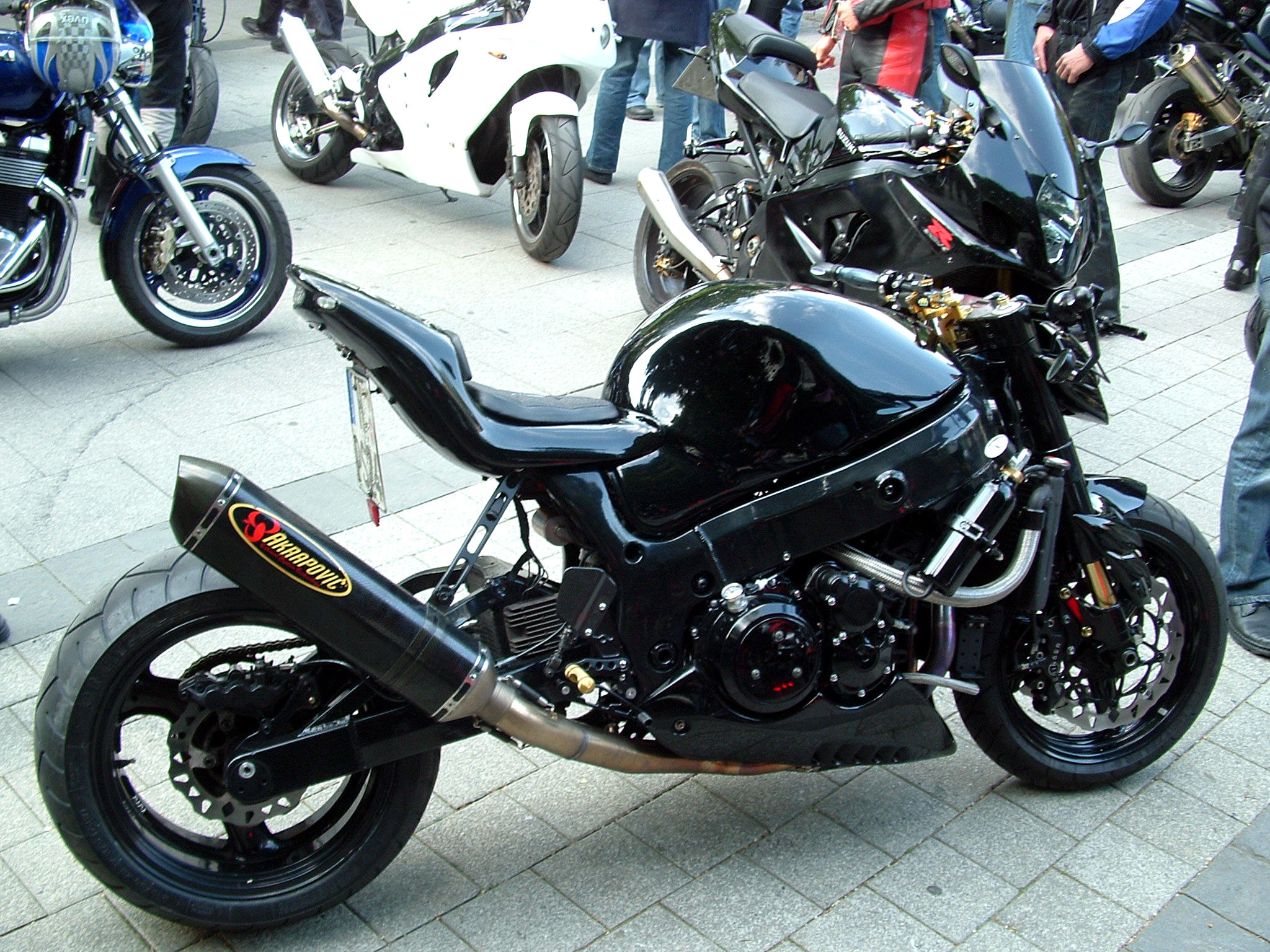
Motorrad Hanover custom bike with Akrapovič exhaust

In 1997, the company changed its name from Skorpion to Akrapovič and that year Akira Yanagawa became the first racer to win a race using an Akrapovič exhaust on a Kawasaki bike. After a strong growth in sales, particularly from Germany, with a growth as high as 70% per annum, production capacity was expanded in 1999, moving location from a 450 m^{2} (4,800 sq ft) workshop to a then 3,000 m^{2} (32,000 sq ft) factory in Ivančna Gorica. This factory has since more than quadrupled in size to 13,000 m^{2} (140,000 sq ft) as of 2010.

In 2000, the first world championship title using an Akrapovič exhaust was won in the WSBK when Colin Edwards won the world championship title on his Castrol Honda SP-01. That year, the 600 SS class with Yamaha and Jörg Teuchert also won using an Akrapovič exhaust. Modifications made to the design saw the company enter into the American AMA Superbike and the Japanese All Japan Superbike Championship and then in 2002, the MotoGP class, forming an alliance with the Honda, Kawasaki and Aprilia factory teams.

As income increased, the company invested in new technology and modernization, upgrading computers in 3-D planning of configurations, programming of tools and computer-aided manufacture. In 2004, the company made its first contact with automobile industry and in 2007 developed and equipped an exhaust system for a Formula 1 race car. In 2007, the company changed its logo. Akrapovič is now active as a supplier in the Porsche Sport Cup, where Porsche cars compete in six fully licensed and unlicensed series. In April 2007, the company was awarded the Best Exhaust Pipe Manufacturer Award from German Motorrad magazine, winning 42% of the votes. The company has since won the Best Brand award in every subsequent year, with 2011 by its highest ever margin of votes.

== Criticism ==
In light of the Russian invasion of Ukraine, Akrapovič faced criticism for continuing operations in both Russia and Ukraine, markets important but not the largest for the company. Despite challenges, it managed to offset revenue losses through increased demand from other regions. The company also expressed concern over supply chain disruptions and the long-term effects of sanctions on Russia, echoing broader industry concerns regarding the conflict's economic impact.

== Partnerships ==
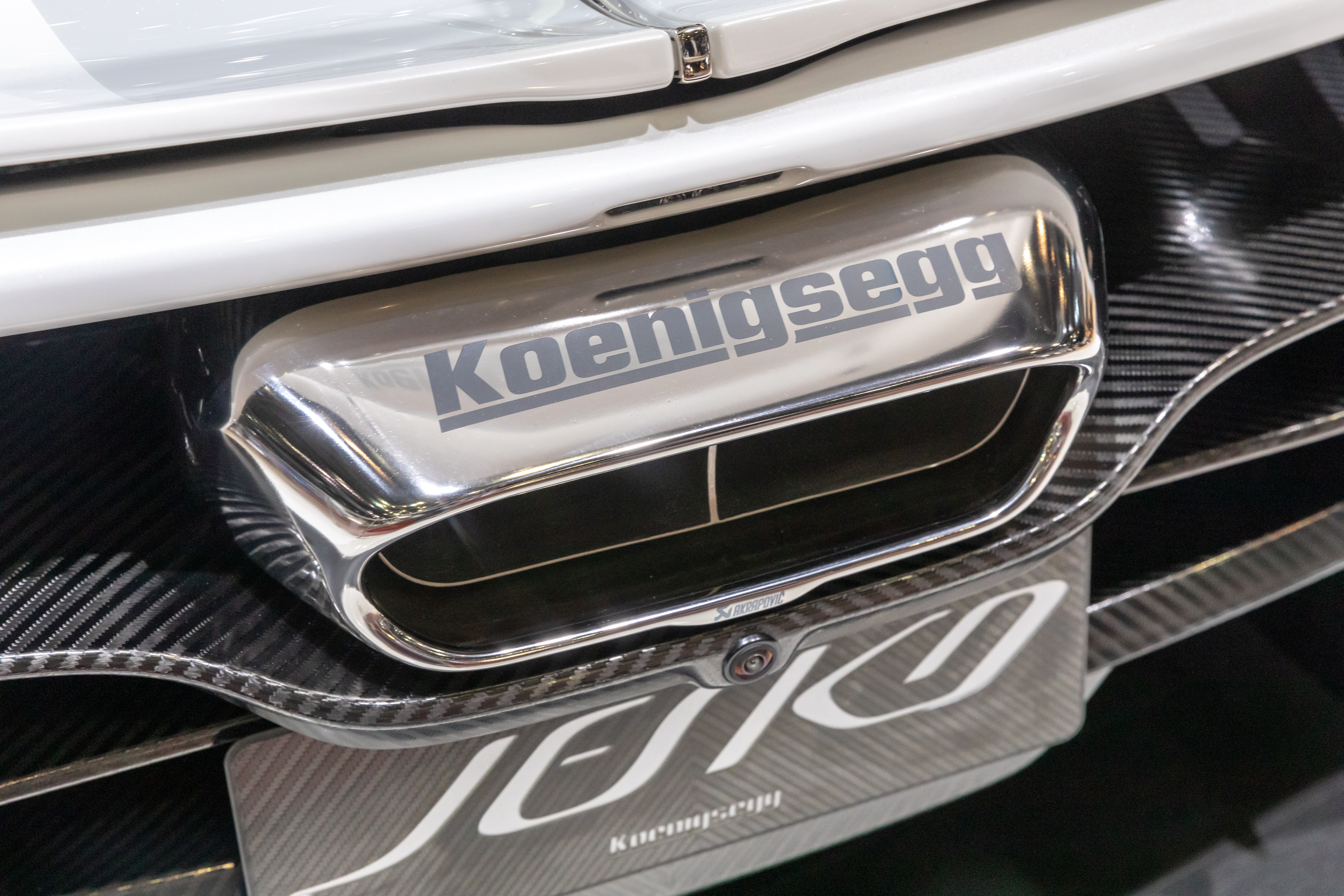
Akrapovič exhaust on a Koenigsegg Jesko

The company partners with motorcycle manufacturers such as Yamaha, who offer Akrapovič cans as optional factory- or dealer-fit equipment on the R1, and MT-01; and BMW Motorrad who offer an Akrapovič can as standard on the R nineT, S1000R, F800R, HP2 Megamoto, and as an option on most other bikes in their range. The exhausts are also on Kawasaki racing bikes, such as the Z1000, as well as Honda, Aprilia and Suzuki. Akrapovič supplies the exhaust systems for Audi's LMP cars since 2009 and is an official Audi Sport partner for the first time in the 2012 season, Audi R18 and Audi A5 DTM. Many of the leading motorcyclists in the Supersport series are known to ride with Akrapovič fitted exhausts including Roger Lee Hayden who has one fitted to his Kawasaki.

Akrapovič has formed a technical partnership with Lamborghini, collaborating on several projects. Together, they've developed exhaust systems for the Lamborghini Urus and Huracán models, as well as a rear arch for the Huracán STO.

== Production ==
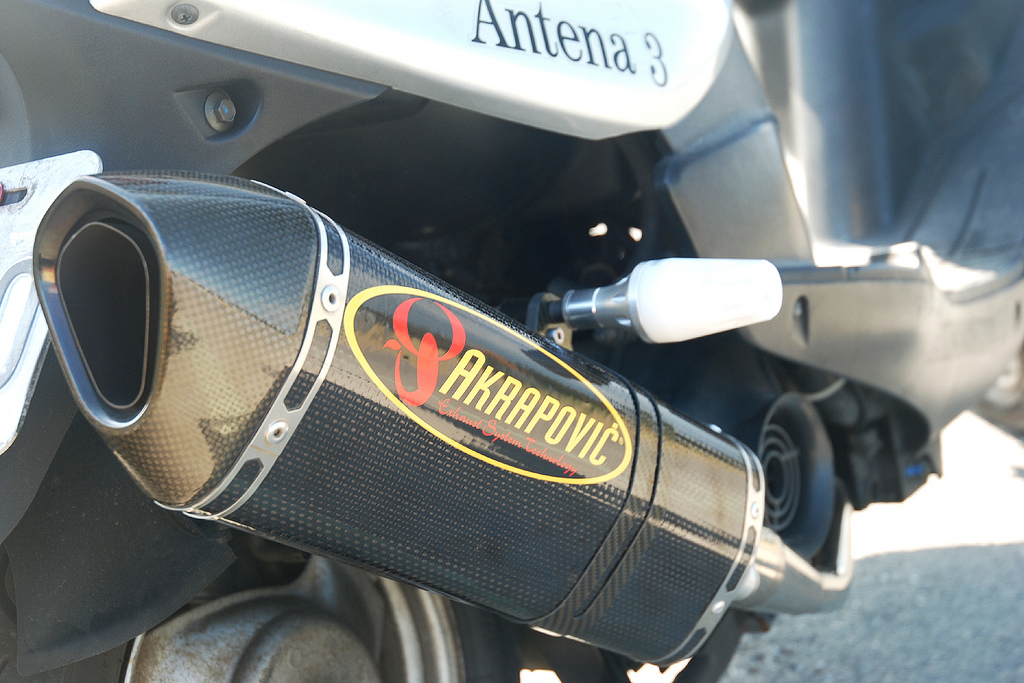
Akrapovič exhaust on a motorscooter

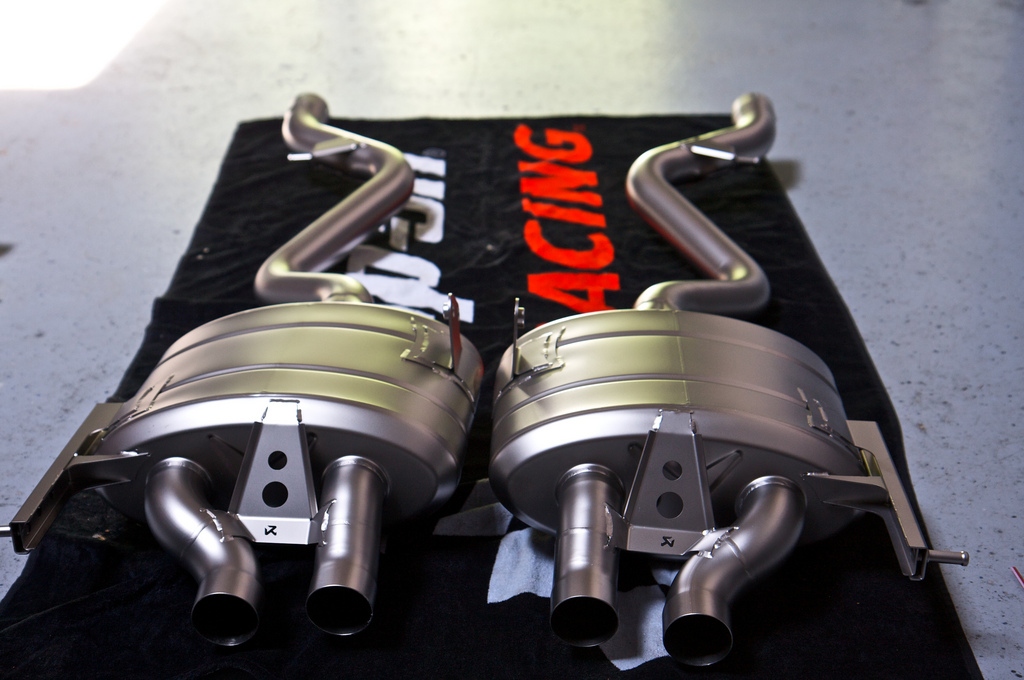
Akrapovič exhaust system for BMW M3

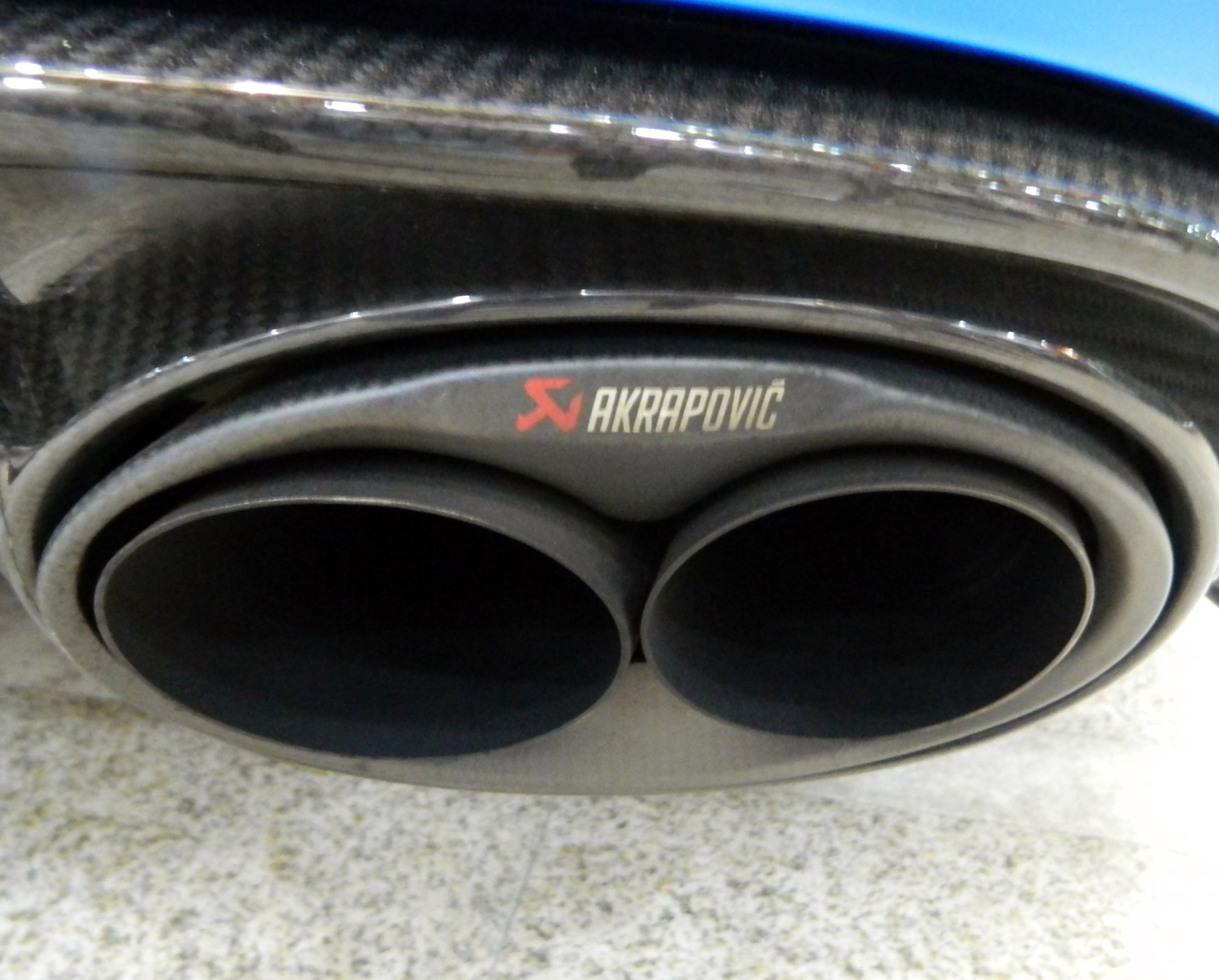
Akrapovič exhaust on an Audi RS 7

Akrapovič's titanium foundry is in an 800 m^{2} (8,600 sq ft) building at the company's main location in Ivančna Gorica. The casting process involves gas injection, X-ray radioscopy, and various chemical analyses, aided by CAD/CAM/CAE tools. The company also manufactures a titanium range called the Akrapovič Evolution.
