= BMW M4 =

High-performance version of the BMW 4 Series

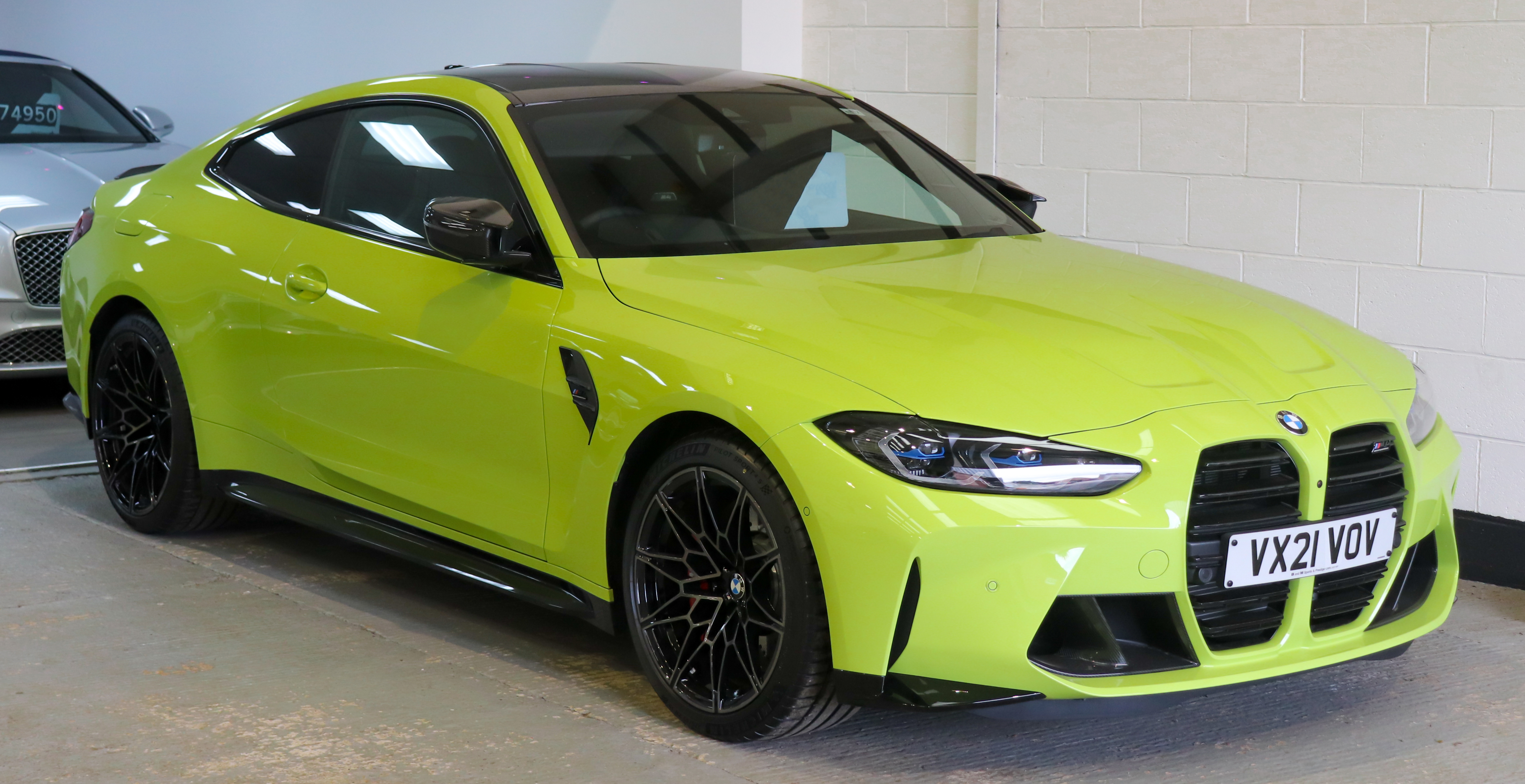
- BMW M4 Competition (G82)

Overview
- Manufacturer: BMW M
- Production: 2014–present
- Assembly: Germany: BMW Dingolfing (M4); BMW Regensburg (BMW plant 6.10) (rework of M4 GT3)

Body and chassis
- Class: Compact executive car (D)
- Layout: Front-engine, rear-wheel-drive; Front-engine, four-wheel-drive (xDrive, 2021–present)

Chronology
- Predecessor: BMW M3 (E92/E93) (coupe and convertible)

The BMW M4 is a high-performance version of the BMW 4 Series automobile developed by BMW's motorsport division, BMW M GmbH, that has been built since 2014.

As part of the renumbering that splits the coupé and convertible variants of the 3 Series into the 4 Series, the M4 replaced those variants of the BMW M3. Upgrades over the standard BMW 4 Series include an upgraded engine, suspension, exhaust system, brakes and weight reduction measures including increased use of carbon fiber, such as on the roof of the car, and the door cards.

The M4 also had a Competition Sport Lightweight (CSL) version that was 100kg lighter than the standard M4.

== First generation (F82/F83; 2014) ==
First generation (F82/F83)
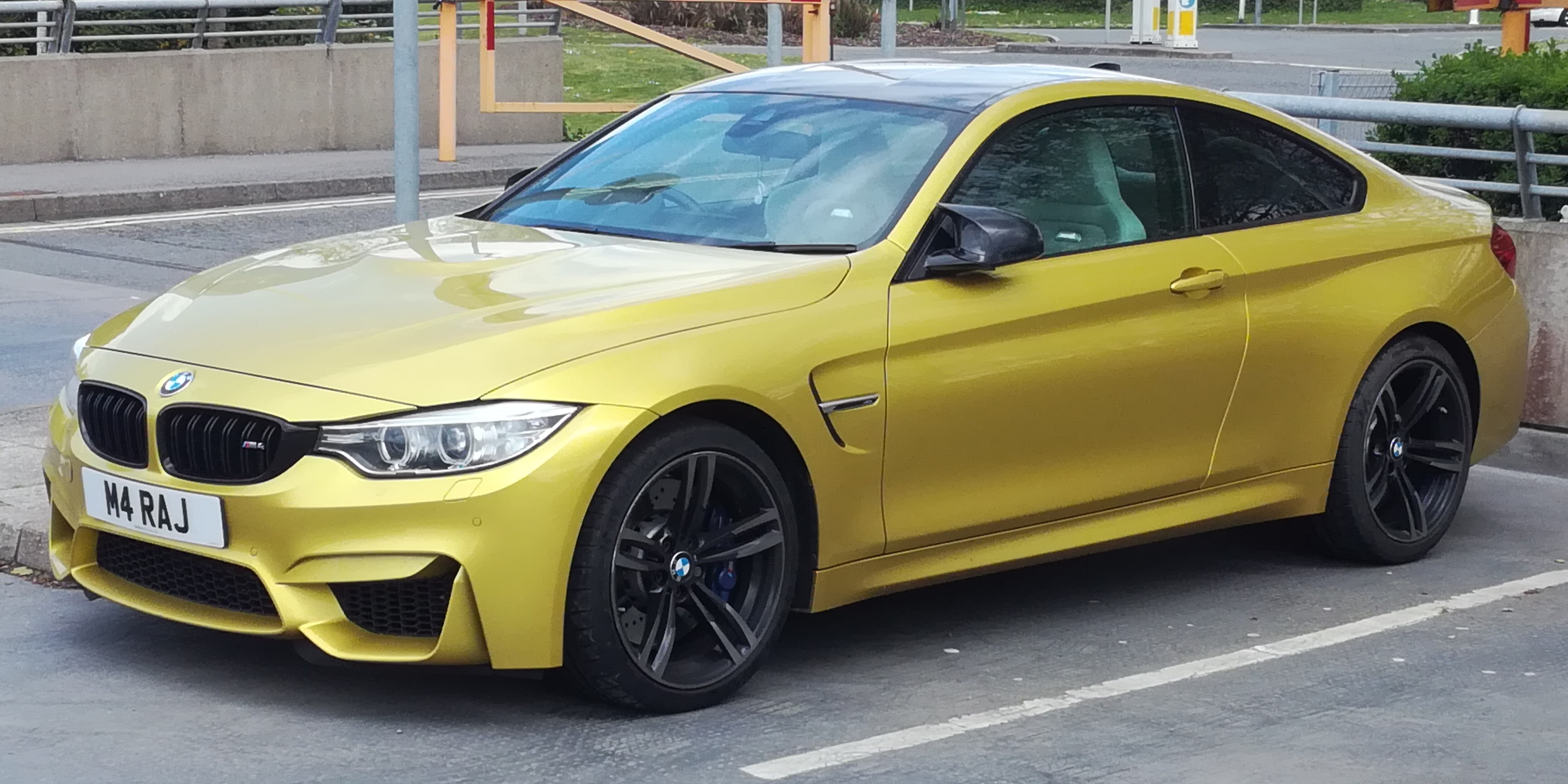

Overview
- Production: 2014–June 2020
- Designer: Florian Nissl

Body and chassis
- Body style: 2-door coupé (F82); 2-door convertible (F83)
- Related: BMW 4 Series (F32/F33); BMW M3 (F80)

Powertrain
- Engine: 3.0 L S55 twin-turbo I6
- Transmission: 6-speed ZF GS6-53BZ manual; 7-speed dual-clutch (M-DCT)

Dimensions
- Wheelbase: 2,812 mm (110.7 in)
- Length: 4,671 mm (183.9 in)
- Width: 1,870 mm (74 in)
- Height: 1,383 mm (54.4 in)

Chronology
- Predecessor: BMW E92/E93 M3 coupe/convertible

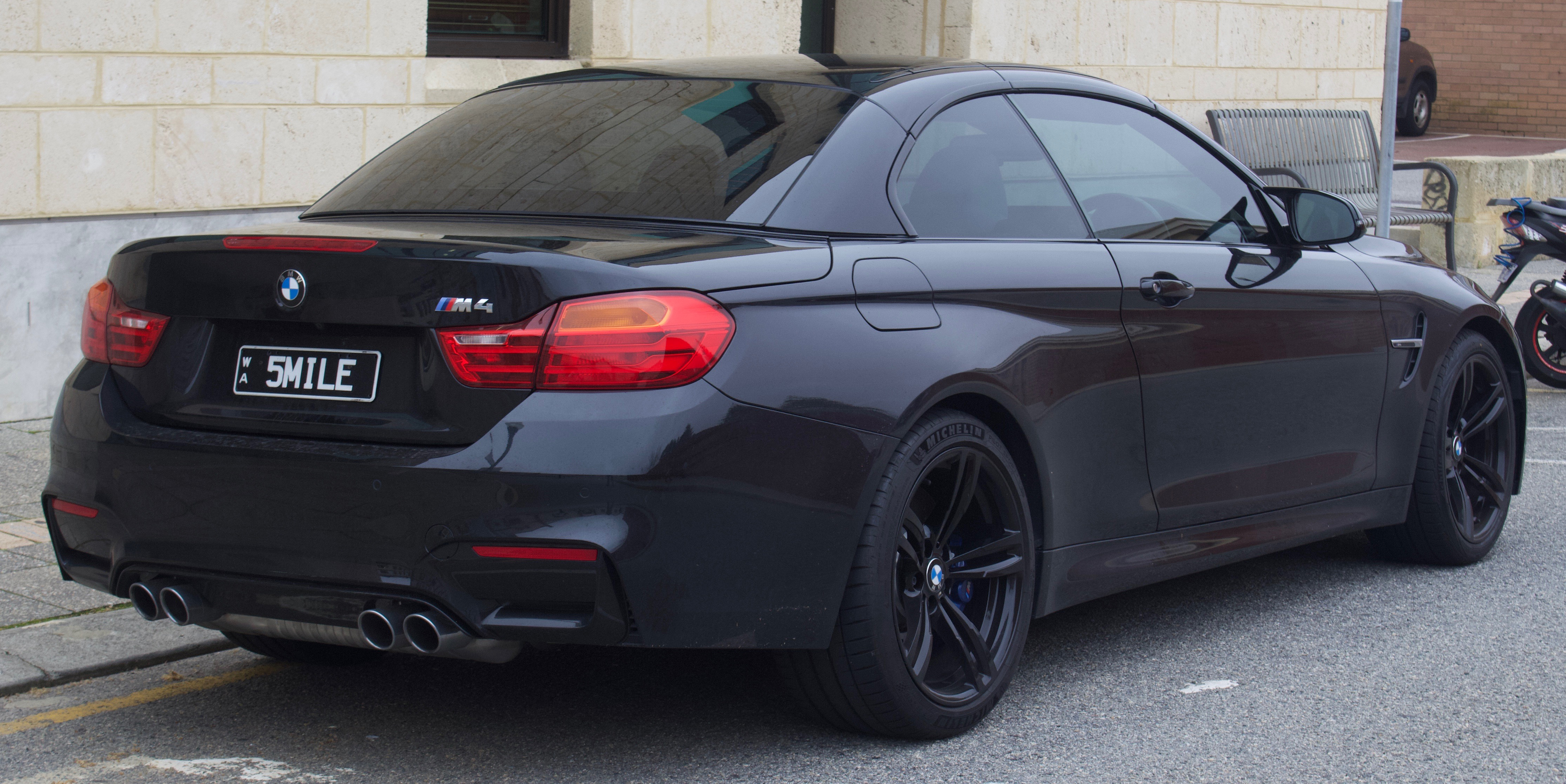
Convertible (F83)

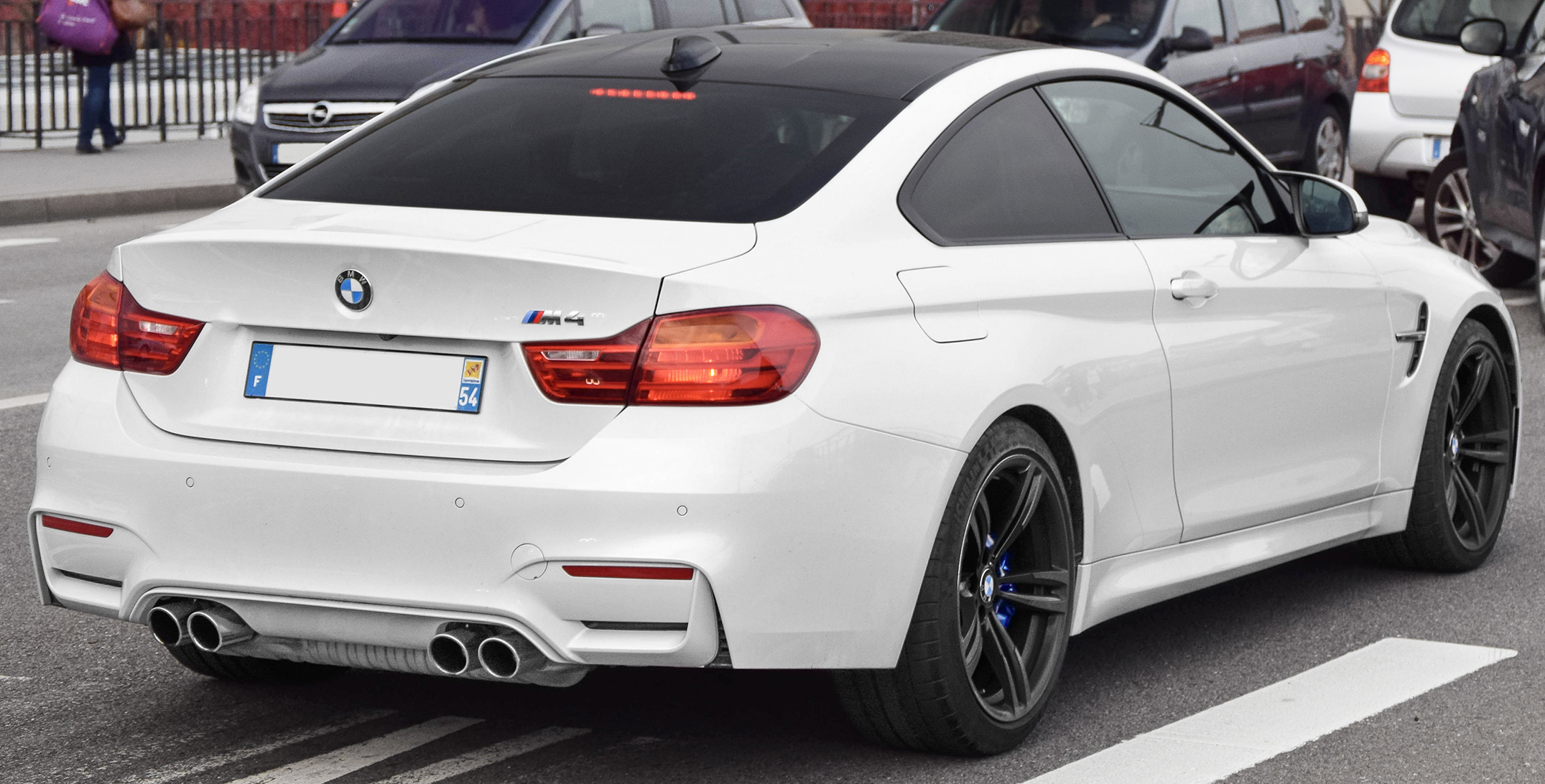
Coupé (F82)

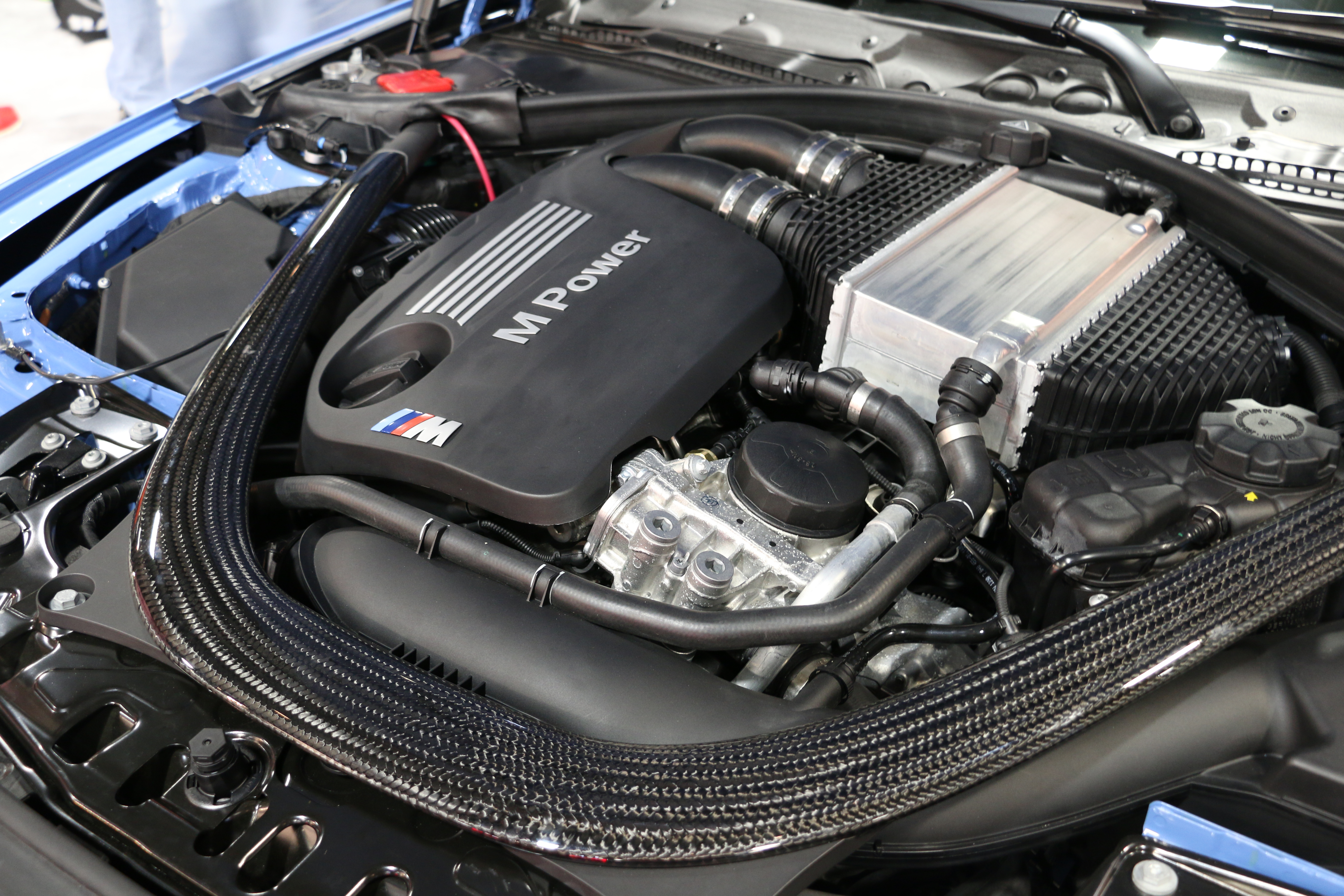
The S55B30T0 Inline-6 engine

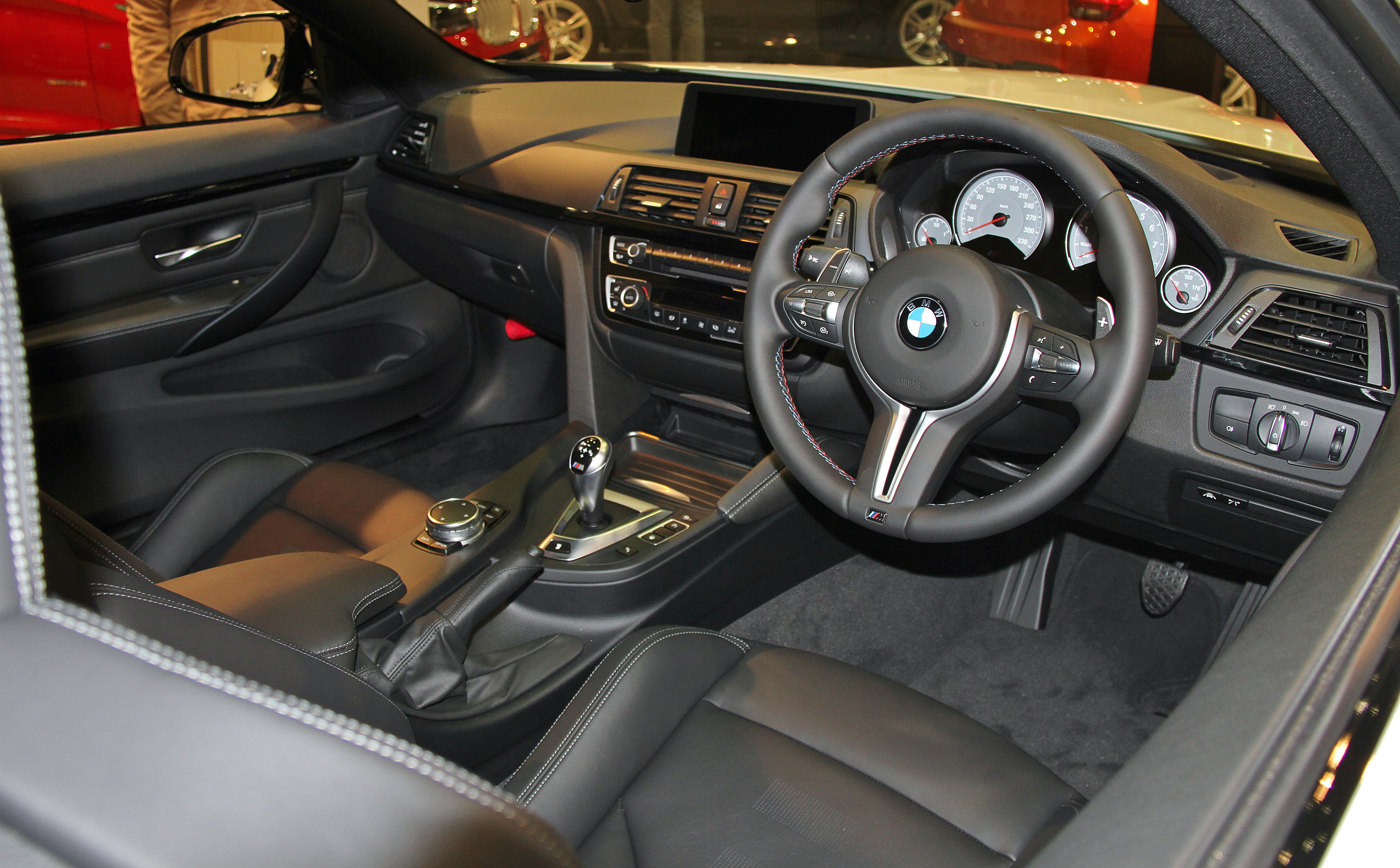
Interior

On 25 September 2013, BMW released the technical specifications of the M4. It is powered by the S55B30 engine, which is developed and engineered by BMW M GmbH. This 3.0-litre inline-6 engine has been built specifically for the new M4/M3, with a maximum engine speed of 7,600 rpm. The engine uses two mono-scroll turbochargers with a peak boost pressure of 18.1 psi (1.2 bar). The power is rated at 317 kW (431 PS; 425 hp), however this is achieved not at a specific engine speed, but is instead rated throughout the range of 5,500–7,300 rpm. The engine's torque is rated at 550 N⋅m (406 lbf⋅ft) throughout the range of 1,850–5,500. Two transmission choices are available, the 6-speed manual and the 7-speed M-DCT transmissions. The 7-speed M-DCT transmission accelerates the car from 0 to 100 km/h (62 mph) in 4.1 seconds) and the 6-speed manual transmission from 0 to 100 km/h (62 mph) in 4.3 seconds. The weight of the European specification M4 equipped with a manual transmission is 1,572 kg (3,466 lb) and with the M-DCT dual-clutch transmission, the car is some 40 kg (88 lb) heavier, losing some 80 kg (176 lb) as compared to the E92 M3.

As per its E92 predecessor, the roof of the coupe model is constructed from carbon fiber (except if the optional sunroof is fitted). Carbon fiber is also used for the boot lid and engine brace. For the first time in a M3/M4 model, an electric power steering unit is used. The steering system is specifically tuned for both the M3 and M4, however it has been criticized for lacking in feel. The 18 inches (460 mm) and 19 inches (480 mm) wheel options are available with lightweight forged alloy wheels being standard. The M compound brakes come standard (with blue brake calipers), while carbon ceramic brakes (with gold brake calipers) are available as an option.

The M4 features Active Sound, live amplification of the engine's natural sound inducted into the passenger cabin via speakers in the car. BMW claims this technology has been used so that the well insulated cabin can reduce road/wind noise but still provide the driver with the sporty sound of the M powered engine. There are no artificial sound or any pre-recorded track in the system. This system was first implemented in the M5 (F10).

The M4 is based on the F32 4 Series however 50 percent of its components are unique as compared to the 4 Series.

The convertible variant of the M4 was announced along with its coupe sibling, also internally known as F82 or F83 M4. It shares almost everything with the coupé version, but weighs more due to its folding metal roof. The convertible weighs 1,750 kg (3,858 lb) (manual), 1,691 kg (3,728 lb) (M-DCT). The three-piece retractable hardtop folds in 20 seconds. The only significant difference between the two is the weight due to its retractable hardtop. Like its hardtop counterpart, the F83 M4 uses carbon fiber reinforced plastic to lighten and stiffen the car.

Because of its extra weight it accelerates slower, taking it 0.3 seconds longer to 100 km/h (62 mph); 4.9 seconds with the manual and 4.4 seconds with the M-DCT transmission. The dynamic differences between the two variants are marginally small.

Starting from the 2019 model year (production from 07/2018 onward) BMW removed the carbon fiber driveshaft so as to be able to fit an Otto Particulate Filter (OPF), necessary to comply with WLTP emissions regulations and this also meant that the M Performance Exhaust was no longer able to be offered on these cars by BMW.

=== Variants ===
==== M4 Competition Package ====
In February 2017, BMW announced the M4 Competition Package. The M4 Competition Package increases power output by 14 kW (19 PS; 19 hp) to 331 kW (450 PS; 444 hp) and has a revised suspension for better handling. New springs, dampers and anti-roll bars complement the included Adaptive M Suspension. BMW also re-tuned the electronic differential and the Dynamic Stability Control to match the upgraded hardware. The interior remains largely unchanged, but Competition Package cars get new lightweight sport seats along with the M-striped woven seat belts. The exterior includes the M Sport exhaust with black chrome tailpipes and high gloss Shadow Line exterior trim. Gloss black trim is added to the kidney grille, side gills, and model badge on the trunk.

With the Competition Package, the coupe version accelerates from standstill to 100 km/h (62 mph) in 4.0 seconds.

There is a convertible version, and that does the run in 4.2 seconds, both coupé and convertible forms using the dual-clutch transmission.

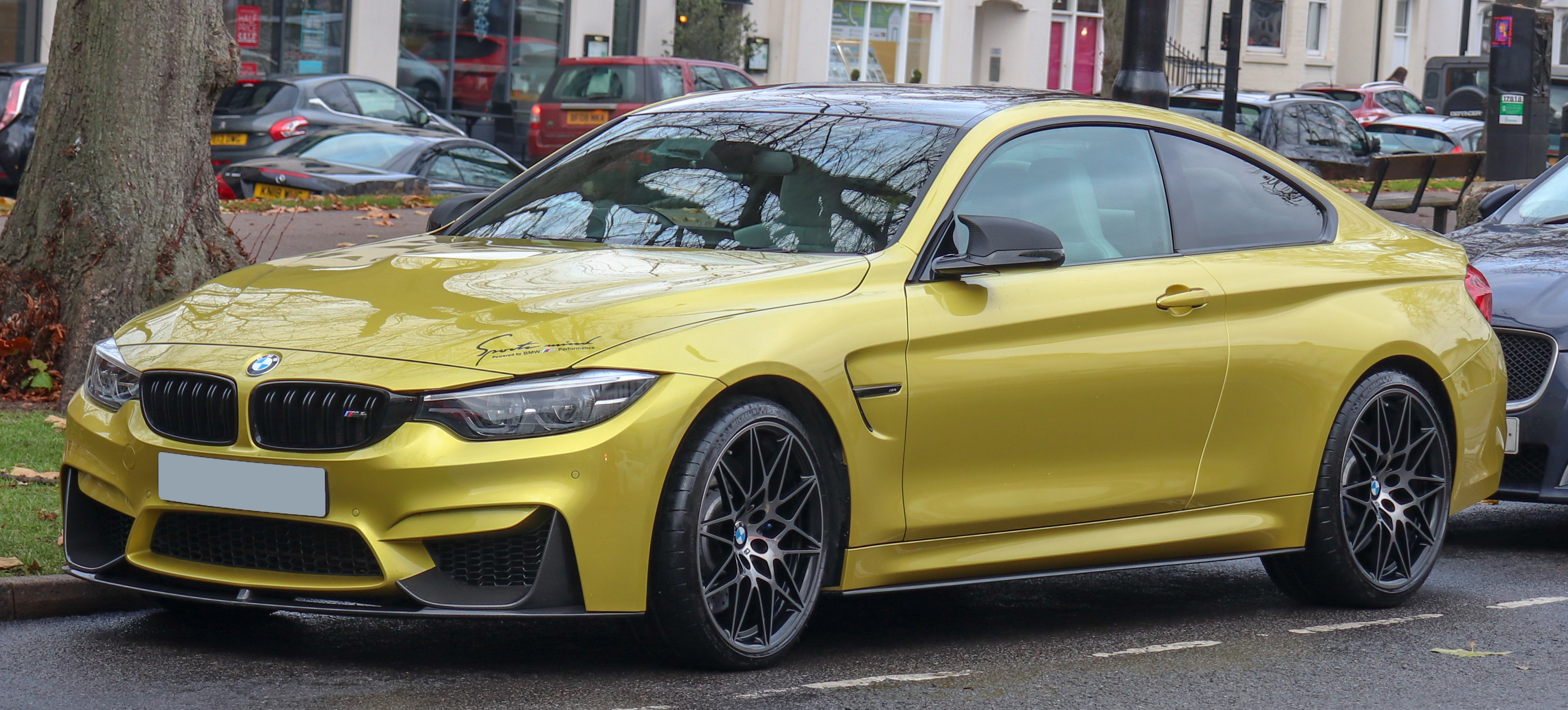
BMW M4 Competition Package (F82)

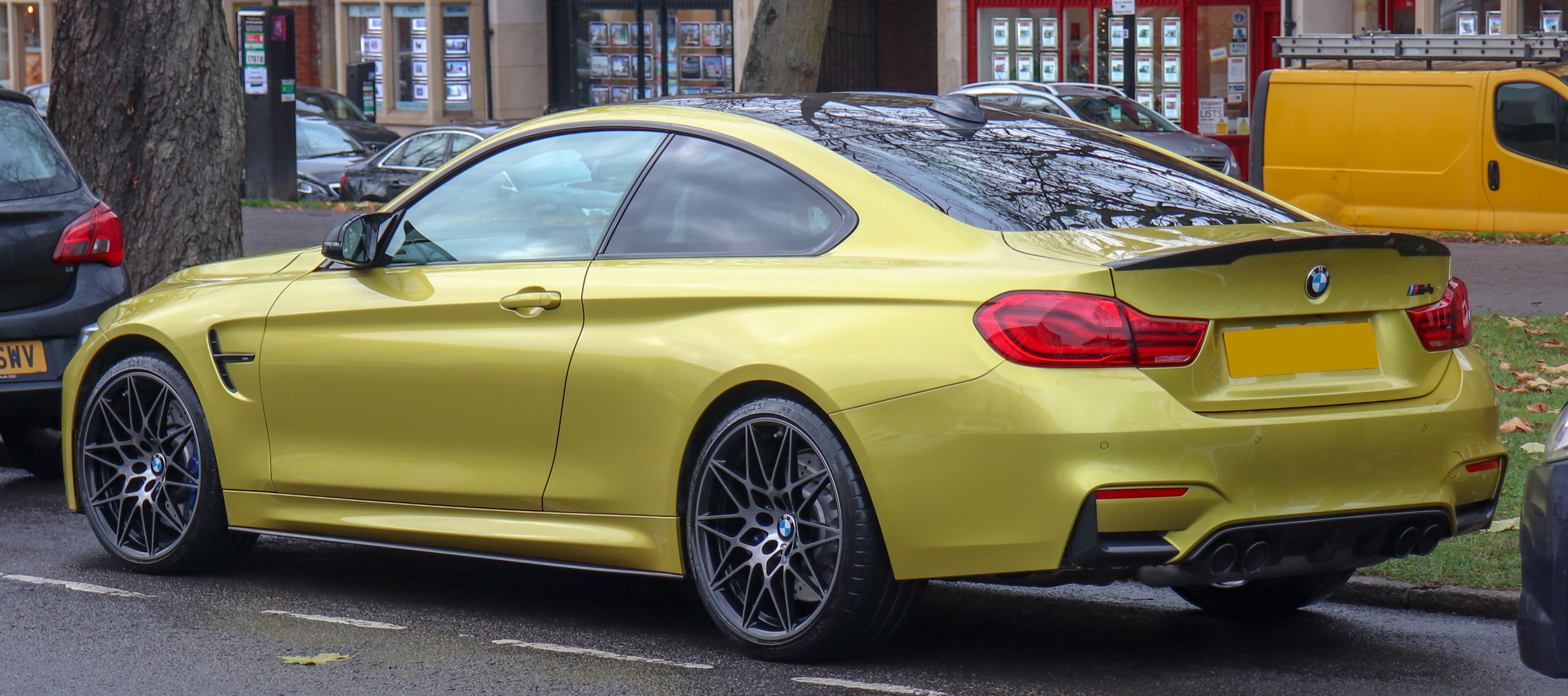
BMW M4 Competition Package (F82)

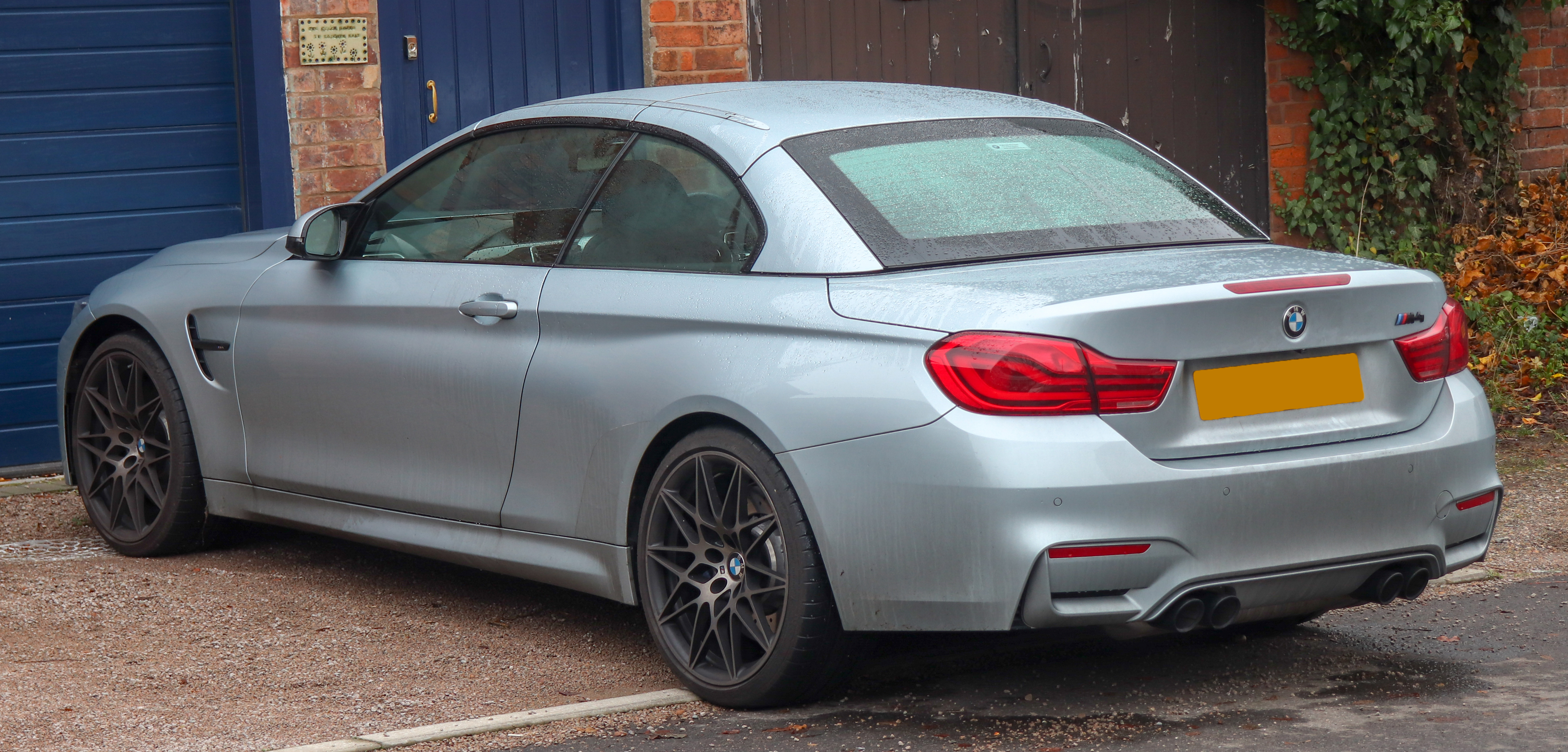
BMW M4 Competition Package (F83)

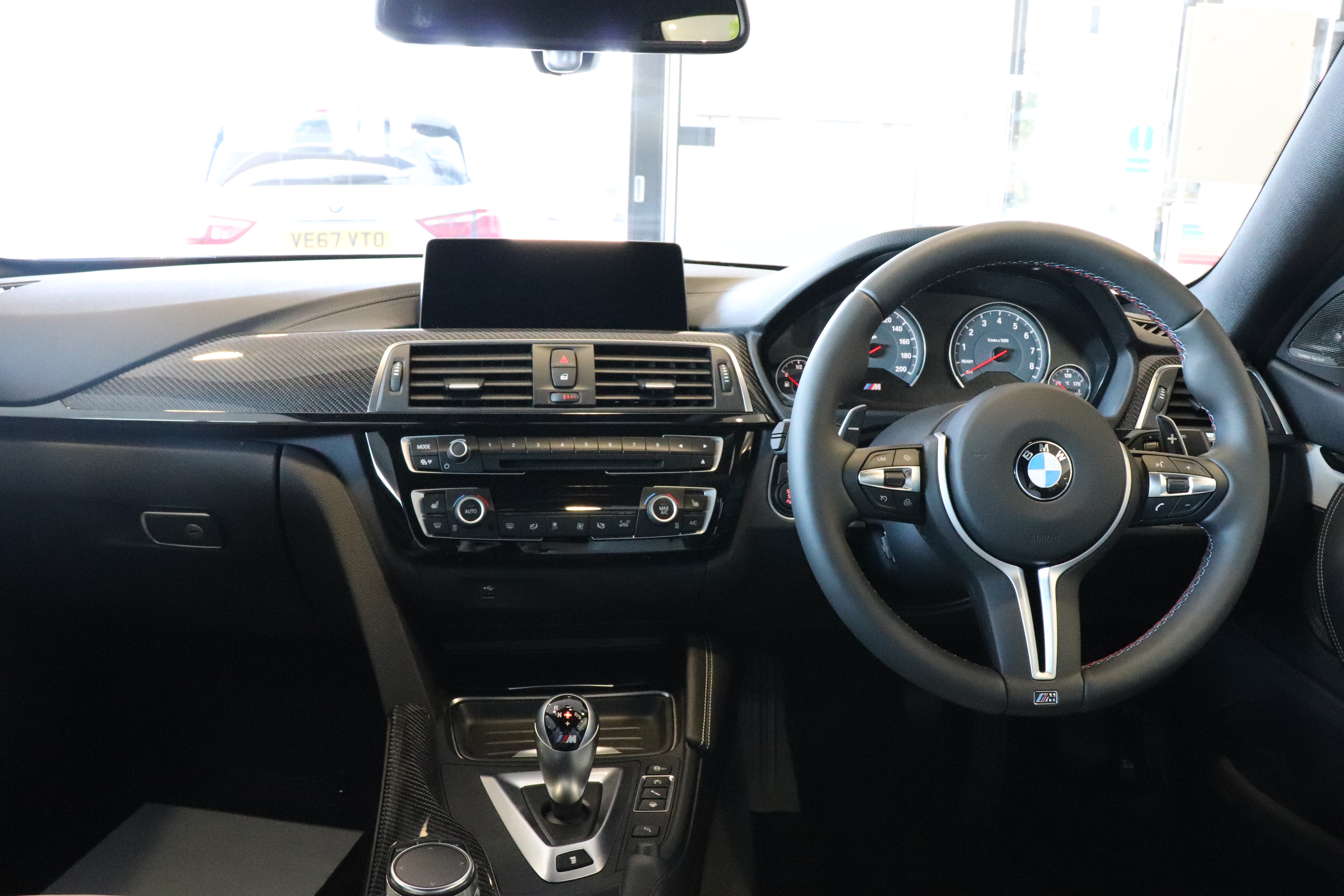
Interior

==== M4 GTS ====
BMW introduced the M4 GTS concept in August 2015 at the Pebble Beach Concours d'Elegance. In 2016, BMW introduced the production version of the car which was a track-focused version of the standard M4 coupé itself with a limited production run of 700 units.

The M4 GTS is powered by the same 2,979 cc (3.0 L; 181.8 cu in) twin-turbocharged straight-six engine as in the standard M4, but the power output has been raised by 51 kW (69 PS; 68 hp) to 368 kW (500 PS; 493 hp) at 6,250 rpm and 600 N⋅m (443 lb⋅ft) of torque at 5,500 rpm, largely due to a nozzle water injection system that is the first to be used on a production automobile in almost twenty years. In addition to the increased engine power, the M4 GTS is 27 kg (60 lb) lighter than the standard M4 Coupé with the DCT transmission, so the weight now stands at 1,585 kg (3,494 lb). The M4 GTS features new OLED taillights (a BMW first), a stripped and weight-reduced interior with a full roll cage (half roll cage for North American markets), fiberglass cabin to trunk divider, removed soundproofing material, titanium exhaust system, a manually-adjusted three-way suspension by KW suspensions, and multi-way adjustable carbon fiber splitter and wing that can add up to 63 pounds front and 210 pounds rear of downforce at 300 km/h (186 mph).

The 0 to 100 km/h (62 mph) acceleration time is reduced to 3.8 seconds, while the top speed stands at 305 km/h (190 mph). The M4 GTS has, according to BMW, lapped the infamous Nürburgring Nordschleife track in 7 minutes and 28 seconds – 24 seconds faster than the base M4 and 20 seconds faster than the M3 GTS.

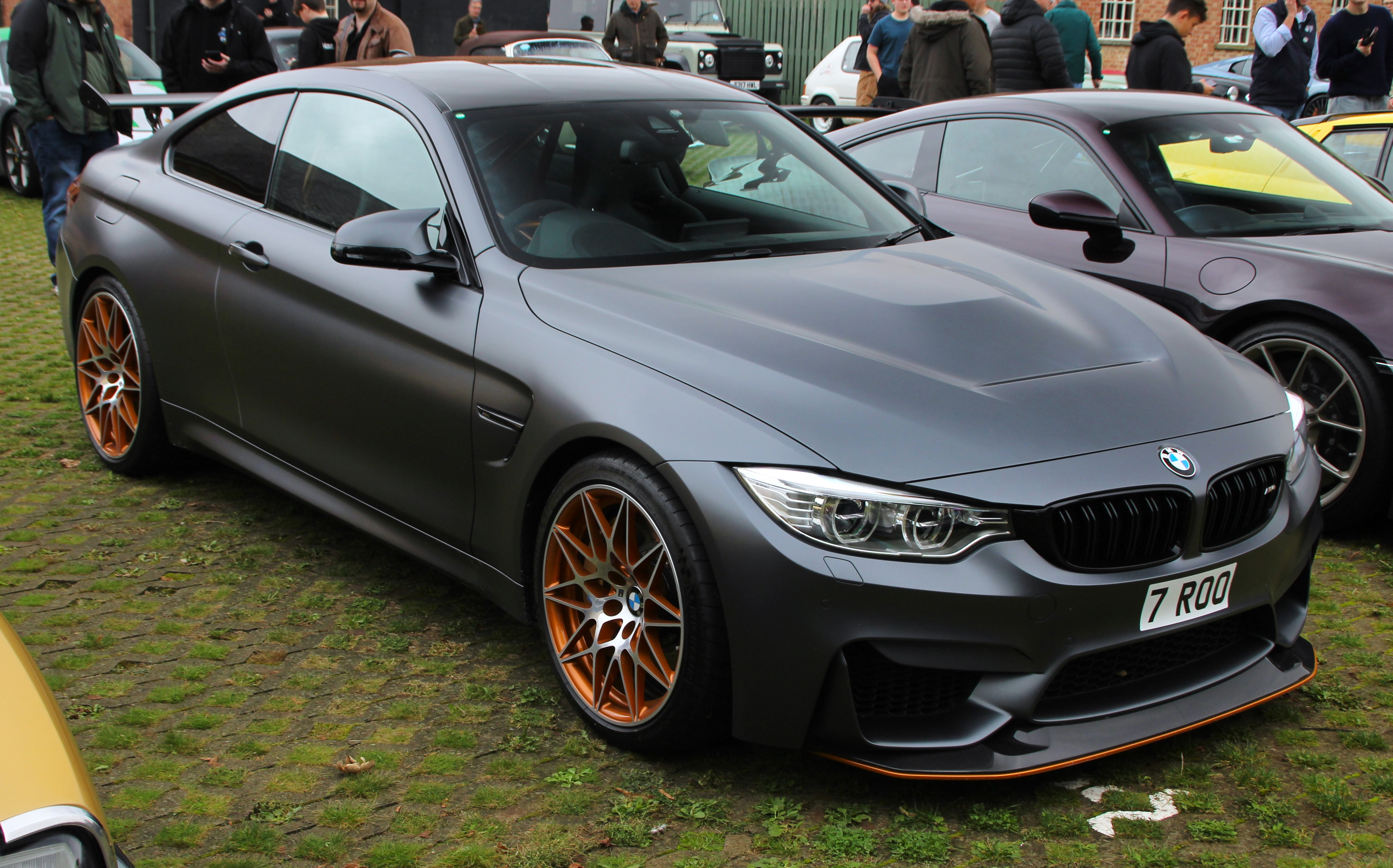
BMW M4 GTS

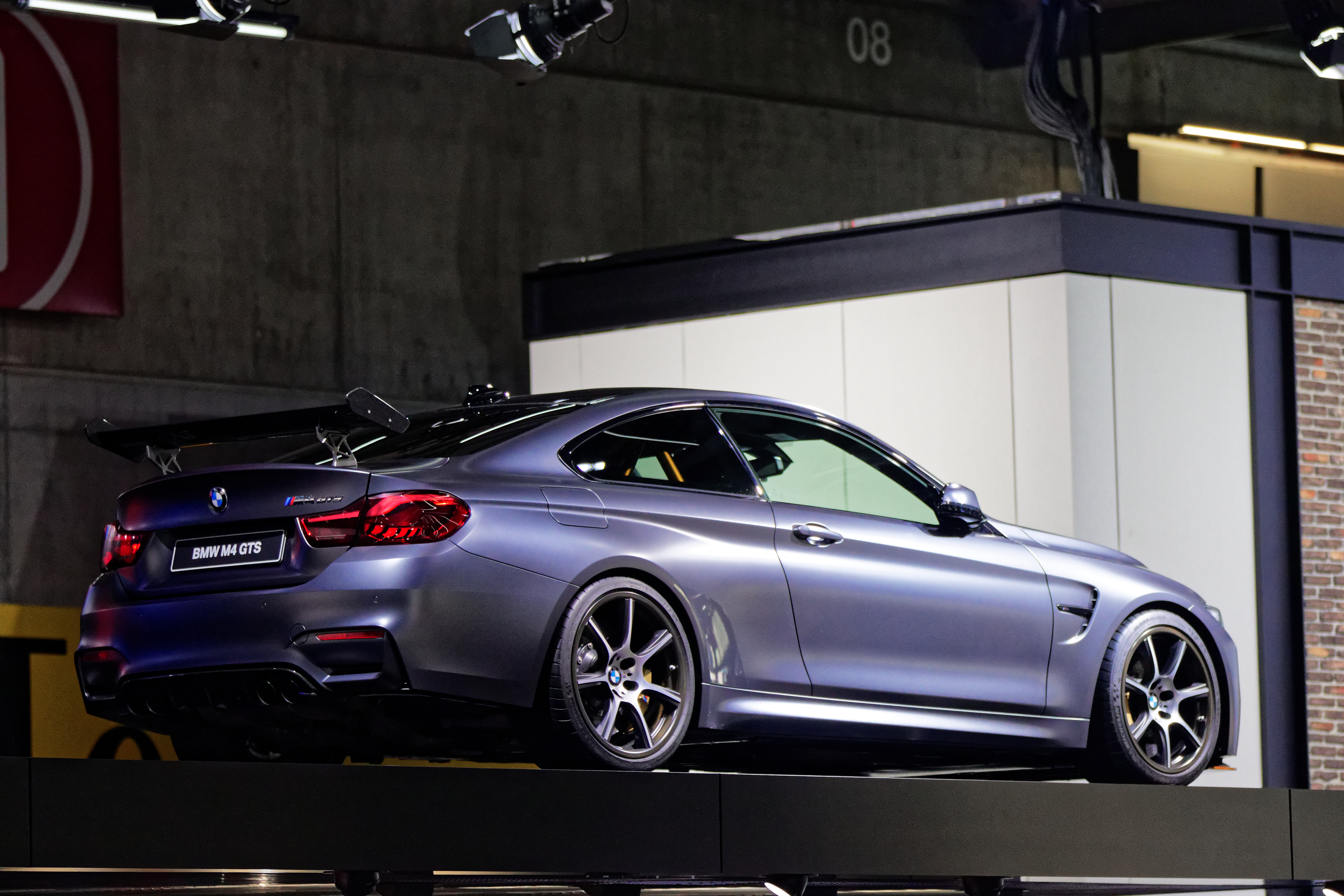
BMW M4 GTS

==== M4 DTM Champion Edition ====
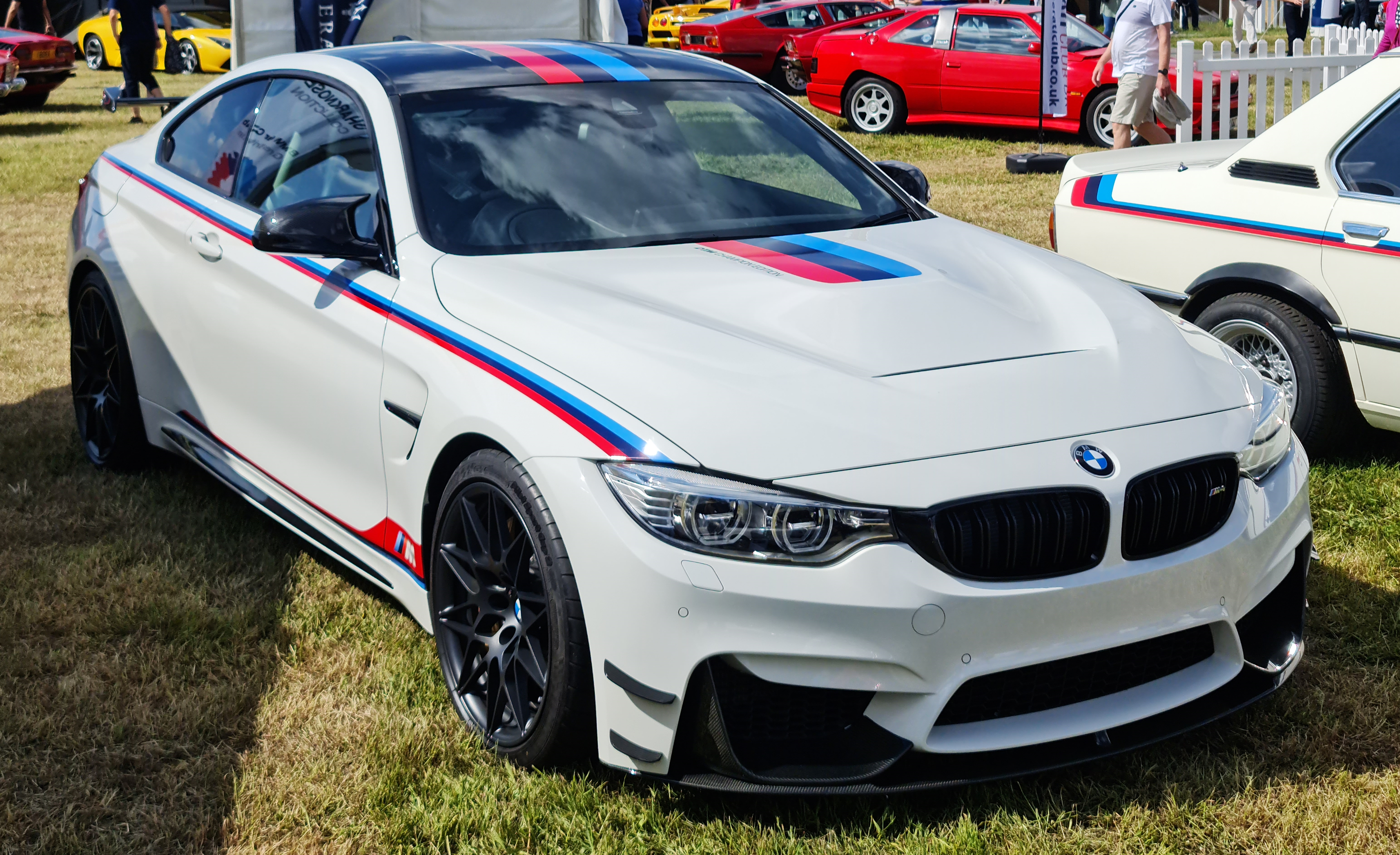
M4 DTM Champion Edition

The BMW M4 DTM Champion Edition was first launched in 2014, following the victory of Marco Wittmann in the 2014 DTM season, in commemoration of the winning BMW M4 DTM racecar. The model is based on Wittmann's 2014 M4 DTM in color. The 2014 DTM Champion Edition is limited to 23 units, Wittmann's race number.

After winning the 2016 season, BMW once again released a DTM Champion Edition of the M4. The M4 DTM Champion Edition uses the engine from the M4 GTS with 368 kW (500 PS; 493 hp) 600 N⋅m (443 lb⋅ft) and water injection. All performance data are identical to those of the GTS. It is limited to 200 units and is only available in white in keeping with the DTM car. The visual difference to the GTS lies in the smaller spoiler, less aggressive front splitter, the addition of canards on the front bumper as well as the omission of the orange design elements.

==== M4 CS ====
In early 2017, BMW announced M4 CS in limited run of 3,000 units globally with 1,000 units being delivered to the United States. The M4 CS sits between the M4 Competition Package and the M4 GTS. The M4 CS utilizes the same engine as the standard M4 but gets a 9 hp boost from the M4 Competition Package, and generates 338 kW (460 PS; 453 hp) and 600 N⋅m (443 lb⋅ft) of torque. The M4 CS gets a total boost of 28 hp from its first generation (2014). The car features a lightweight interior which trims 35 lb (16 kg) off the weight of the M4 Competition. This is done in part through the use of "compacted natural fiber" interior door panels with fabric latch pulls as seen in the M4 GTS, light weight M sport seats, and the removal of the central arm rest.

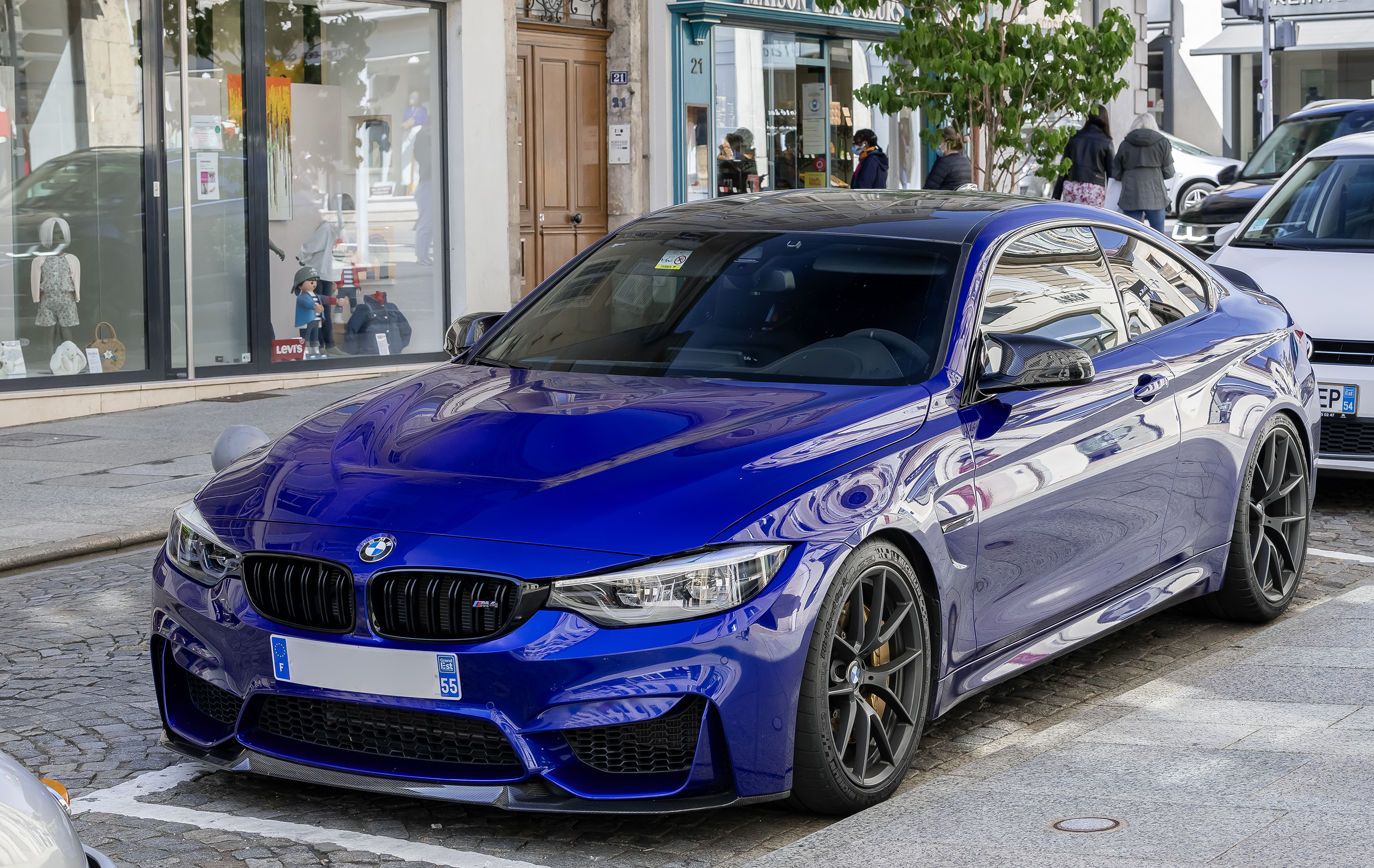
BMW M4 CS

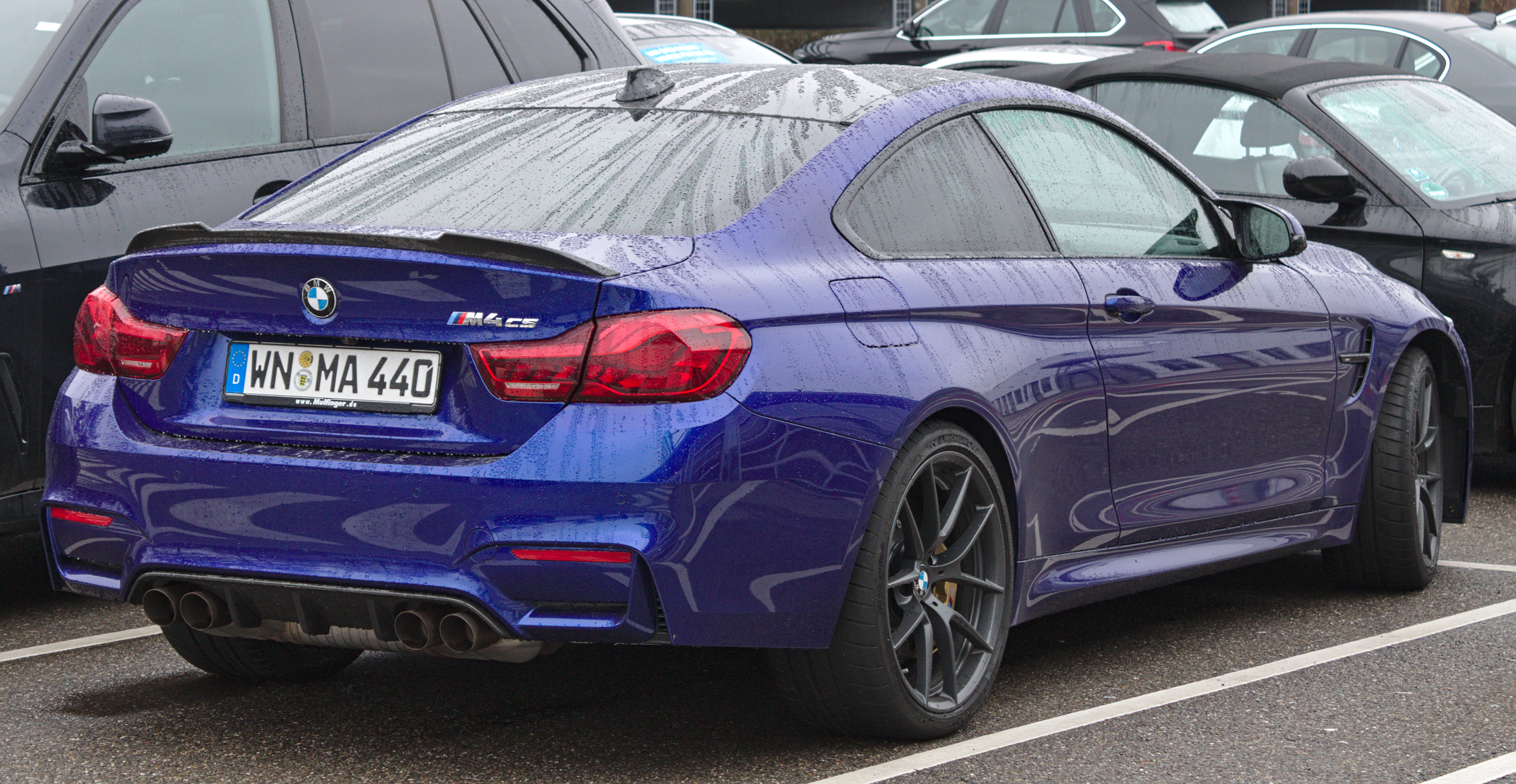
BMW M4 CS

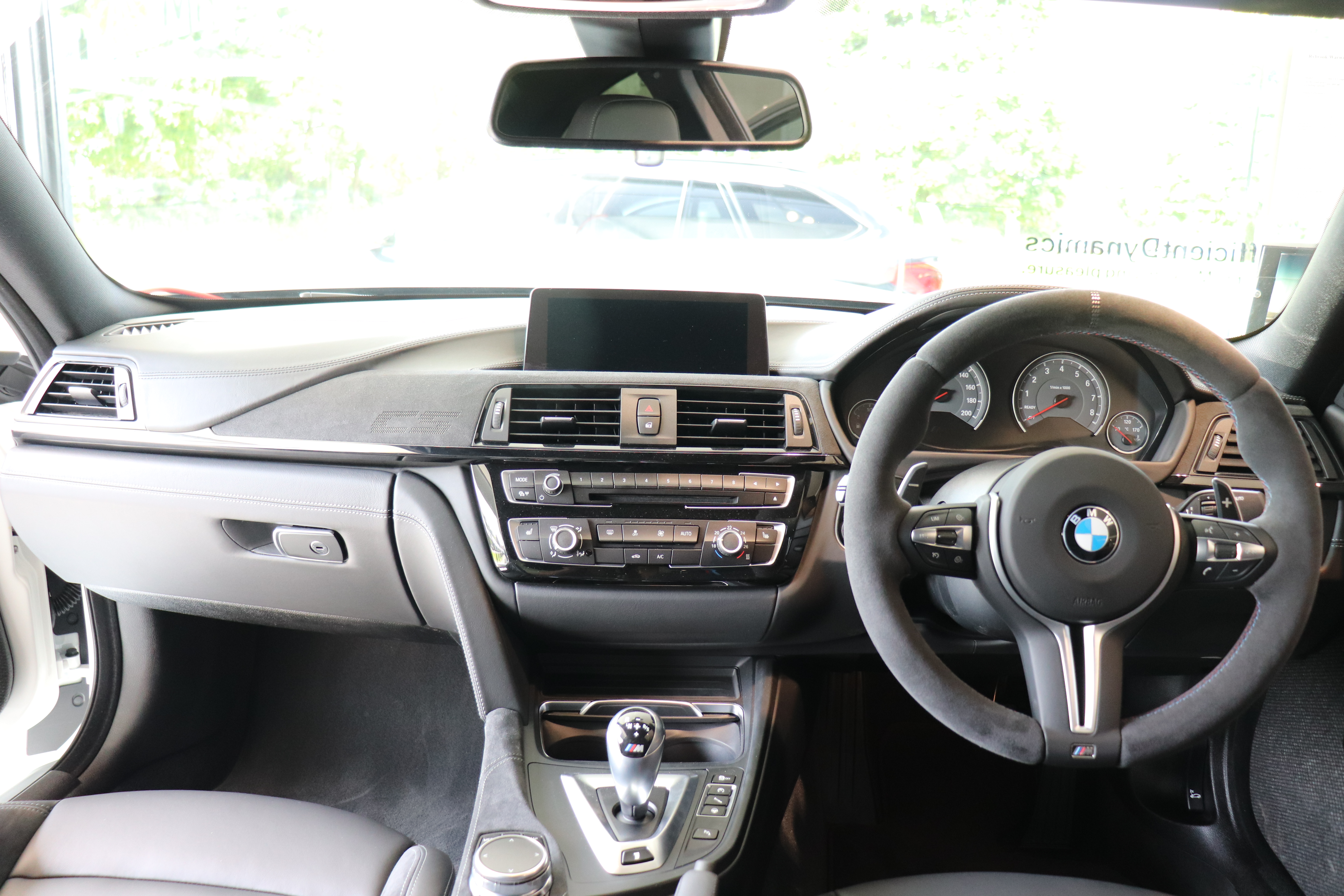
Interior

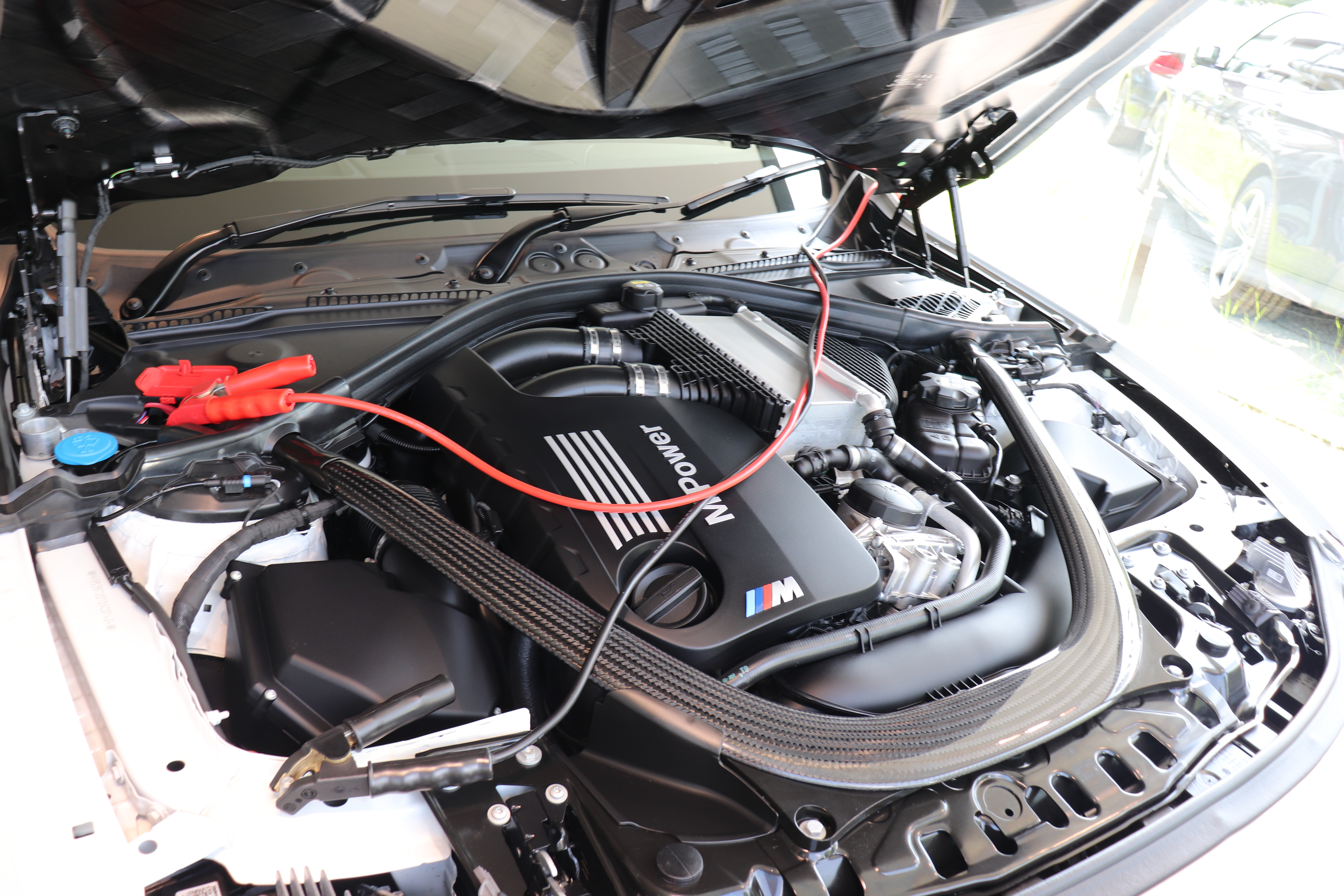
Engine bay

==== M4 Cabrio Edition 30 Jahre ====
This came in 2018 after it was initially released in 2016 for the BMW M3. This was limited to 300 units worldwide and celebrated 30 years of M3 convertible and M4 convertible driving. These cars came in Macao Blue, Mandarin II Uni and unique for the UK market a matte finished Frozen Dark Grey and the star-spoke 20-inch wheels came in bespoke Orbit Grey finish. Inside the finish came with two color option black and white and black and blue and these were fully extended leather. Also, door sills and carbon interior had the 30 Jahre etched in. There were no performance changes but the car was based on the M4 Competition. These cars did not come with the 360 camera system as one of the key options that was not offered.

More Info

==== M4 Edition M Heritage ====
This is the final edition BMW made for the M4 Limited to 750 units and 75 were sent to the UK. The new M4 Edition M Heritage is based on the existing M4 Coupe and engine was based on the M4 Competition. These came in three colours Laguna Seca Blue, Velvet Blue metallic and Imola red and were only in coupe variants. The changes to this car were in the interior where they came in three color schemes white and black, red and black and blue and black with the words M4 Heritage embossed on the seats, door sills and carbon trim.

More Info

=== Packages and Add-Ons ===
M Performance Parts can be fitted to all M4 models. These include a carbon fibre diffuser, a carbon fibre spoiler (F82 Only) (a flow through rear spoiler was also offered by BMW), a carbon fibre bumper winglet, a splitter, carbon fibre grills, carbon fibre engine cover, carbon fibre gear shifter, carbon fibre gear surround, carbon fibre and Alcantara handbrake, carbon fibre and Alcantara armrest, M Performance carbon fibre door sills, decals and black side skirts.

Other additional options as a retrofit were LCI rear lights, the Carbon Ceramic Brake Retrofit Kit, and M Performance Exhaust System which all could be bought and fitted by BMW.

== Second generation (G82/G83; 2020) ==
Second generation (G82)
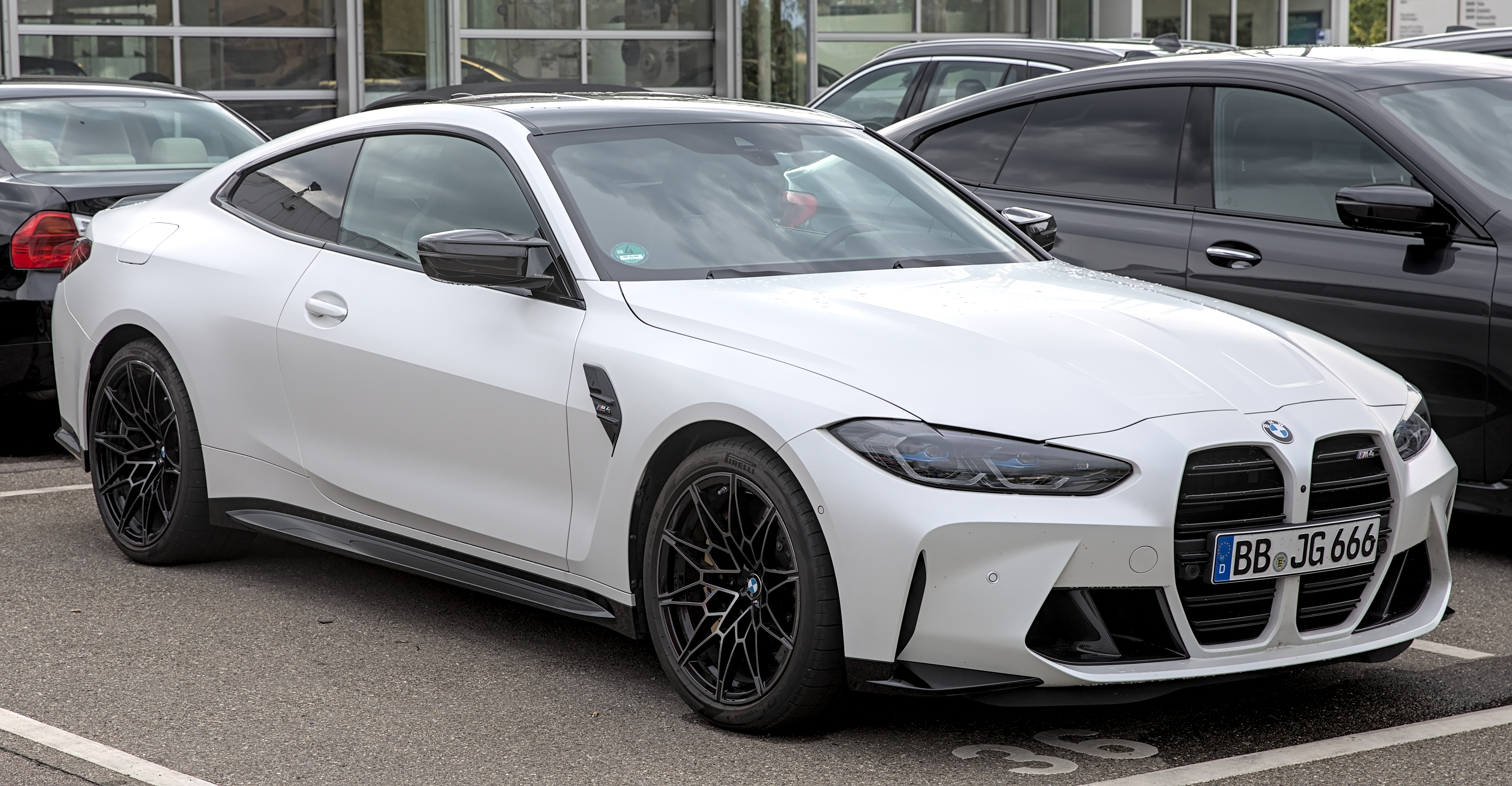
- BMW M4 (G82)

Overview
- Production: 2020–present
- Designer: Anne Forschner

Body and chassis
- Body style: 2-door coupé (G82); 2-door convertible (G83)
- Platform: BMW CLAR platform
- Related: BMW 4 Series (G22/G23); BMW M3 (G80/G81)

Powertrain
- Engine: 3.0 L S58B30T0 twin-turbo I6
- Transmission: 6-speed ZF GS6-53BZ manual; 8-speed ZF 8HP automatic transmission

Dimensions
- Wheelbase: 2,857 mm (112.5 in)
- Length: 4,803 mm (189.1 in)
- Width: 1,887 mm (74.3 in)
- Height: 1,391 mm (54.8 in)
- Curb weight: 1,682 kg (3,708 lb)

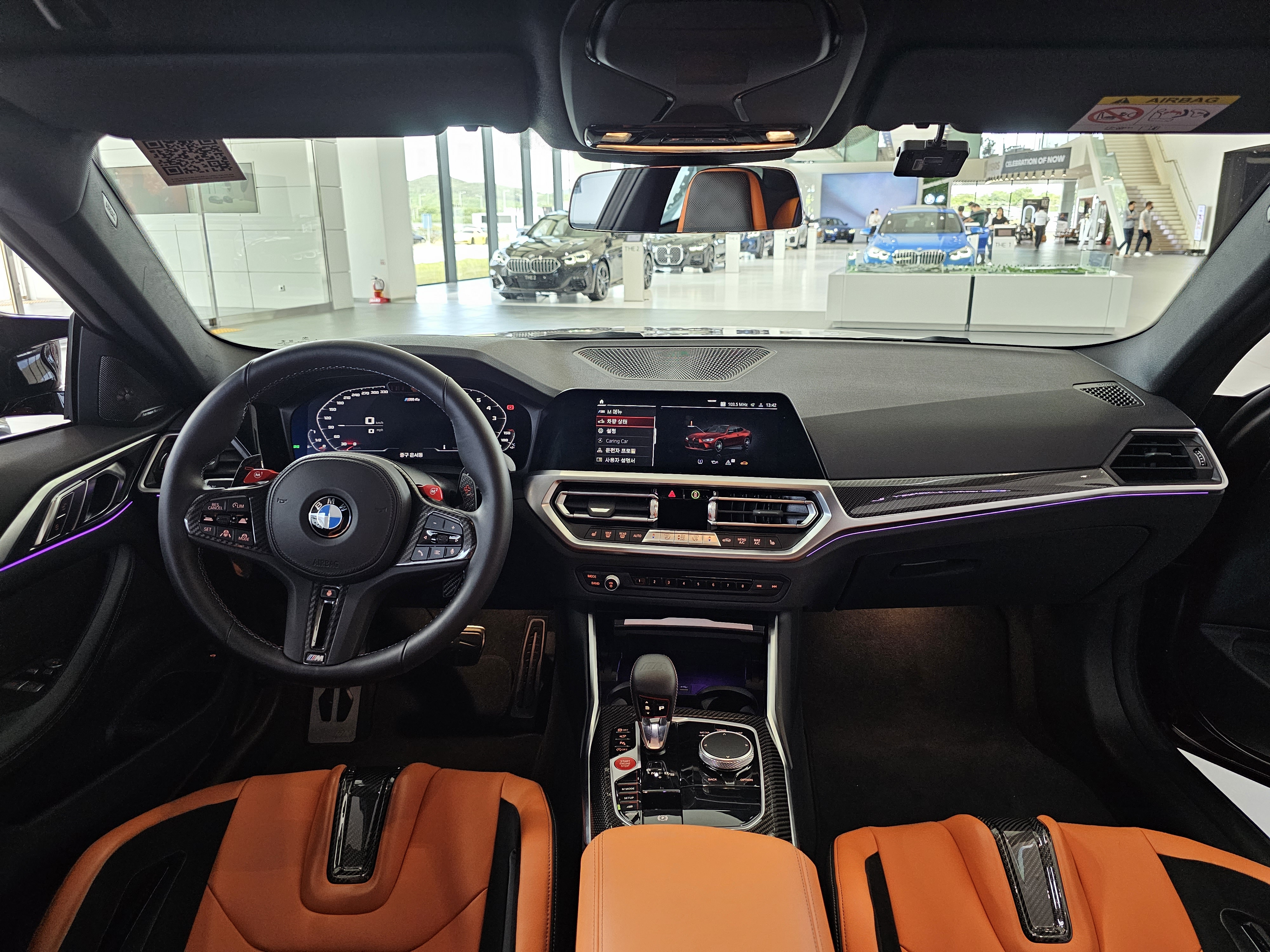
Interior

The second iteration of the BMW M4 (codenamed G82) is largely based on the standard 4 Series (G22 generation), which was previewed by the BMW Concept 4. It is a high performance version of the standard G22 4 Series. Prototypes of the M4 were testing on the Nürburgring beside the G80 BMW M3. The first units were assembled in November 2020, with global deliveries starting in early 2021.

Two of the most notable changes for the G82 M4 are the power output of 473 hp (353 kW), which is a 35 kW (47 hp; 47 hp) increase over the previous M4, as well as the adoption of the controversial twin-kidney grille front end design from the G22 4 Series.

The convertible version of the new M4 was introduced in May 2021. Like the standard new-generation 4 Series Convertible, the M4 Convertible (internal designation G83) has a folding soft top. It normally opens/closes in 18 seconds, at speeds up to 50 km/h (31 mph). The convertible is available as a Competition model with the M xDrive. The top speed is electronically limited to 250 km/h (155 mph), but with the optional M Driver's Package, it can increase to 280 km/h (174 mph). It can accelerate from 0–100 km/h (0–62 mph) in 3.6 seconds.

For the North American market, only the manual transmission will be available in the standard M4 while the M4 Competition only is available with an automatic transmission.

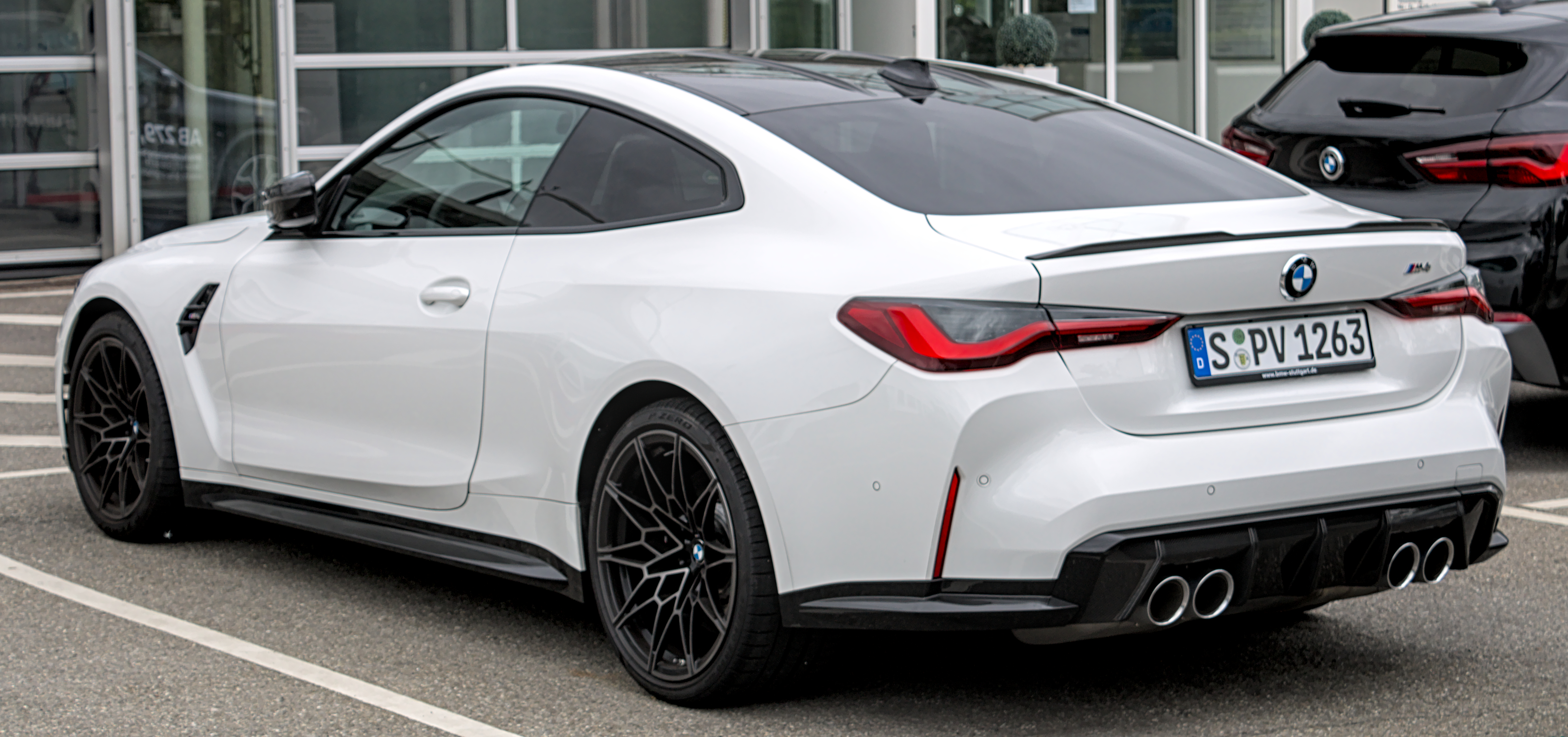
BMW M4 (G82) Rear

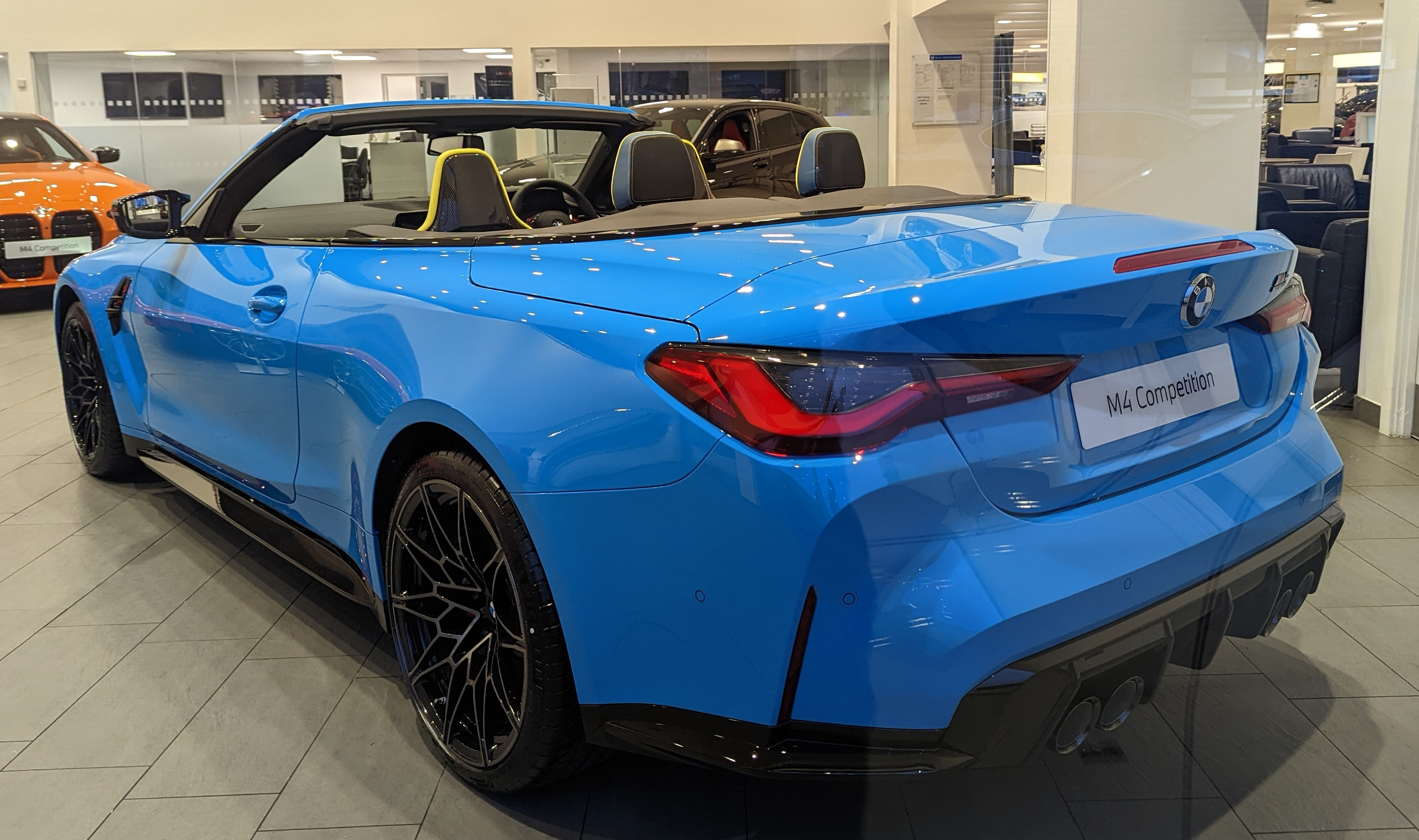
BMW M4 Competition (G83)

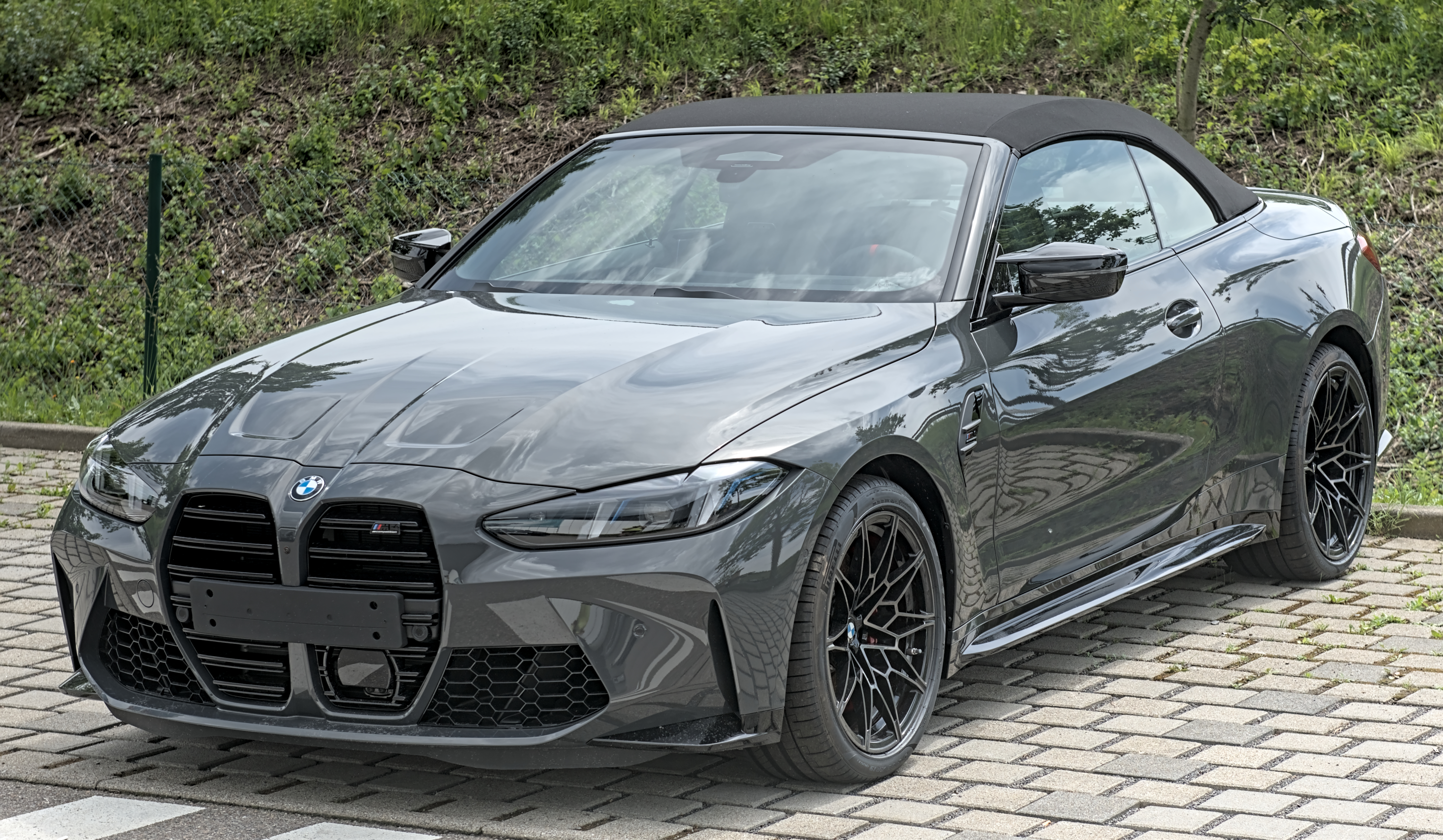
G83 facelift

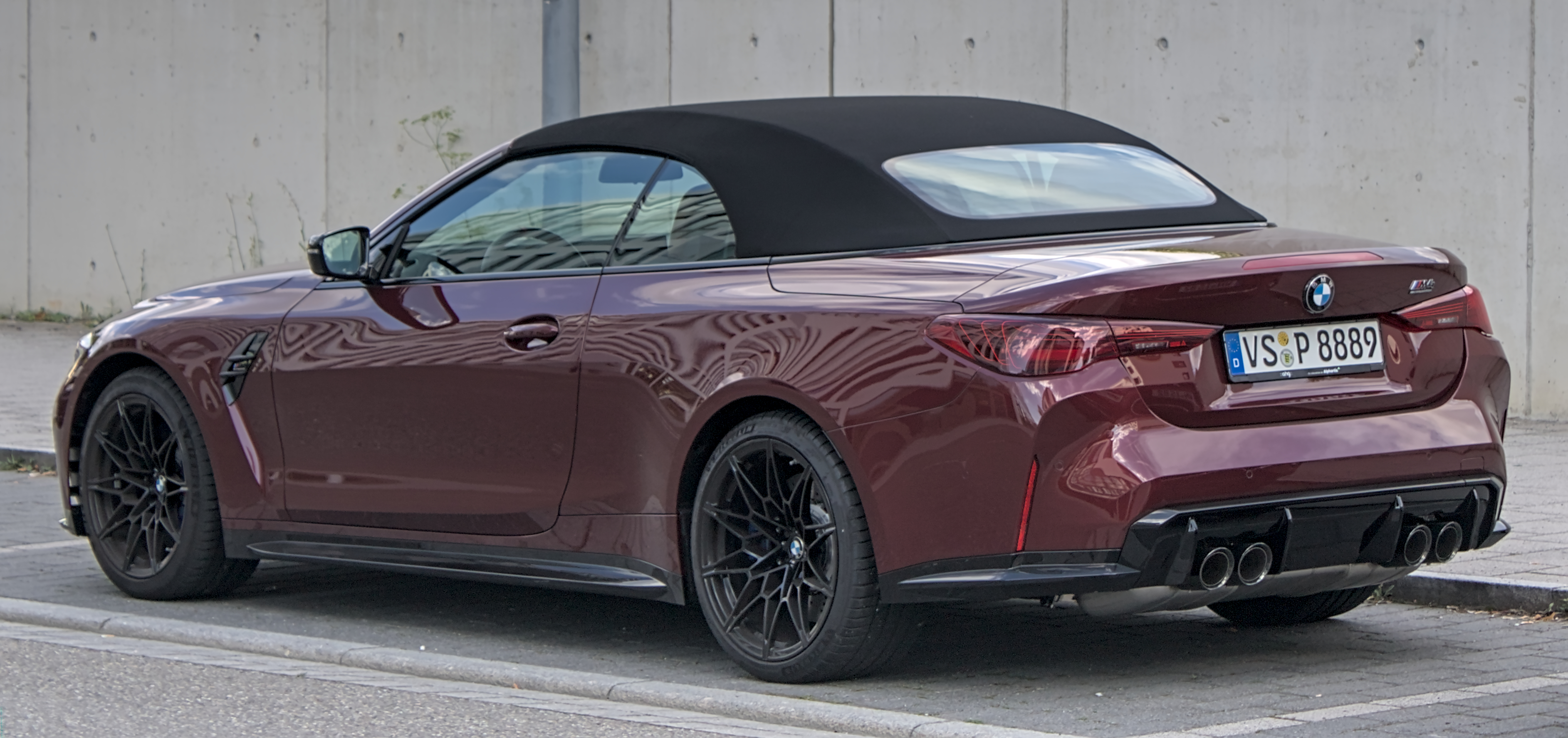
G83 facelift

For the Thailand market, the manual transmission will be available in the standard M4, while the automatic transmission will be available in the M4 Competition.

For the Philippine market, only the automatic transmission will be available in the M4 Competition.

=== M4 Competition ===
At launch in 2020, the M4 Competition model was unveiled alongside the standard M4 model. Compared to the standard M4, the M4 Competition increases power output by 22 kW (30 PS; 30 hp) to a total of 375 kW (510 PS; 503 hp), and torque is increased by 100 N⋅m (74 lb⋅ft) to 650 N⋅m (479 lb⋅ft). It is offered exclusively with an 8-speed M Steptronic Sport automatic transmission. The M4 Competition also features a separate transmission oil cooler, black chrome exhaust tips, forged M light-alloy wheels, automatic brake hold function, and high-gloss black mirrors.

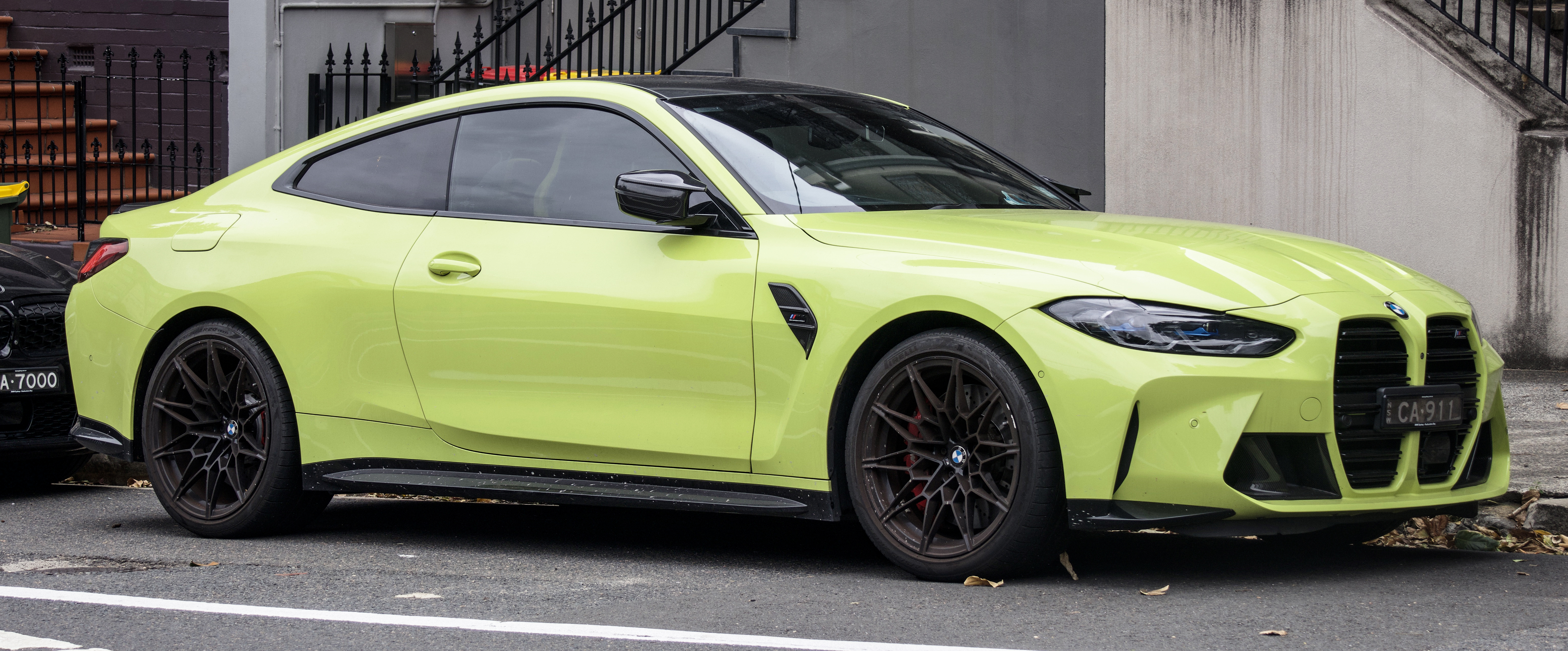
BMW M4 Competition

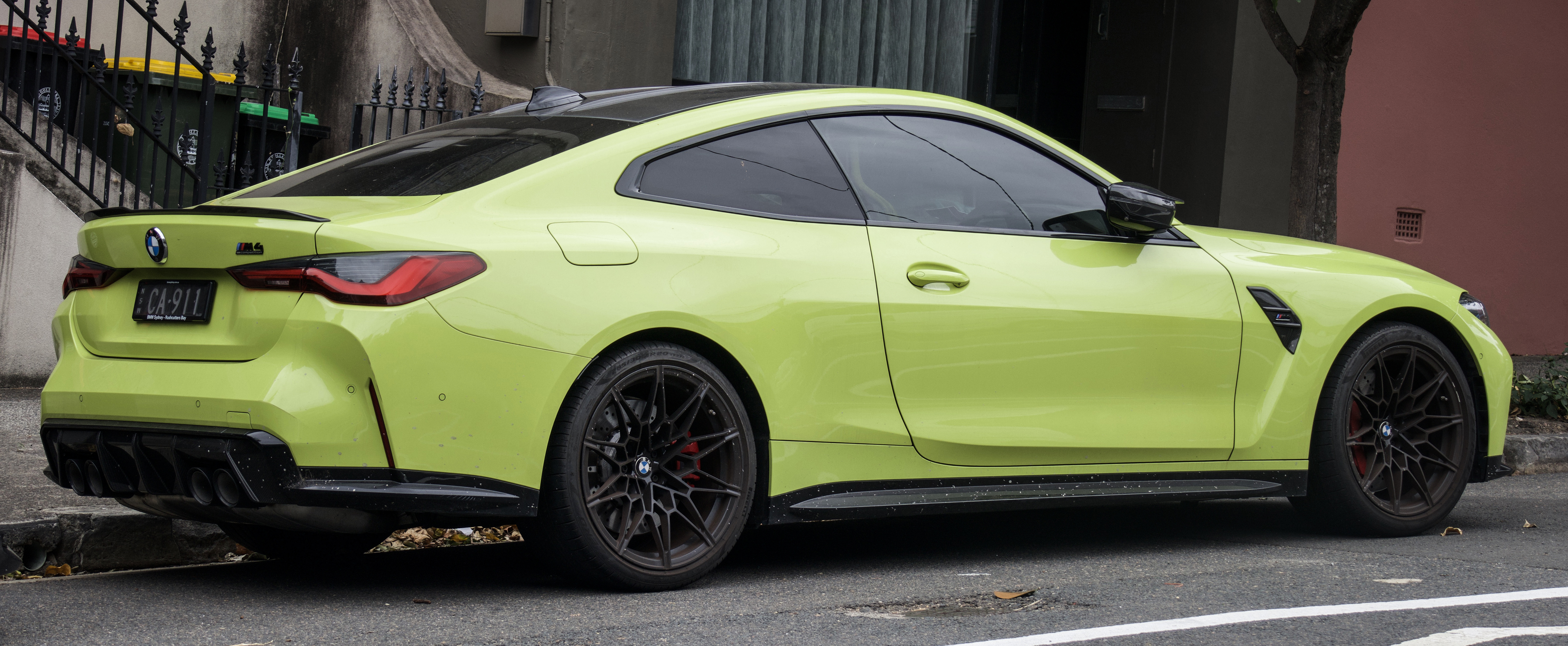
BMW M4 Competition

==== xDrive ====
Competition models equipped with xDrive are quicker from 0-60 mph when compared to RWD models, clocking in at 2.8 seconds, as compared to 3.6 seconds for RWD.

==== M4 CSL ====
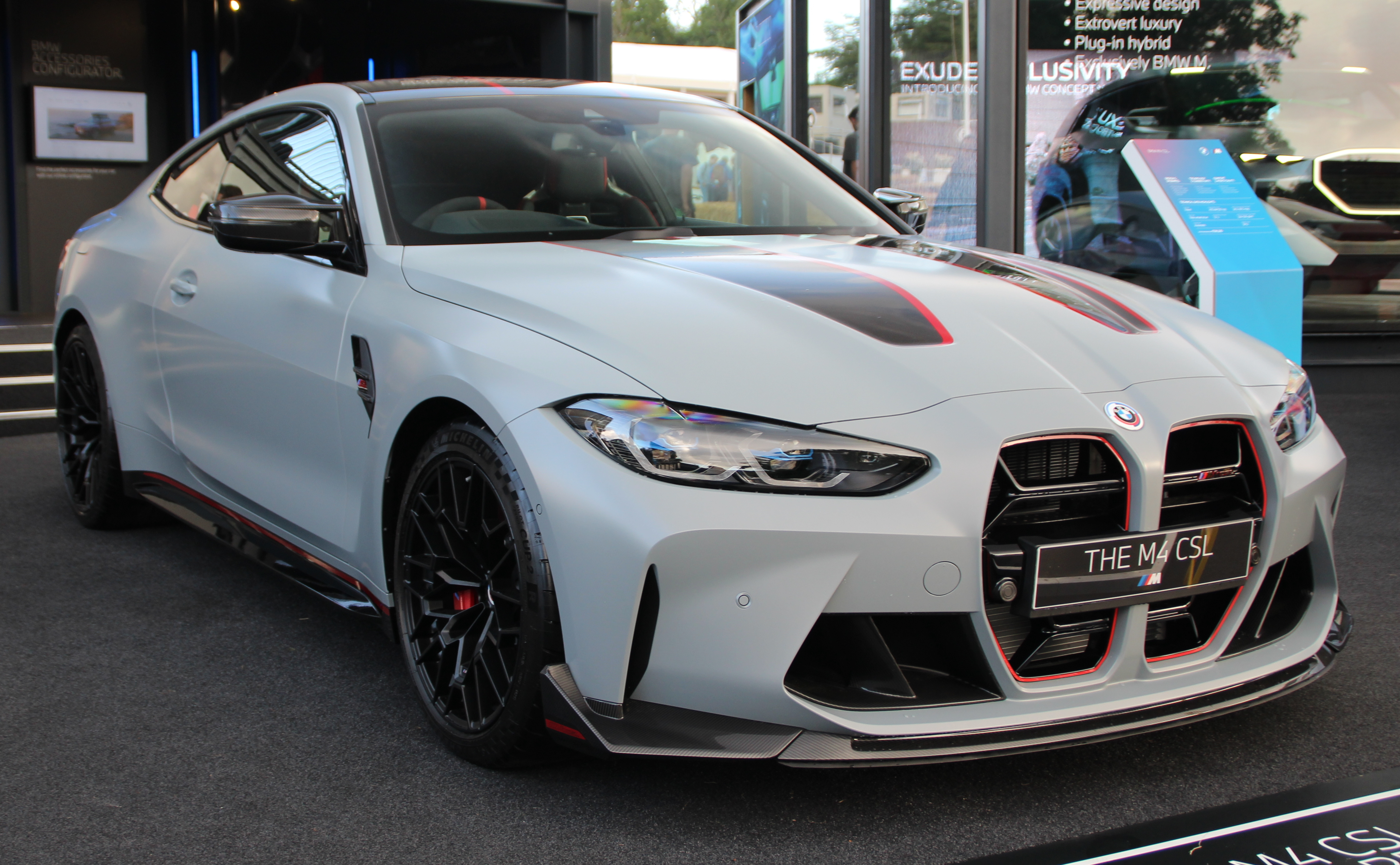
M4 CSL

At the 2017 Frankfurt Auto Show, Frank Van Meel, head of BMW's M division, announced that the CSL nameplate would be making a return, replacing the GTS in the performance model monikers. On May 4 of 2022, BMW announced that the M4 CSL would debut at the 2022 Concorso d'Eleganza Villa d'Este. Changes include weight reduction of around 200 lb (91 kg), hence the CSL name, which stands for Coupe Sport Leichtbau (Lightweight Sport Coupe), as well as a large front carbon fiber front splitter, a ducktail rear spoiler, and a power increase to 543 hp (551 PS; 405 kW). A total of 1,000 units were made.

==== M4 CS ====
In May, 2024, BMW announced an all-new M4 CS, which features a more powerful version of the S58 6-cylinder twin turbo engine that produces 405 kW (543 hp), a 15 kW (20 hp) increase over the normal M4 Competition, BMW also said that the M4 CS weighs 35 kg (77 lb) less than a M4 Competition xDrive. These improvements allow it to accelerate from 0 to 100 km/h (62 mph) in 3.4 seconds. The M4 CS base MSRP starts at $123,500

The CS also arrives with a specially tuned chassis that features revised wheel camber settings and anti-roll bars intended to improve handling; a cast aluminum strut brace increases torsional rigidity. BMW also recalibrated the adaptive dampers and the electrically assisted steering system.

BMW claimed it recorded a 7:21:99 lap time around the Nürburgring Nordschleife track.

=== M Performance Parts ===
M Performance Parts can be fitted to all models. These include a wing, carbon fibre side skirts, an M Performance Exhaust system, canards, a carbon fibre splitter, a carbon fibre diffuser and rear ground effects. The M Performance currently released one set of design style that has been produced by many different factories. The G80 and G82 M3, M4 are the only G chassis M available with M performance design.

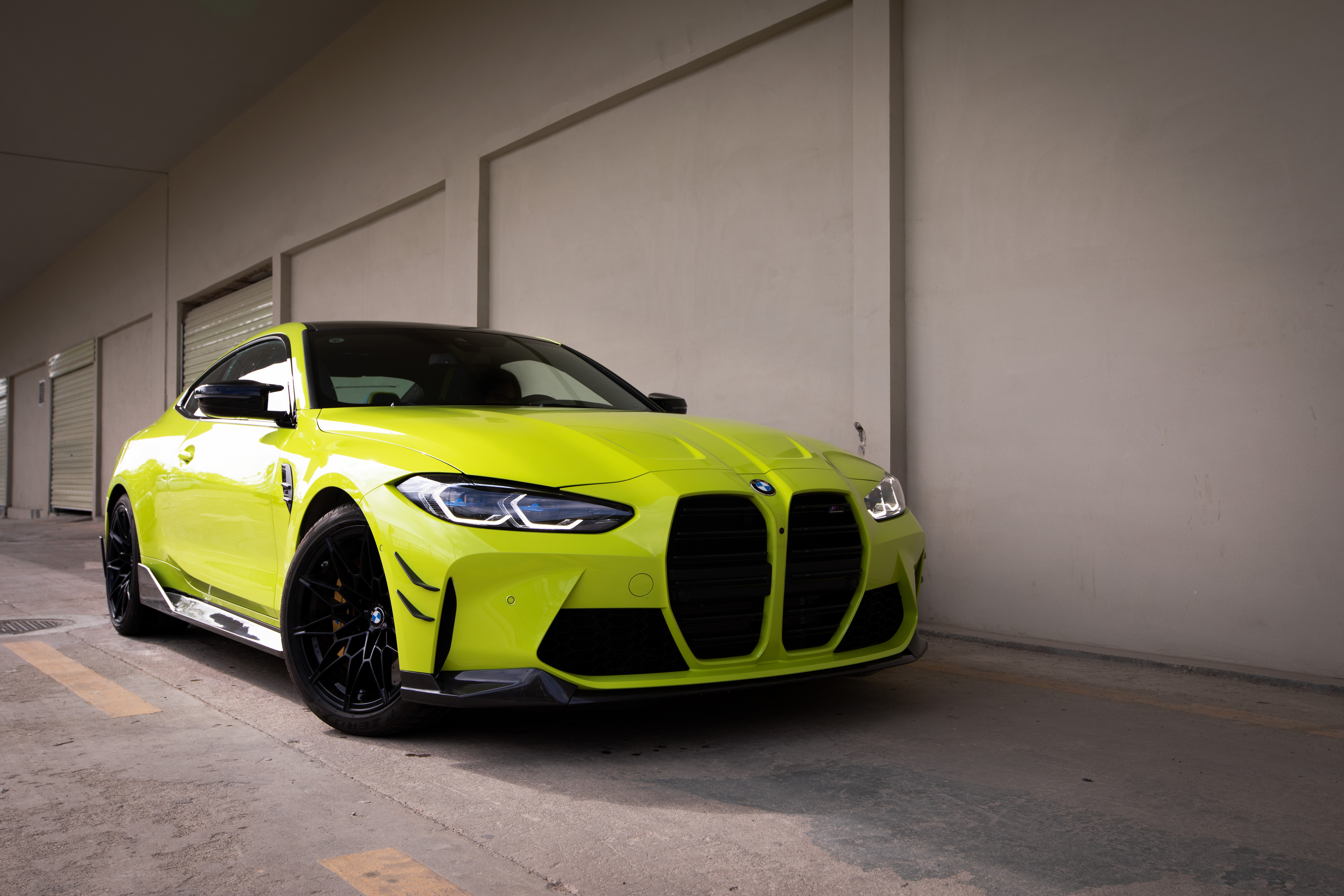
G82 M4 Mp look front side. Parts produced by individual third party.

=== Special editions ===
==== M4 x KITH ====
In October 2020, BMW released their collaboration with Kith, a lifestyle brand centered around fashion, for the G82 generation M4. The car has been named BMW M4 x KITH. Production was limited to only 150 units worldwide and they have a slight premium over the basic form 2021 BMW M4. Slight differences are noticed on the seats with a specific colouration with kith embossed multiple times on the headrest, creating a specific pattern. The carbon roof has the Kith logo. Exterior-wise the car is fully matte black, silver and white.

==== 3.0 CSL ====
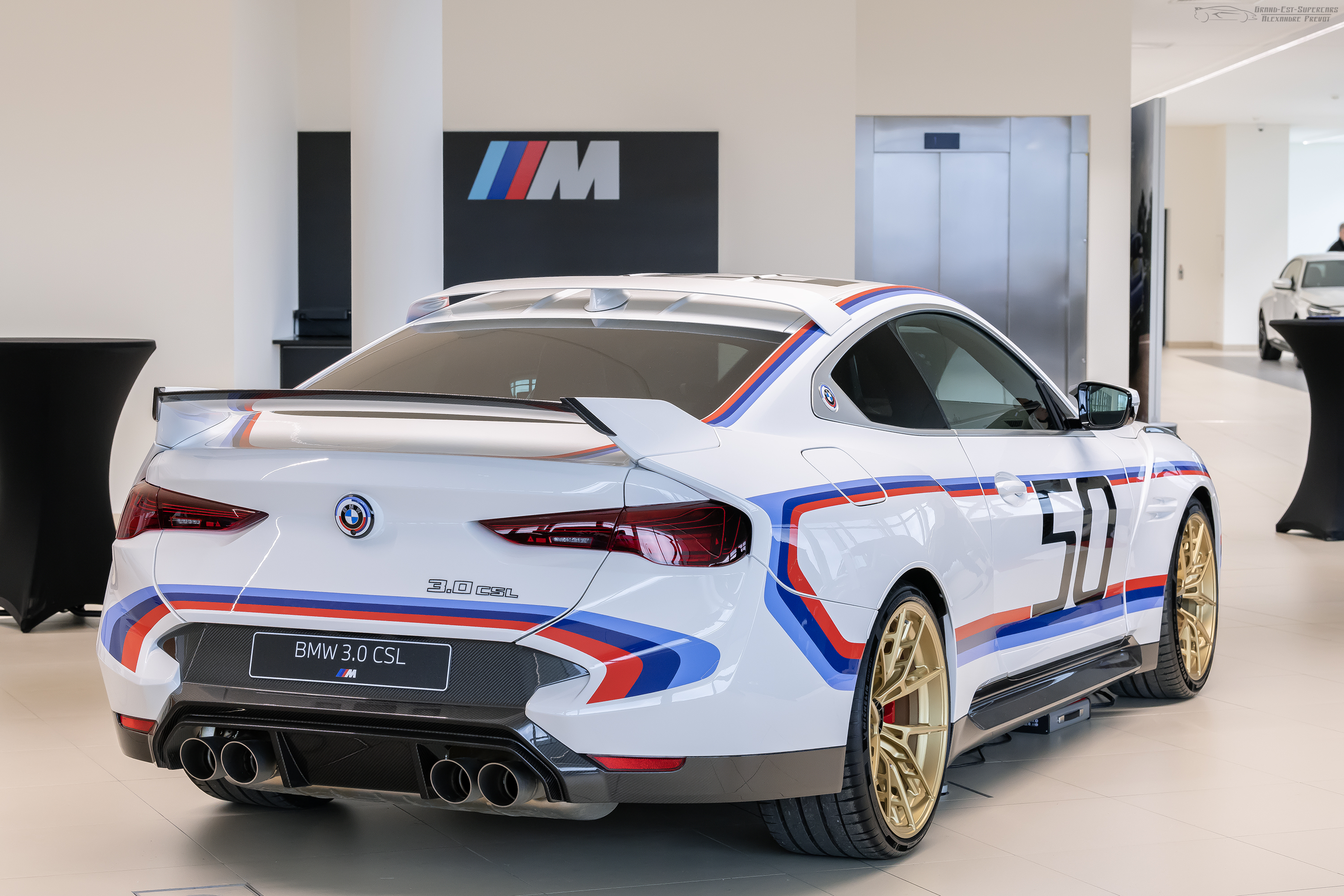
3.0 CSL

On 24 November 2022, BMW revealed its the BMW 3.0 CSL with a more powerful 3.0-liter Inline-six cylinder engine which generates a power of 412 kW (560 PS; 553 hp) and 550 N⋅m (406 lb⋅ft) of torque to celebrate BMW M's 50th Anniversary. 50 units were produced. All CSL cars were fully handmade at the BMW Stuttgart plant.

==== BMW M 50 Jahre ====
In Europe and other selected sales regions, BMW M GmbH offered the "M4 Edition 50 Jahre BMW M" to mark its anniversary. The exclusive two-door Coupé came in the BMW Individual exterior colours Carbon Black, Macao Blue, Brands Hatch Grey, Imola Red and San Marino Blue. The production number was limited to a total of 700 units for the M4 and 500 units for the M3, fitted with 19-inch M forged wheels on the front axle and 20-inch wheels on the rear axle featuring a double-spoke design, which were offered for the first time in the matte colours Orbit Grey and Gold Bronze.

In addition, a similarly limited number of edition vehicles of the BMW M4 Coupé were produced for the Chinese automotive market and available in the exterior paint finishes Fire Orange and Stratus Grey. This colour selection relates to the fact that the anniversary of BMW M GmbH is being celebrated in China in the Year of the Tiger. The M forged wheels on these vehicles are finished in matte Orbit Grey paired with the Fire Orange body colour, and in matte Gold Bronze with the Stratus Grey exterior paint finish.

For the 50 Jahre Edition vehicles based on the BMW M4 Coupé, they include door sill panels bearing “Edition 50 Jahre BMW M” inscriptions, a metal plaque on the centre console with the lettering “M4 Edition 50 Jahre BMW M,” and a corresponding imprint on the headrests of the standard M sports seats or optional M carbon bucket seats for driver and front passenger.

G82/G83 M4 specs
On sale	Model	Power	Torque	Curb Weight	Transmission	Top Speed	Drivetrain
3/2021	M4	353 kW (480 PS; 473 hp)	550 N⋅m (406 lb⋅ft)	1,674 kg (3,691 lb)	6-speed Manual	250 km/h (155 mph) 290 km/h (180 mph) with M drivers package	RWD
3/2021	M4 Competition	375 kW (510 PS; 503 hp)	650 N⋅m (479 lb⋅ft)	1,700 kg (3,748 lb)	8-speed Automatic	250 km/h (155 mph) 290 km/h (180 mph) with M drivers package	RWD
8/2021	M4 Competition xDrive	375 kW (510 PS; 503 hp)	650 N⋅m (479 lb⋅ft)	1,775 kg (3,913 lb)	8-speed Automatic	250 km/h (155 mph) 290 km/h (180 mph) with M drivers package	4WD
11/2021	M4 Competition Convertible xDrive	375 kW (510 PS; 503 hp)	650 N⋅m (479 lb⋅ft)	1,953 kg (4,306 lb)	8-speed Automatic	250 km/h (155 mph) 280 km/h (174 mph) with the M drivers Package	4WD
5/2025	M4 CS	405 kW (551 PS; 543 hp)	650 N⋅m (479 lb⋅ft)	1,755 kg (3,869 lb)	8-speed Automatic	302 km/h (188 mph)	4WD
06/2022	M4 CSL	405 kW (551 PS; 543 hp)	650 N⋅m (479 lb⋅ft)	1,625 kg (3,583 lb)	8-speed Automatic	307 km/h (191 mph)	RWD
04/11/2022	3.0 CSL	412 kW (560 PS; 553 hp)	550 N⋅m (406 lb⋅ft)	1,625 kg (3,583 lb)	6-speed Manual		RWD

== Motorsport ==
=== M4 DTM ===
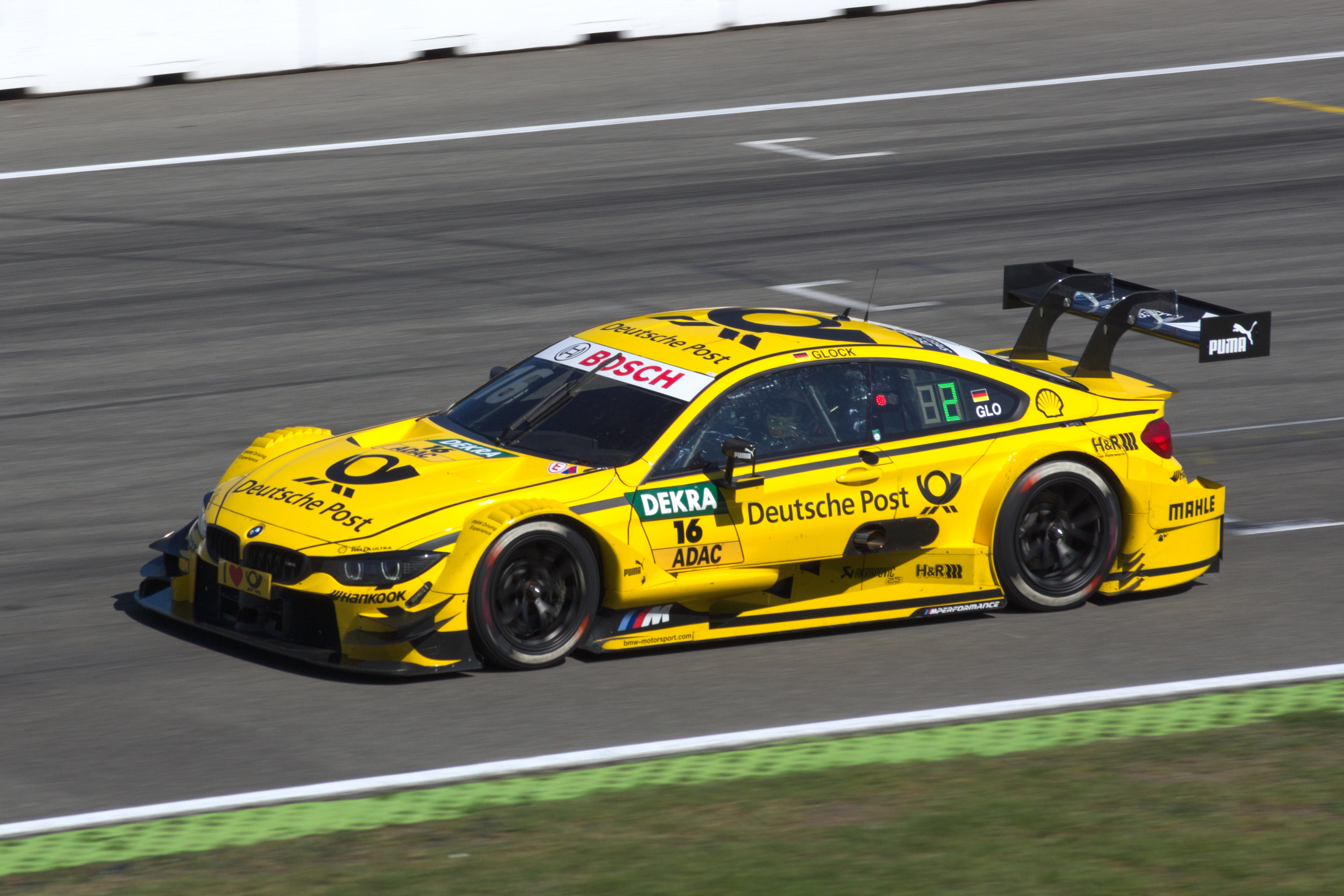
BMW M4 DTM of Timo Glock competing at Hockenheim in 2016

The naturally-aspirated BMW M4 DTM competed in the Deutsche Tourenwagen Masters from 2014 to 2018. Marco Wittmann won the 2014 and 2016 championships.

=== M4 GT4 ===
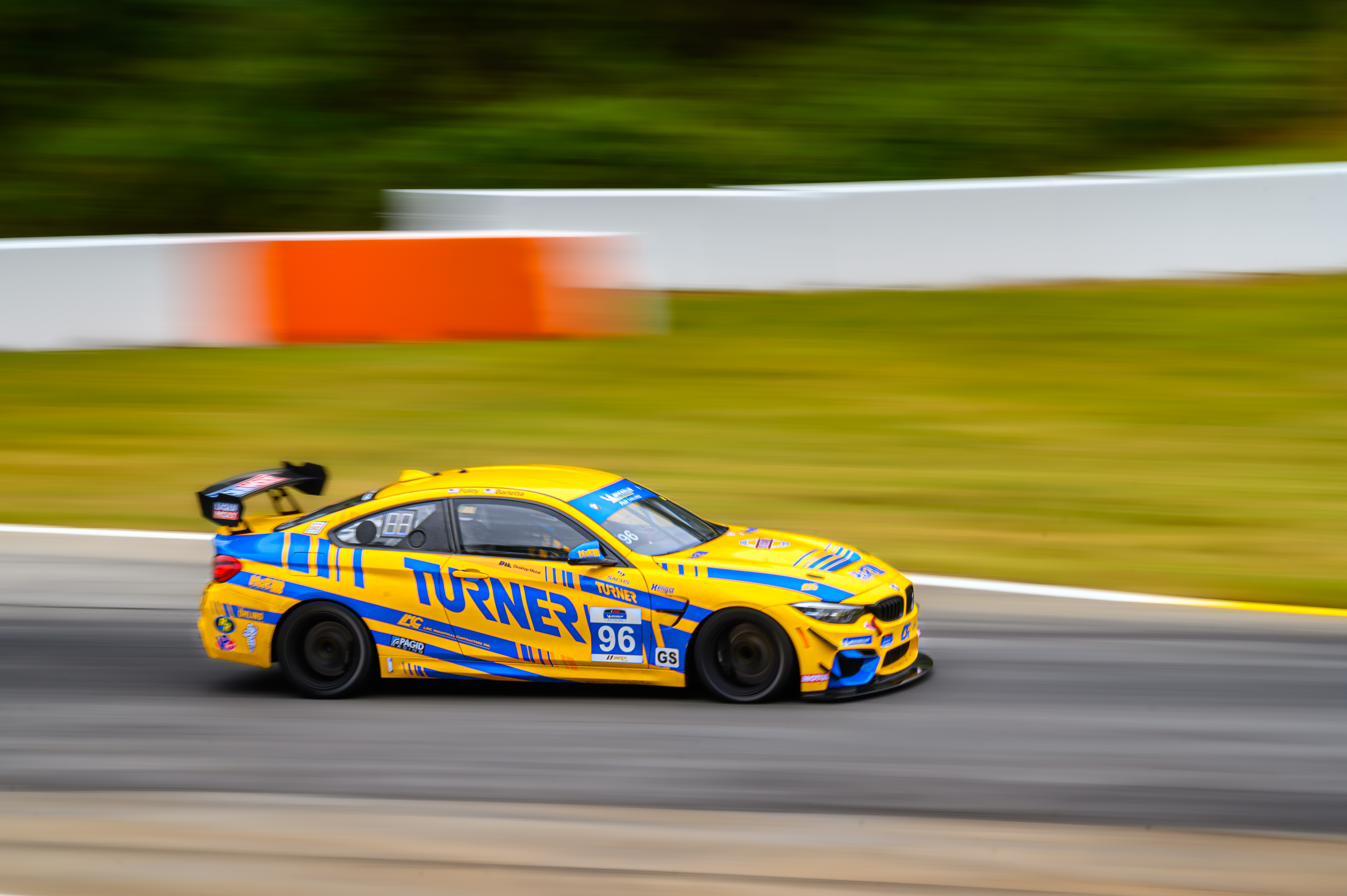
BMW M4 GT4 of Vin Barletta and Robby Foley at the 2019 Petit Le Mans.

The F82 BMW M4 GT4 is a competition version of the road car, sharing the 3.0 L turbocharged straight-six engine and DCT (dual-clutch transmission). Reuse of these elements of the road car, and of shared electronics systems including the TCS, are aimed at cost, maintenance, and driveability, with further race engineering reused from the GT3 version. Chassis are homologated under the SRO GT4 category, aimed at amateur drivers, with the engine trimmed to 317 kW (431 PS; 425 hp) in line with the Balance of Performance regulations. The car debuted at the 2017 24 Hours of Nürburgring. In 2023, the M4 GT4 was updated to the G82 model, featuring an updated 3.0 L engine with up to 405 kW (551 PS; 543 hp) and ZF 8HP (automatic) transmission (configured for manual shifting), which could be purchased for 187,000 Euros. An Evo version was introduced in 2025, featuring improved traction control, a new front splitter and mounting, and new LED headlights and rear lights.

=== M4 GT3 ===
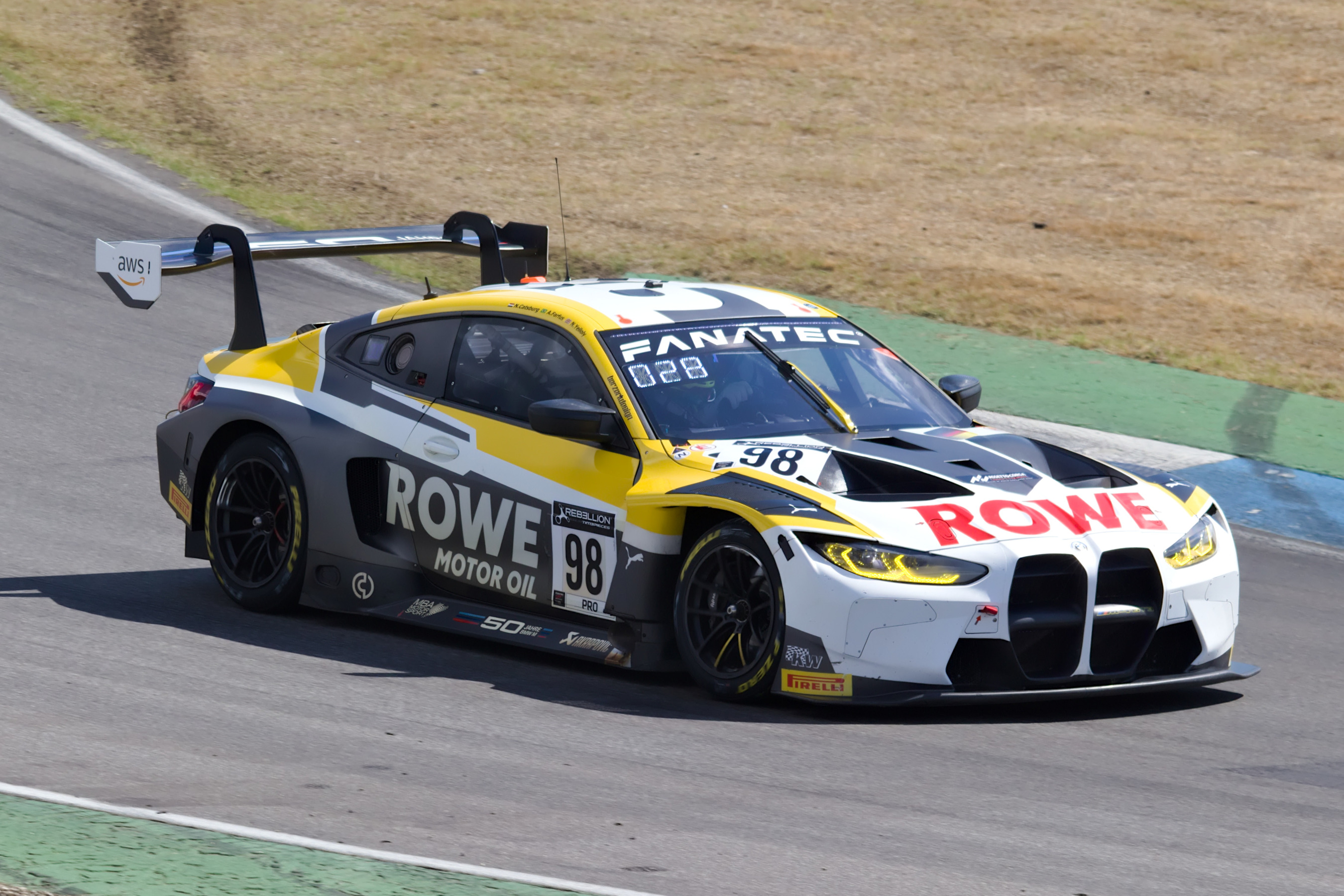
The No. 98 BMW M4 GT3 of Rowe Racing competing in the 2022 GT World Challenge Europe series at Hockenheimring.

The BMW M4 GT3 is a racecar version of the G82 BMW M4, homologated under the FIA Group GT3 category, which also enables entry to SRO, IMSA and ADAC competition. It is the successor to the BMW M6 GT3, racing from the 2022 season. The M4 GT3 uses a race-prepped variant of the inline-six from the road car. Features changed from the road-going version off the car include widened fenders and bodywork, more angular styling for the hood, exhaust exits just after the passenger side front wheel on the right side of the car, inlets on the sides of the wider rear fenders and a gooseneck-mounted spoiler and rear diffuser manage the airflow. Additionally, the steering wheel can be used in racing simulators without modifications. Deliveries started in late 2021.

==== M4 GT3 Evo ====
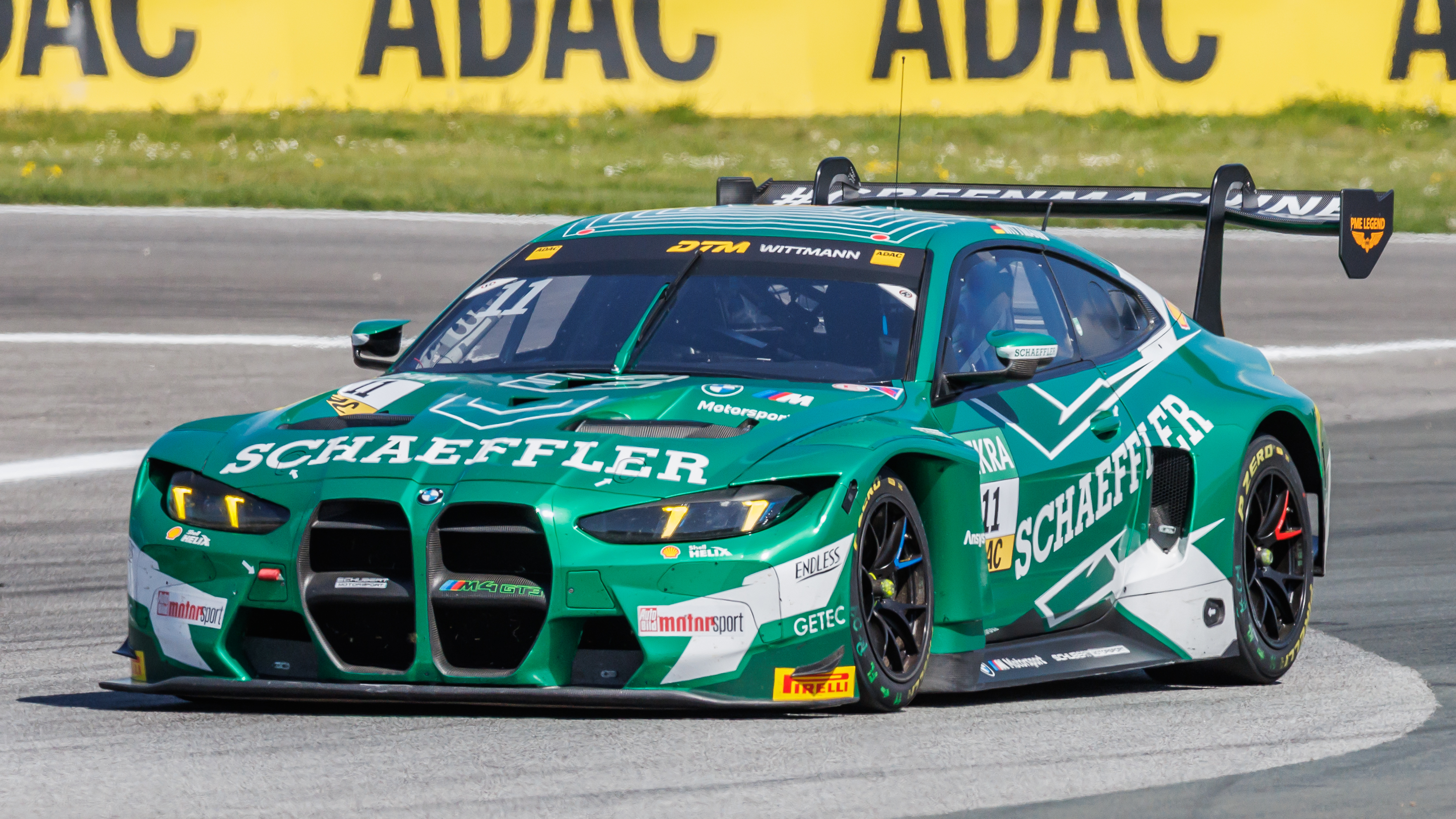
The No. 11 BMW M4 GT3 Evo of Schubert Motorsport in the 2025 DTM series at the Oschersleben.

An Evo version of the M4 GT3 was announced at the 2024 Nürburgring 24 Hours, with the car featuring new side mirrors, new head- and taillights and larger air inlets, while also being more reliable and easier to drive. Other upgrades include new anti-roll bars on both axles, larger rear brake discs, and easier-to-adjust differential to ensure less tyre and brake wear to improve drivability. The M4 GT3 Evo made its debut at the 2025 Dubai 24 Hour, where it managed to take the overall victory.
