= BMW =

German automotive manufacturer

Bayerische Motoren Werke AG
- Corporate logotype since 2021

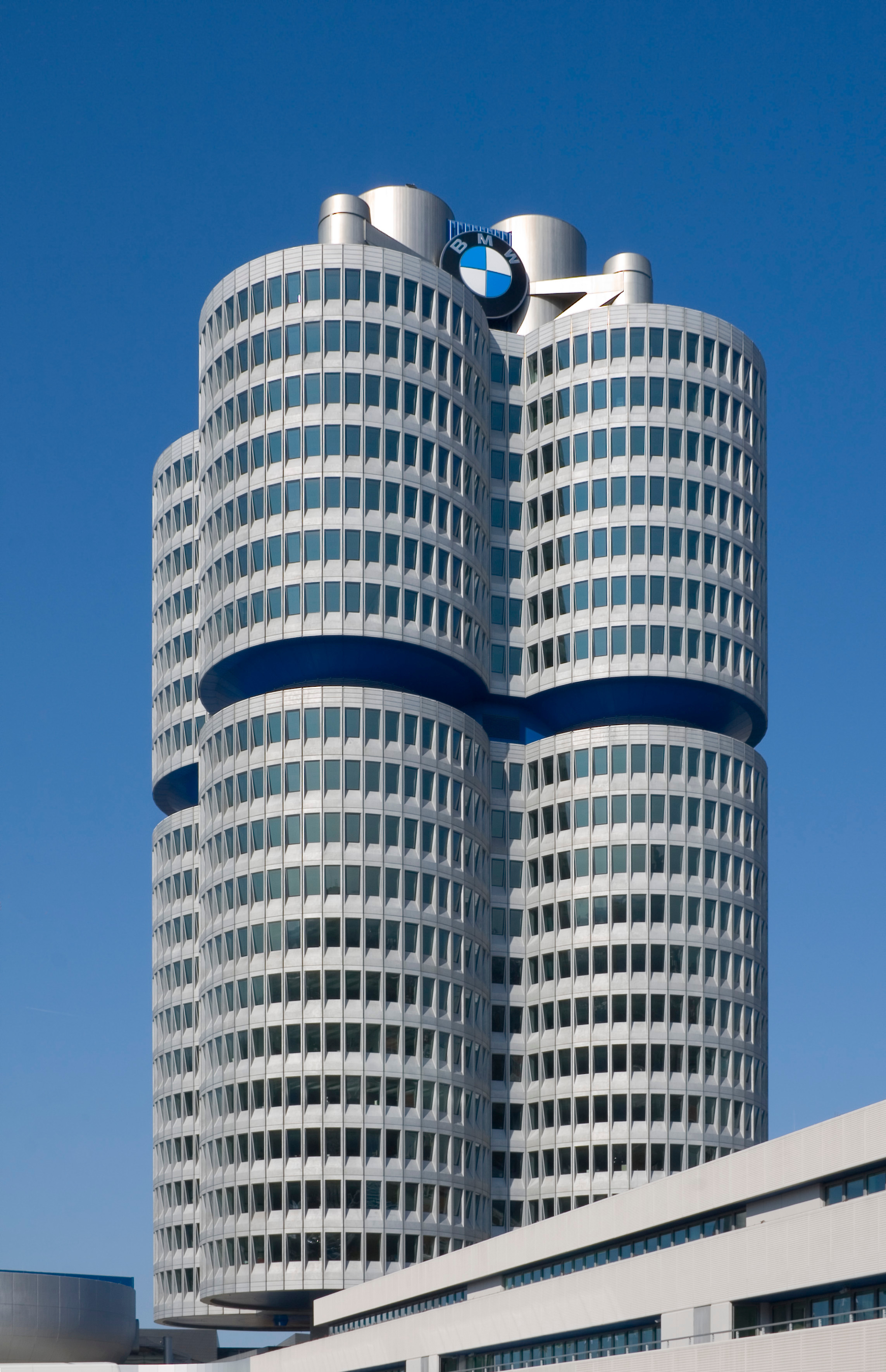
- BMW Headquarters in Munich, Germany
- Type: Public
- Traded as: FWB: BMW; DAX component
- Industry: Automotive
- Predecessors: Otto Flugmaschinenfabrik; Rapp Motorenwerke; Fahrzeugfabrik Eisenach
- Founded: 7 March 1916; 110 years ago (official date) 1922; 104 years ago (de facto date)
- Founders: Camillo Castiglioni; Franz Josef Popp
- Headquarters: Munich, Germany
- Area served: Worldwide
- Key people: Milan Nedeljković (chairman of management board); Nicolas Peter (chairman of supervisory board)
- Products: Cars; motorcycles; bicycles
- Production output: ▲2,463,681 cars (2025); ▼202,563 motorcycles (2025)
- Brands: Automobiles; BMW (i, M, X, Z, Alpina); Mini; Rolls-Royce; Motorcycles; BMW Motorrad
- Services: Car-sharing services, financing, leasing, insurance and other financial services
- Revenue: ▼€133.453 billion (2025)
- Operating income: ▼€10.236 billion (2025)
- Net income: ▼€7.451 billion (2025)
- Total assets: ▼€265.967 billion (2025)
- Total equity: ▲€97.906 billion (2025)
- Owners: Stefan Quandt (27.7%); Susanne Klatten (22.5%); Public float (48.5%)
- Number of employees: 154,540 (2025)
- Website: www.bmwgroup.com (corporate); www.bmwusa.com (brand)

Bayerische Motoren Werke AG, trading as BMW Group (commonly abbreviated to BMW (German pronunciation: [ˌbeːʔɛmˈveː]), sometimes anglicised as Bavarian Motor Works), is a German multinational conglomerate manufacturer of luxury vehicles and motorcycles headquartered in Munich, Germany. The moniker "BMW" first came into use when the German firm Rapp Motorenwerke changed its name to Bayerische Motoren Werke GmbH (BMW GmbH) in 1917. Thereafter, in 1922, the name and assets of BMW GmbH were transferred to the aircraft manufacturer Bayerische Flugzeugwerke AG (formerly Otto Flugmaschinenfabrik), thereby giving rise to the company known today as BMW AG.

BMW AG's automobiles are marketed under the BMW, Mini, and Rolls-Royce brands while its motorcycles are marketed under the BMW Motorrad brand. In 2023, BMW became the world's ninth-largest producer of motor vehicles (with 2,555,341 vehicles made in that year alone) as well as the 6th largest automaker by revenue. In 2023, it was ranked 46th in the Forbes Global 2000. The company also has significant motor-sport history, especially in touring cars, sports cars, and the Isle of Man TT. BMW initially focused on aircraft engine production during World War I, a legacy that influenced the company's engineering emphasis on performance and precision. Known as "The Ultimate Driving Machine", the brand is celebrated for engineering vehicles that blend high-end luxury with sharp, driver-focused performance. Following postwar restrictions on aircraft manufacturing, BMW diversified into motorcycle production in the 1920s and later entered the automobile market, establishing itself as a major player in the automotive industry.

BMW AG is headquartered in Munich and produces motor vehicles in Germany, United Kingdom, United States, Brazil, Mexico, South Africa, India, and China. The Quandt family is a long-term shareholder of the company, following investments by the brothers Herbert and Harald Quandt in 1959 which saved BMW from bankruptcy, with remaining shares owned by the public.

== History ==
BMW traces its origins to aircraft engine manufacturer [Otto Flugmaschinenfabrik,] founded in 1910 by Gustav Otto in the Kingdom of Bavaria, German Empire. On 18 August 1916, the firm was reorganized as Bayerische Flugzeugwerke (BFW). In 1922, BFW was renamed Bayerische Motoren Werke (BMW).

The name BMW, however, had earlier been used by a company founded in 1913 by Karl Rapp as Rapp Motorenwerke. In 1922, the name and engine-production assets of Rapp Motorenwerke were transferred to Bayerische Flugzeugwerke, which adopted the BMW name in the same year.

BMW's first products were aircraft engines for the Luftstreitkräfte. One of its early designs was the BMW IIIa, a straight-six engine developed in 1917 by engineer Max Friz. After World War I, BMW diversified into the production of motorcycle engines, agricultural equipment, household items, and railway brakes. In 1923, the company introduced its first motorcycle, the BMW R32.

BMW became an automobile manufacturer in 1928 following its acquisition of Fahrzeugfabrik Eisenach, which produced the Austin 7 under licence from Austin Motor Company, marketed as the Dixi. The first car sold as a BMW was the BMW 3/15, a rebadged version of the Dixi. During the 1930s, BMW expanded its product range to include sports cars and larger luxury vehicles.

During German rearmament, BMW expanded aircraft-engine production and built an assembly and repair plant at Allach between 1936 and 1939. Aircraft engines, motorcycles, and automobiles would be BMW's main products until World War II. During the war, BMW concentrated on building the BMW 801 aircraft engine using as many as 40,000 slave laborers. These consisted primarily of prisoners from Nazi concentration camps, most prominently Dachau. Motorcycles remained as a side-line and automobile manufacture ceased altogether.

Allied bombing damaged BMW's production facilities. At BMW, Allied occupation authorities subsequently dismantled equipment at parts of the Munich works, while other facilities were converted to civilian production. Its remaining West German facilities were banned from producing motor vehicles or aircraft after the war. The company survived by making pots, pans, and bicycles. In 1948, BMW restarted motorcycle production. BMW resumed car production in Bavaria in 1952 with the BMW 501 luxury saloon. The range of cars was expanded in 1955, through the production of the cheaper Isetta microcar under licence. Slow sales of luxury cars and small profit margins from microcars, meant BMW was in serious financial trouble and in 1959 the company was nearly taken over by rival Daimler-Benz.

A large investment in BMW by Herbert Quandt and Harald Quandt resulted in the company surviving as a separate entity. Günther Quandt was a well-known German industrialist and joined the Nazi Party in 1933; he made a fortune arming the Wehrmacht, manufacturing weapons and batteries. Many of his enterprises were appropriated from Jewish owners under duress with minimal compensation. At least three of his enterprises made extensive use of slave laborers, as many as 50,000 in all. One of his battery factories had its own on-site concentration camp, complete with gallows. Life expectancy for laborers was six months. While Quandt and BMW were not directly connected during the war, funds amassed in the Nazi era by his father allowed Herbert Quandt to buy BMW.

The relative success of the small BMW 700 assisted in the company's recovery, allowing them to develop the New Class sedans.

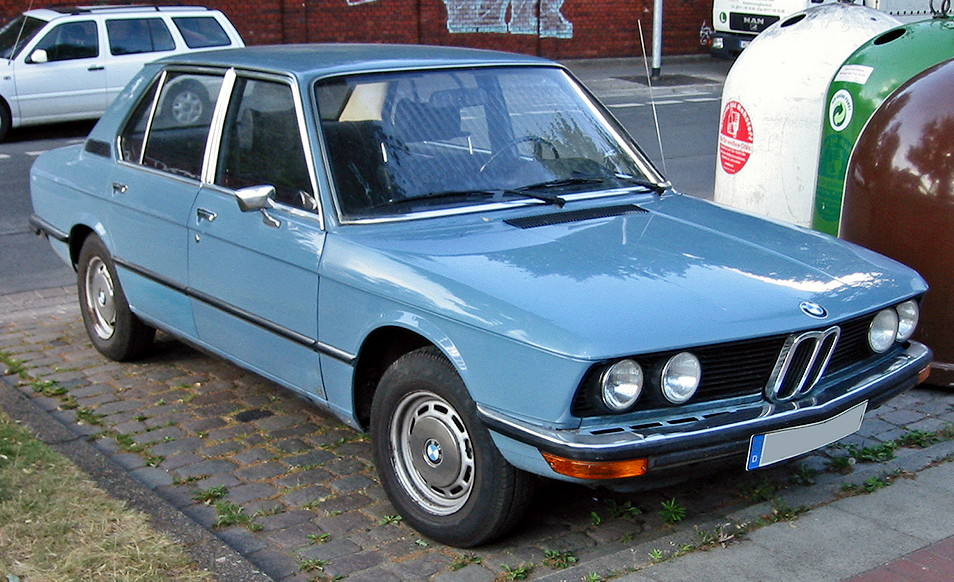
1972 BMW 5 Series (1st generation)

The 1962 introduction of the BMW New Class compact sedans was the beginning of BMW's reputation as a leading manufacturer of sport-oriented cars. Throughout the 1960s, BMW expanded its range by adding coupé and luxury sedan models. The BMW 5 Series mid-size sedan range was introduced in 1972, followed by the BMW 3 Series compact sedans in 1975, the BMW 6 Series luxury coupés in 1976 and the BMW 7 Series large luxury sedans in 1978.

The BMW M division released its first road car, the M1, a mid-engine supercar, in 1978. This was followed by the BMW M5 in 1984 and the BMW M3 in 1986. Also in 1986, BMW introduced its first V12 engine in the 750i luxury sedan. The 1989 BMW Z1 marked BMW's return to making a two-seat roadster, the 1995 BMW Z3 was their first mass-production two-seat roadster, and the 1999 BMW X5 was the company's first entry into the SUV market.

The company purchased the Rover Group in 1994, but the takeover was not successful and caused BMW large financial losses. In 2000, BMW sold off most of the Rover brands, retaining only the Mini brand. In 1998, BMW also acquired the rights to the Rolls-Royce brand from Vickers.

=== 21st century ===
BMW's first modern mass-produced turbocharged petrol engine was introduced in 2006 (from 1973 to 1975, BMW built 1,672 units of a turbocharged BMW M10 engine for the BMW 02 Series), with most engines switching over to turbocharging over the 2010s. The first hybrid BMW was the 2010 BMW ActiveHybrid 7, and BMW's first mass-production electric car was the BMW i3 city car, which was released in 2013, (from 1968 to 1972, BMW built two battery-electric BMW 1602 Elektro saloons for the 1972 Olympic Games). After many years of establishing a reputation for sporting rear-wheel drive cars, BMW's first front-wheel drive car was the 2014 BMW 2 Series Active Tourer multi-purpose vehicle (MPV).

In March 2018, Daimler and BMW merged their mobility services. In August 2019, Oliver Zipse replaced Harald Krüger as the head of the BMW Group. In May 2026, Milan Nedeljković succeeded Zipse as chairman of the board of management of BMW AG.

In January 2021, BMW announced that its sales in 2020 fell by 8.4 percent due to the impact of COVID-19 pandemic restrictions. However, in the fourth quarter of 2020, BMW witnessed a rise of 3.2% in its customers' demands. This recovery was supported by the company's adoption of widely accepted technologies and integration of third-party services such as Apple Pay and on-demand music as well as key partnerships such as its collaboration with Daimler on autonomous driving. Additionally, BMW's strategic investment decisions which include localizing production of its SUVs to the Spartanburg plant in the U.S., placed the group in a position to easily navigate trade challenges and shifting consumer patterns.

On 18 January 2022 BMW announced a BMW 7 Series (G11) special edition simply called "The Final V12", the last BMW series production vehicle to be fitted with a V-12 engine.

On 5 October 2023 it was announced that BMW UK CEO Chris Brownridge would succeed Torsten Müller-Ötvös as the CEO of Rolls-Royce starting 1 December 2023, as a result of Müller-Ötvös retiring.

In January 2025, BMW announced the launch of a closed-loop recycling system for the reuse of raw materials from high-voltage batteries used in its range of electric vehicles. In November 2024, BMW launched a partnership in Europe with SK tes, a provider of solutions to recover cobalt, nickel and lithium from used batteries for use in making new batteries. In September 2025, BMW jointly developed an automated driving system with Qualcomm. The system will debut on the BMW iX3.

In January 2026, the company was reported to be among the top 30 global investors in research and development (R&D) in 2025.

== Branding ==
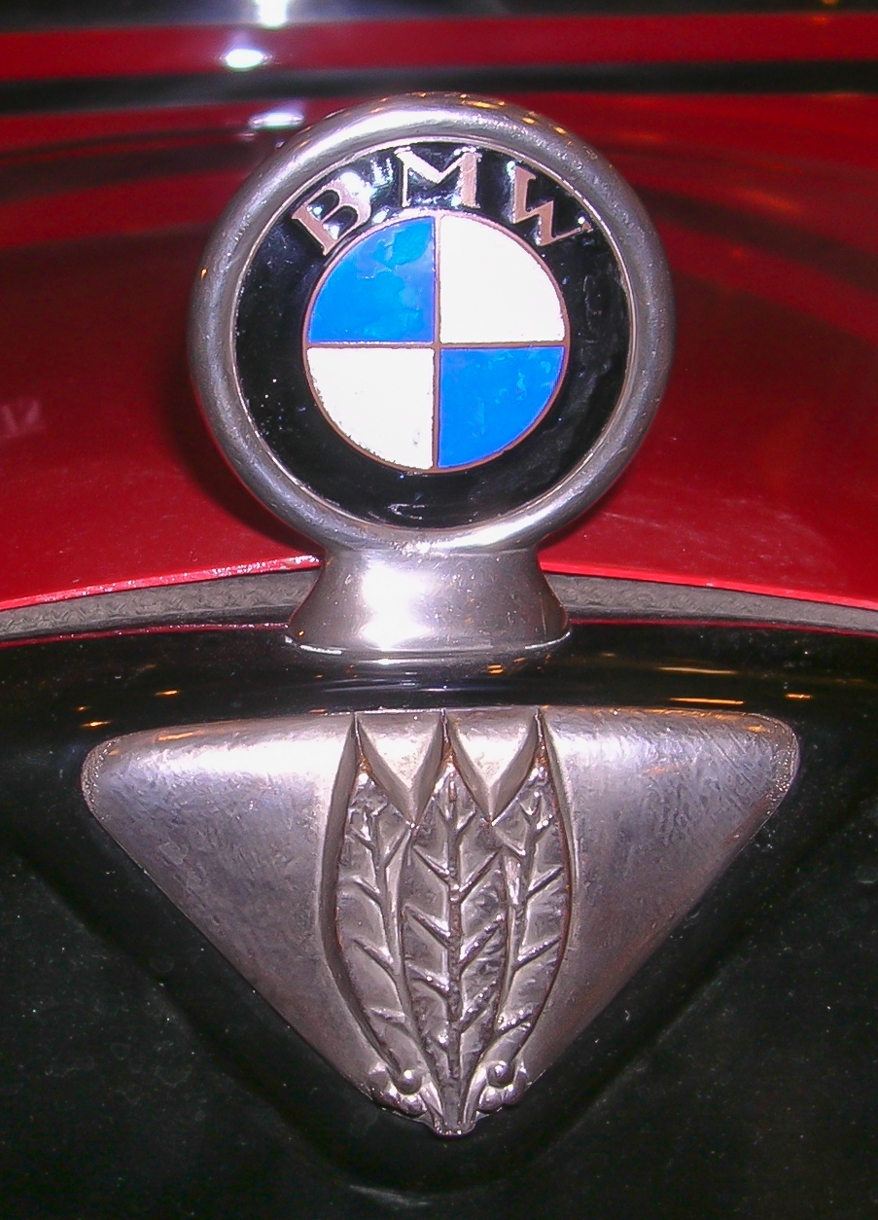
BMW badge on a 1931 Dixi

Flag of Bavaria

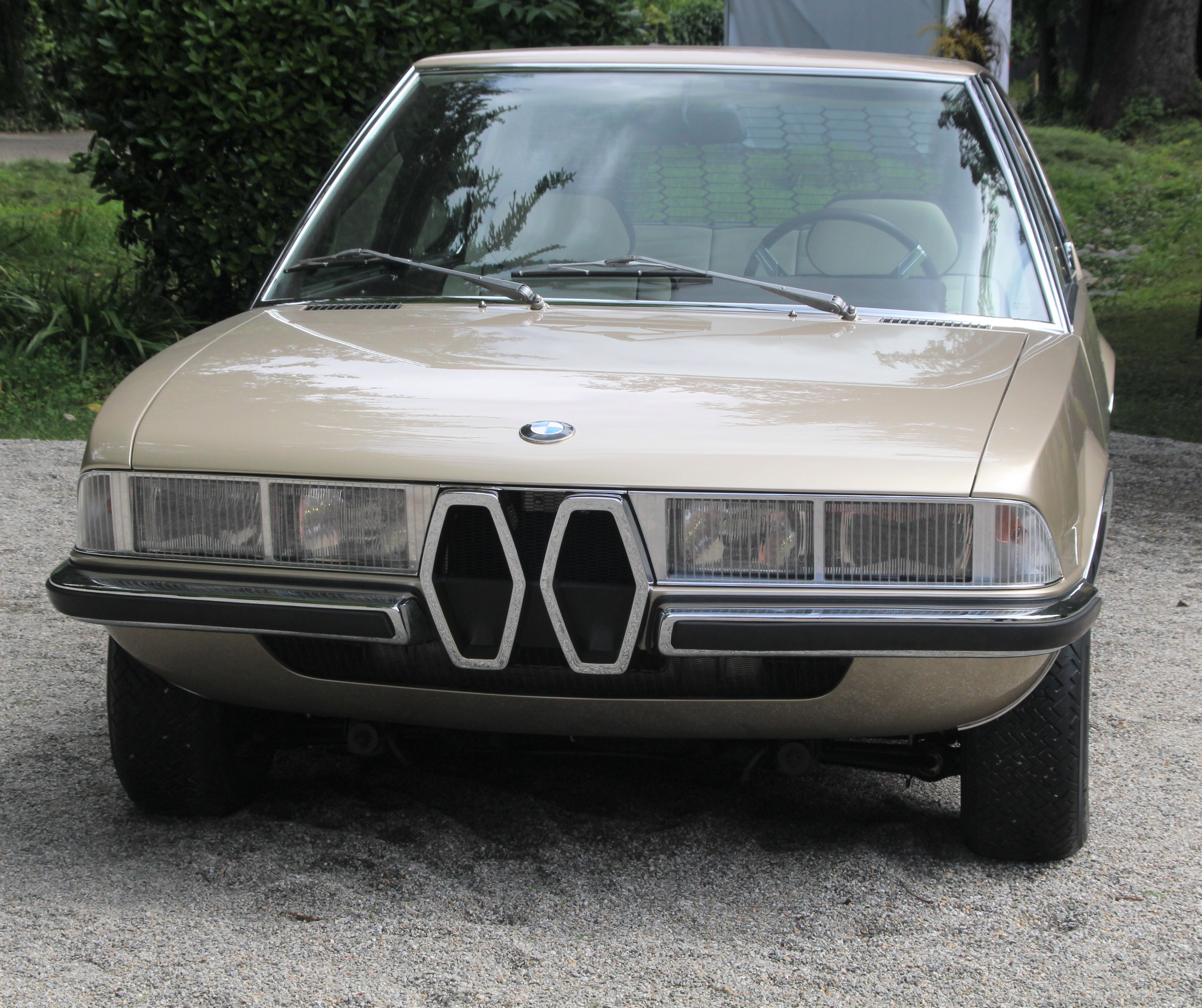
1970 Garmisch concept

=== Company name ===
BMW is an abbreviation for Bayerische Motoren Werke. This name is grammatically incorrect (in German, compound words must not contain spaces), which is why the grammatically correct form of the name, Bayerische Motorenwerke (German pronunciation: [ˈbaɪʁɪʃə moˈtoːʁənˌvɛʁkə]) has been used in several publications and advertisements in the past. Bayerische Motorenwerke translates into English as Bavarian Motor Works. The suffix AG, short for Aktiengesellschaft, signifies an incorporated entity owned by shareholders, akin to Inc., "Incorporated" (US) or PLC, "Public Limited Company" (UK).

The terms Beemer, Bimmer and Bee-em are sometimes used as slang for BMW in the English language and are sometimes used interchangeably for cars and motorcycles.

=== Logo ===
The circular blue and white BMW logo or roundel evolved from the circular Rapp Motorenwerke company logo, which featured a black ring bearing the company name surrounding the company logo, an image of a horse head on a plinth. BMW retained Rapp's black ring inscribed with the company name, but the interior of the ring is quartered blue and white, reminiscent of the coat of arms and flag of Bavaria (which in turn are based on the arms of the historic House of Wittelsbach, which ruled Bavaria for many centuries). The logo does not bear the distinctive lozenge shape found on the coat of arms, however, as local laws at the time it was introduced forbade the use of state coats of arms on commercial logos.

A persistent myth claims that the logo is based on the image of an airplane propeller spinning in a blue sky. This myth likely stems from a 1929 BMW advertisement that depicted the logo superimposed on a rotating propeller. However, the logo predates that advertisement by 12 years.

The current iteration of the logo was introduced in 2020, removing 3D effects that had been used in previous renderings of the logo while removing the black outline encircling the roundel. The logo is used for BMW's branding communications but it is not used on vehicles.

Logo used in vehicles since 1997

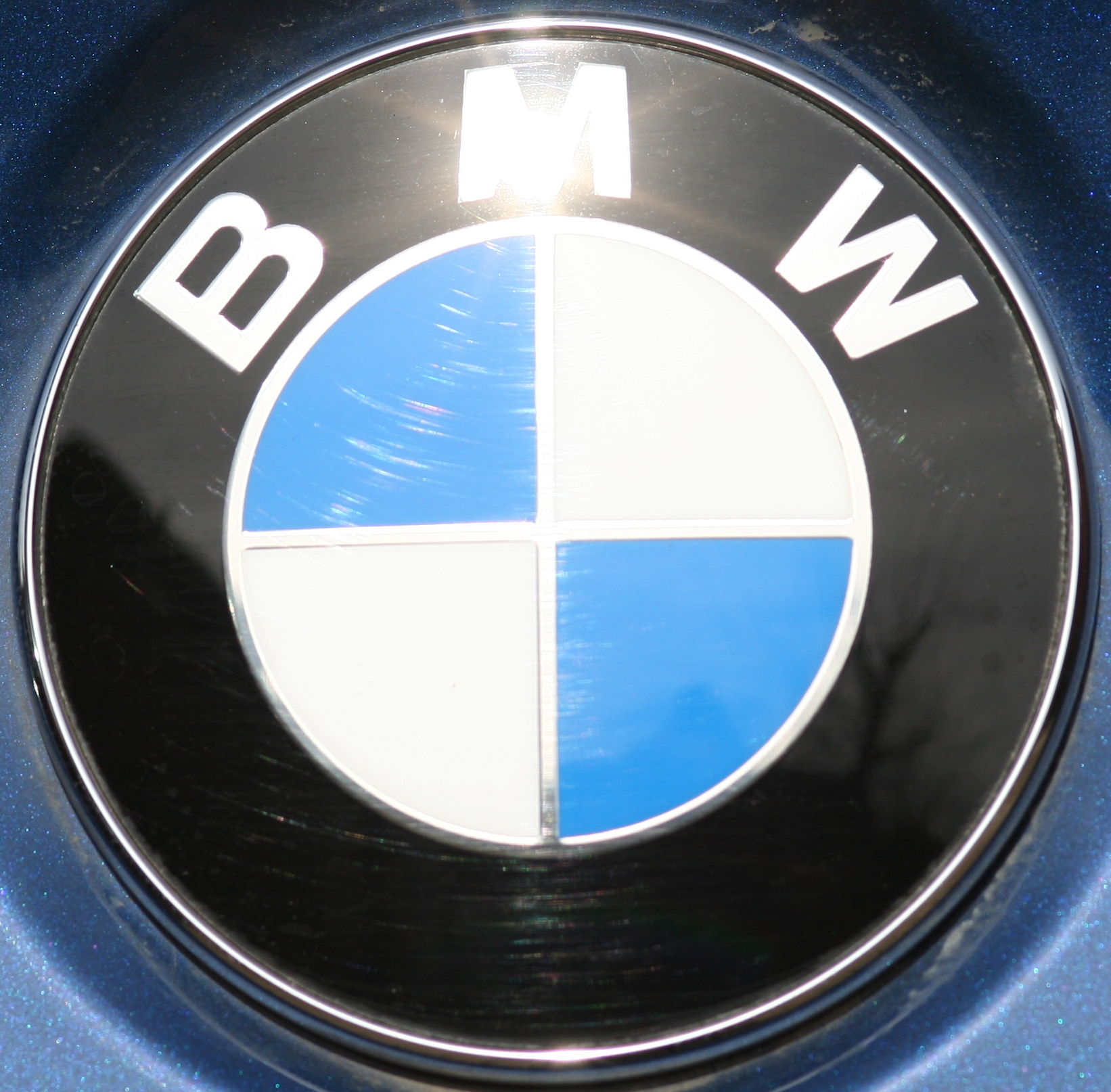
The logo on a BMW car

Logo used for publicity purposes since March 2020

=== Slogan ===
The slogan 'Freude am Fahren' (English: 'Sheer Driving Pleasure') has been used by BMW in most markets worldwide since 1972, when it was standardized as the company's official slogan and its English translation set for export markets. The slogan first appeared as 'Aus Freude am Fahren' in 1965 before the opening word was dropped in 1972. In the United States and United Kingdom, BMW instead uses 'The Ultimate Driving Machine'.

The slogan 'The Ultimate Driving Machine' was coined by BMW North America in 1974, and first used in ads celebrating its win at the 1975 12 Hours of Sebring. In 2010, this long-lived campaign was mostly supplanted by a campaign intended to make the brand more approachable and to better appeal to women, 'Joy'. By 2012 BMW had returned to 'The Ultimate Driving Machine'.

=== Marks ===
In 2023, the World Intellectual Property Organization (WIPO)’s Madrid Yearly Review ranked BMW's number of marks applications filled under the Madrid System as 2nd in the world, with 124 trademarks applications submitted during 2023.

== Leadership ==
- Franz Josef Popp (1922–1942)
- Fritz Hille (1942–1945)
- Hanns Grewenig (1947–1952)
- Heinrich Richter Bronhm (1957–1960)
- Herbert Quandt (1960–1970)
- Eberhard von Kuenheim (1970–1993)
- Bernd Pischetsrieder (1993–1999)
- Joachim Milberg (1999–2002)
- Helmut Panke (2002–2006)
- Norbert Reithofer (2006–2015)
- Harald Krüger (2015–2019)
- Oliver Zipse (2019–2026)
- Milan Nedeljković (2026–present)

== Corporate affairs ==
Sales by region (2024)
Region	share
Rest of Europe	30.8%
United States	20.2%
China	18.5%
Germany	13.9%
Rest of Asia	10.3%
Rest of Americas	3.8%
Rest of the World	2.4%

Sales by business unit (2024)
Region	share
Automotive	73.3%
Financial services	24.7%
Motorcycles	2.0%

The key trends of the BMW Group are (as at the financial year ending 31 December):

Year	Revenue (€ bn)	Net income (€ bn)	Total assets (€ bn)	Number of sold cars (m)	Employees (k)
2007	56.0	3.1	88.9	1.5	107
2008	53.1	0.32	101	1.4	100
2009	50.6	0.20	101	1.2	96.2
2010	60.4	3.2	108	1.4	95.4
2011	68.8	4.8	123	1.6	100
2012	76.8	5.0	131	1.8	105
2013	76.0	5.3	138	1.9	110
2014	80.4	5.7	154	2.1	116
2015	92.1	6.3	172	2.2	122
2016	94.1	6.8	188	2.3	124
2017	98.6	8.6	193	2.4	129
2018	97.4	7.1	208	2.4	134
2019	104	4.9	241	2.5	133
2020	98.9	3.7	216	2.3	120
2021	111	12.3	229	2.5	118
2022	142	17.9	246	2.3	146
2023	155	11.2	250	2.5	152
2024	142	7.3	268	2.5	157
2025	133	7.3	266	2.5	155

== Motorcycles ==
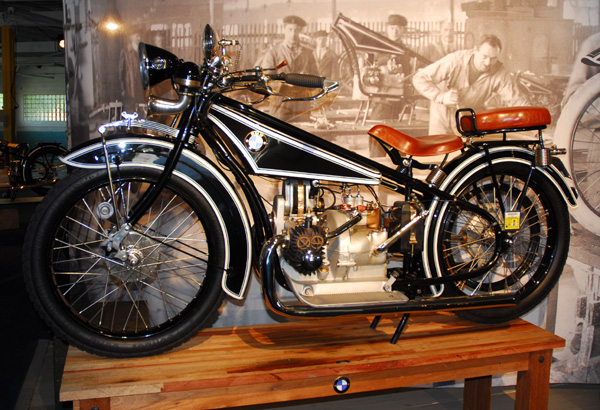
The R32 motorcycle, the first BMW motor vehicle, at the BMW Museum in Munich

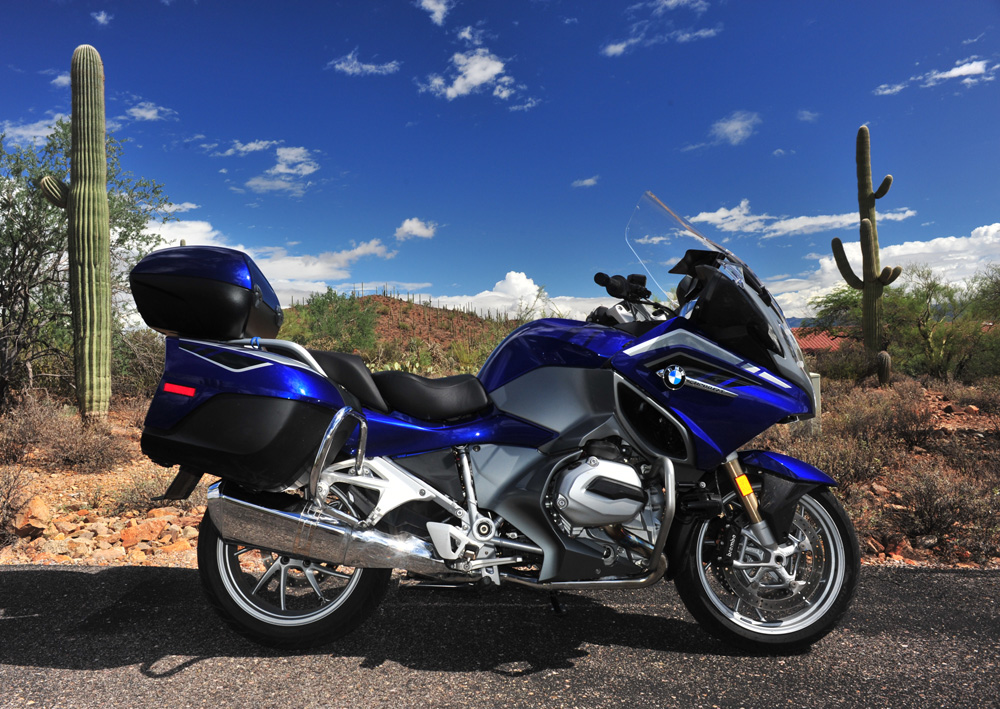
The 2015 BMW R1200RT

BMW began production of motorcycle engines and then motorcycles after World War I. Its motorcycle brand is now known as BMW Motorrad. Their first successful motorcycle after the failed Helios and Flink, was the "R32" in 1923, though production originally began in 1921. This had a "boxer" twin engine, in which a cylinder projects into the air-flow from each side of the machine. Apart from its single-cylinder models (basically to the same pattern), all its motorcycles used this distinctive layout until the early 1980s. Many BMW's are still produced in this layout, which is designated the R Series.

The entire BMW Motorcycle production line has, since 1969, been located at the company's Berlin-Spandau factory. During the Second World War, BMW produced the BMW R75 motorcycle with a motor-driven sidecar attached. Combined with a lockable differential, the vehicle was very capable off-road.

In 1982 came the K Series, with a shaft drive but water-cooled and with either three or four cylinders mounted in a straight line from front to back. Shortly after, BMW also started making the chain-driven F and G series with single and parallel twin Rotax engines.

In the early 1990s, BMW updated the airhead Boxer engine which became known as the oilhead. In 2002, the oilhead engine had two spark plugs per cylinder. In 2004 it added a built-in balance shaft, an increased capacity to 1,170 cc (71 cu in) and enhanced performance to 75 kW (101 hp) for the R1200GS, compared to 63 kW (84 hp) of the previous R1150GS. More powerful variants of the oilhead engines are available in the R1100S and R1200S, producing 73 and 91 kW (98 and 122 hp), respectively.

In 2004, BMW introduced the new K1200S Sports Bike which marked a departure for BMW. It had an engine producing 125 kW (168 hp), derived from the company's work with the Williams F1 team, and is lighter than previous K models. Innovations include electronically adjustable front and rear suspension, and a Hossack-type front fork that BMW calls Duolever.

BMW introduced anti-lock brakes on production motorcycles starting in the late 1980s. The generation of anti-lock brakes available on the 2006 and later BMW motorcycles paved the way for the introduction of electronic stability control, or anti-skid technology later in the 2007 model year.

BMW has been an innovator in motorcycle suspension design, taking up telescopic front suspension long before most other manufacturers. Then it switched to an Earles fork, front suspension by swinging fork (1955 to 1969). Most modern BMWs are truly rear swingarm, single sided at the back (compare with the regular swinging fork usually, and wrongly, called swinging arm). Some BMWs started using yet another trademark front suspension design, the Telelever, in the early 1990s. Like the Earles fork, the Telelever significantly reduces dive under braking.

BMW Group, on 31 January 2013, announced that Pierer Industrie AG has bought Husqvarna Motorcycles for an undisclosed amount, which will not be revealed by either party in the future. The company is headed by Stephan Pierer (CEO of KTM). Pierer Industrie AG is 51% owner of KTM and 100% owner of Husqvarna.

In September 2018, BMW unveiled a new self-driving motorcycle with BMW Motorrad with a goal of using the technology to help improve road safety. The design of the bike was inspired by the company's BMW R1200 GS model.

== Automobiles ==
=== Current models ===
The current model lines of BMW cars are:

- 1 Series five-door hatchbacks (model code F70).
- 2 Series two-door coupes (model code G42), "Active Tourer" five-seat MPVs (U06), four-door "Gran Coupe" sedans (model code F74) and long-wheelbase model exclusive to China (F78).
- 3 Series four-door sedans (model code G20), five-door station wagons (G21) and long-wheelbase model exclusive to China (G28).
- 4 Series two-door coupes (model code G22), two-door convertibles (model code G23) and five-door "Gran Coupe" fastbacks (model code G26).
- 5 Series four-door sedans (model code G60), five-door station wagons (G61) and long-wheelbase model exclusive to China (G68).
- 7 Series four-door sedans (model code G70).
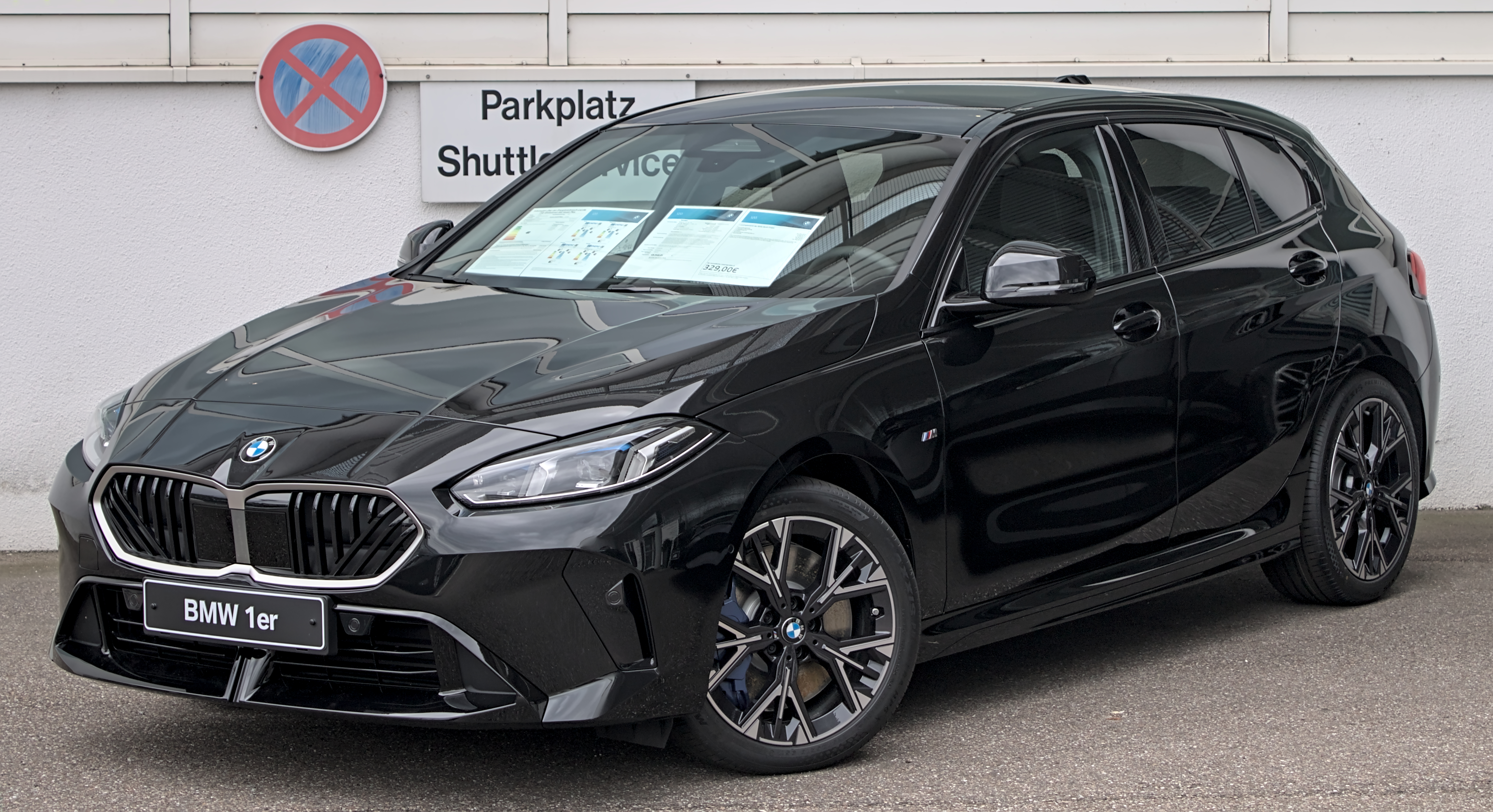
1 Series (F70)

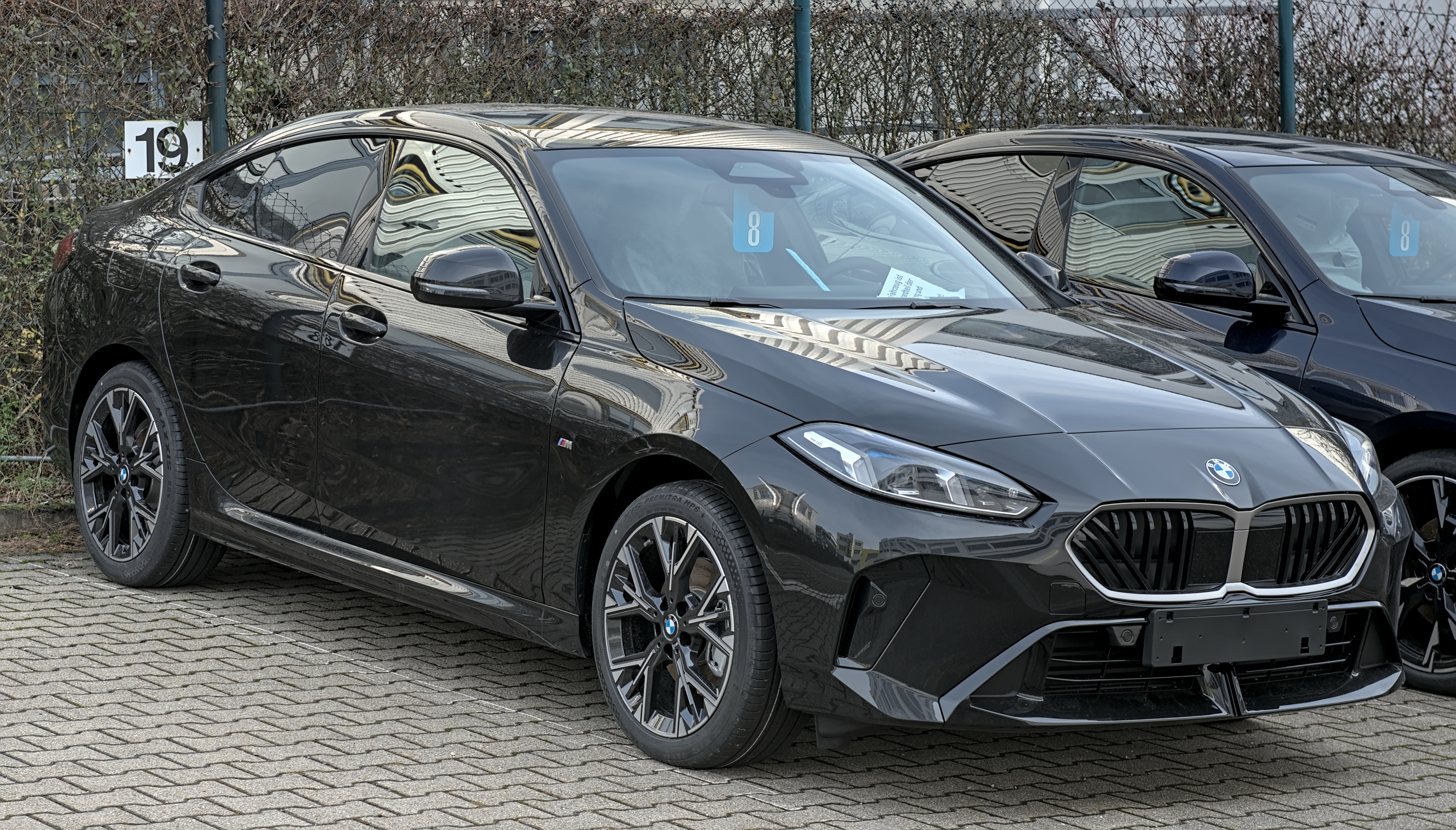
2 Series Gran Coupé (F74)

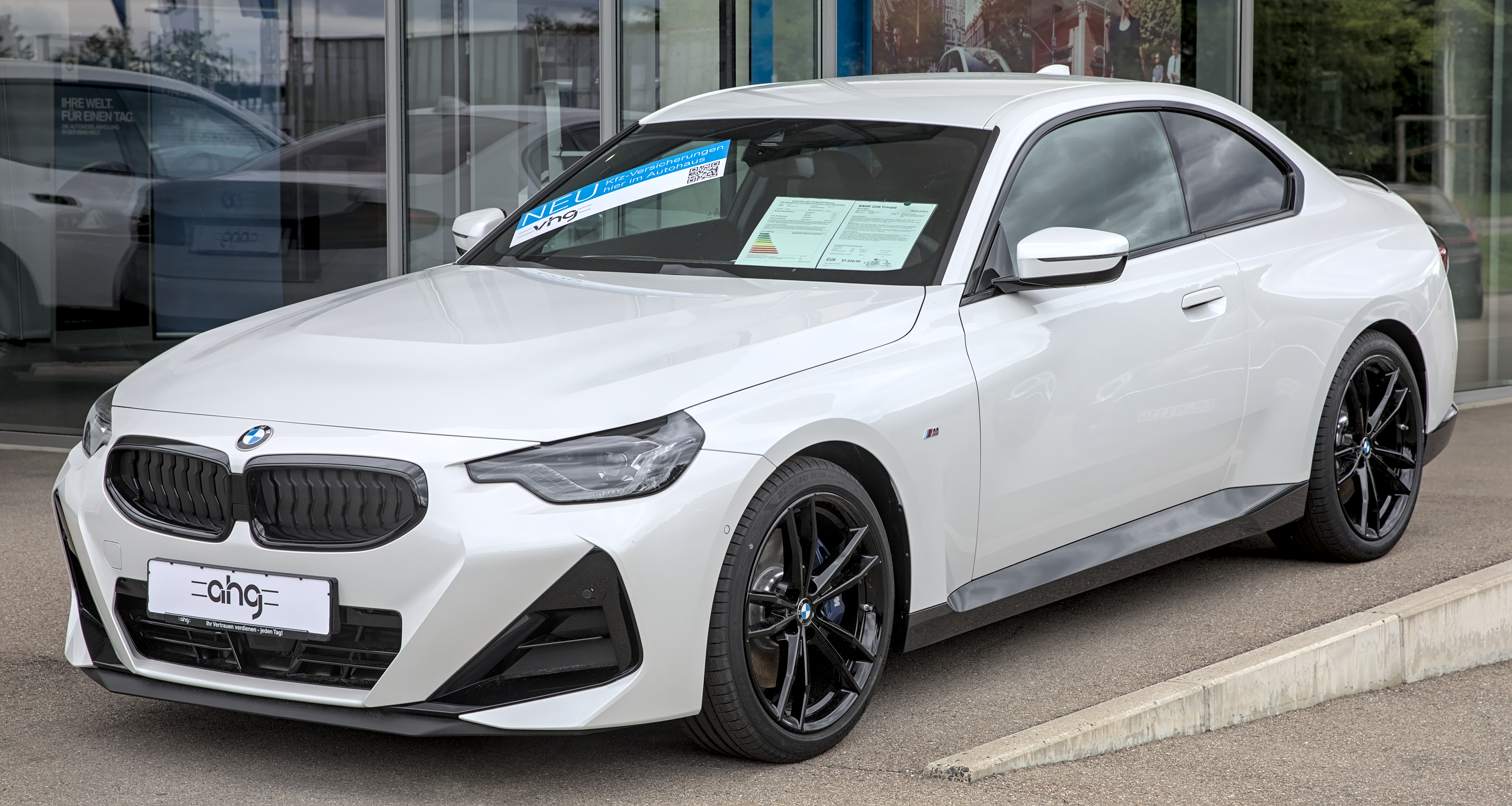
2 Series (G42)

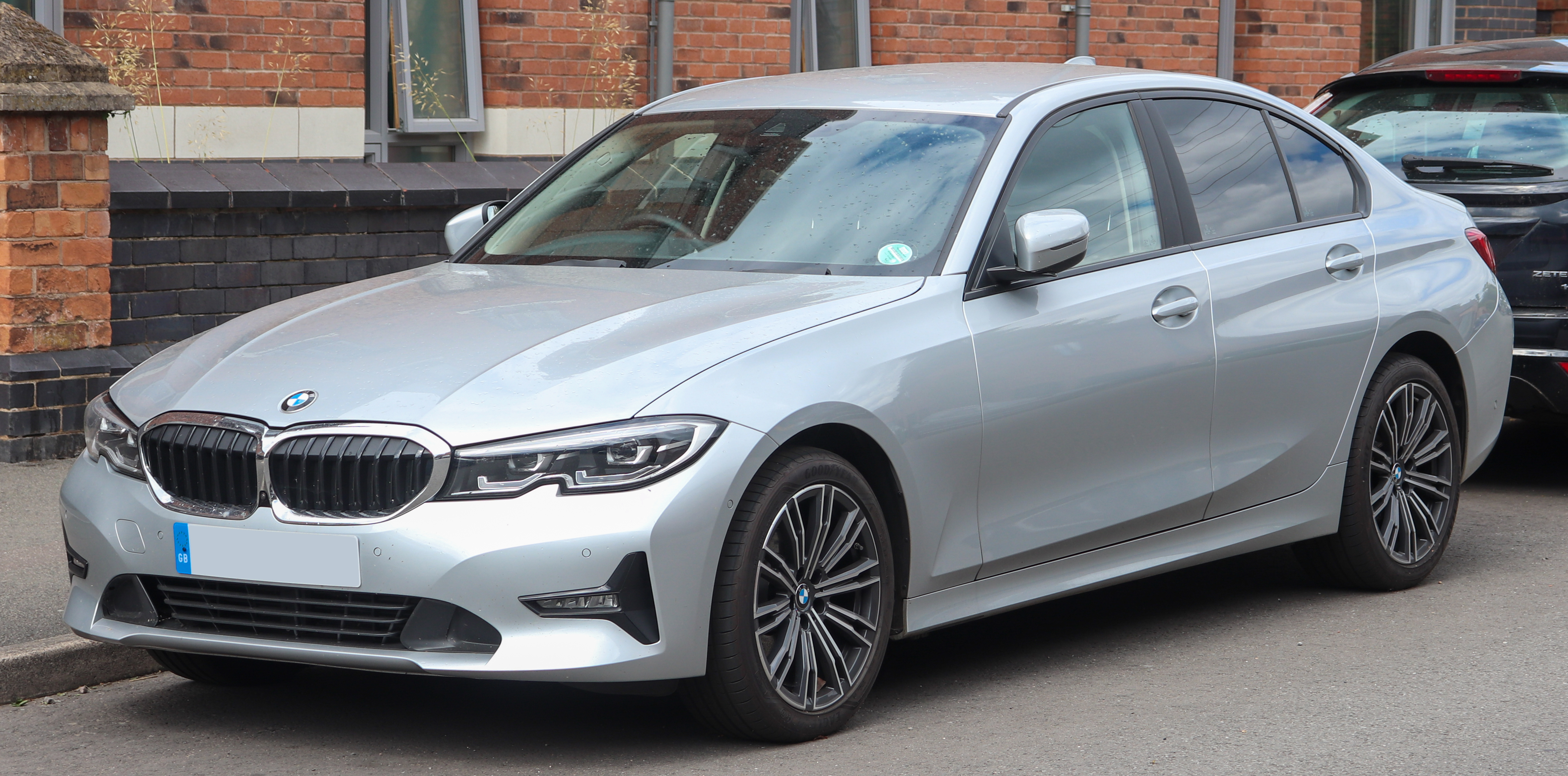
3 Series (G20)

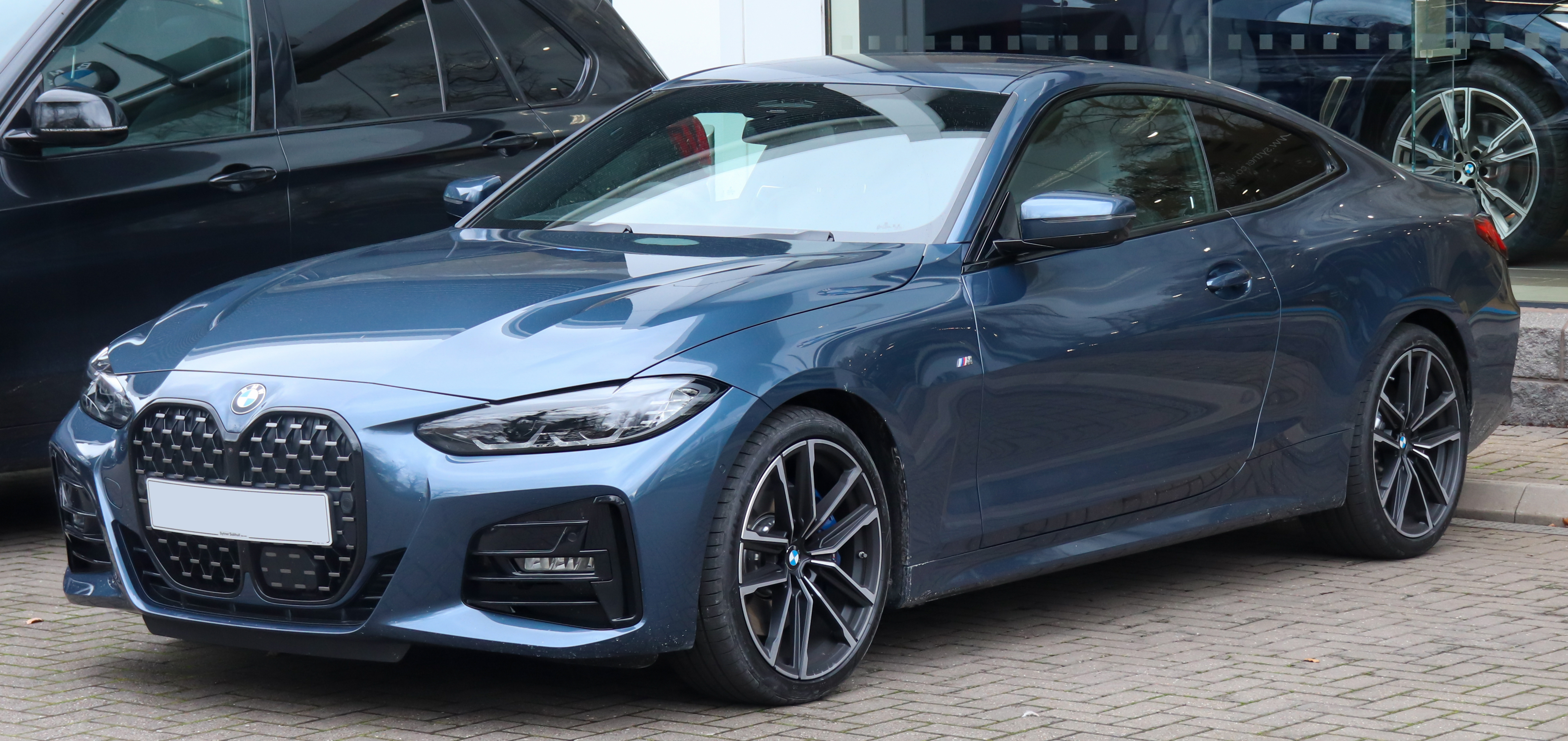
4 Series (G22)

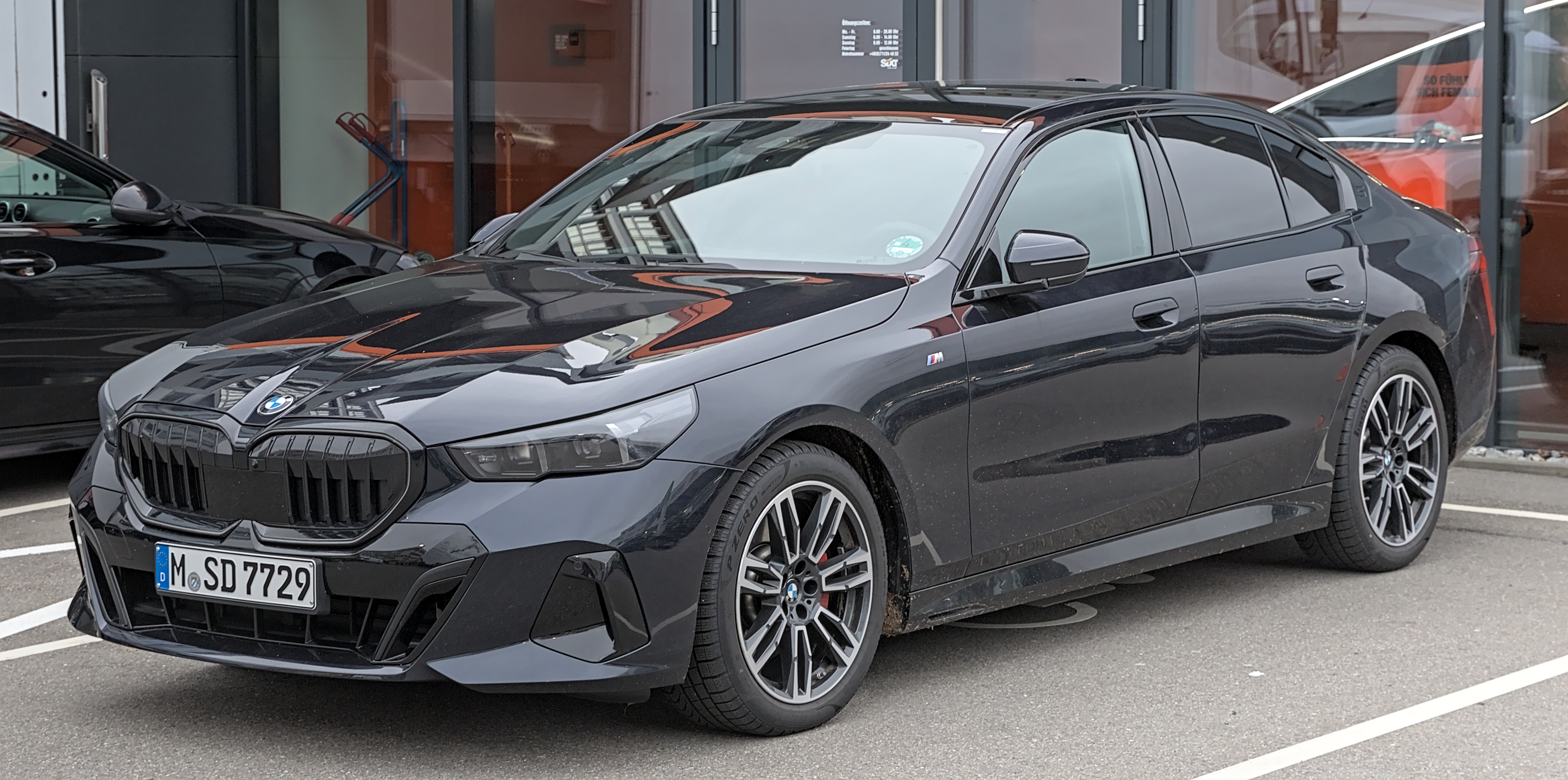
5 Series (G60)

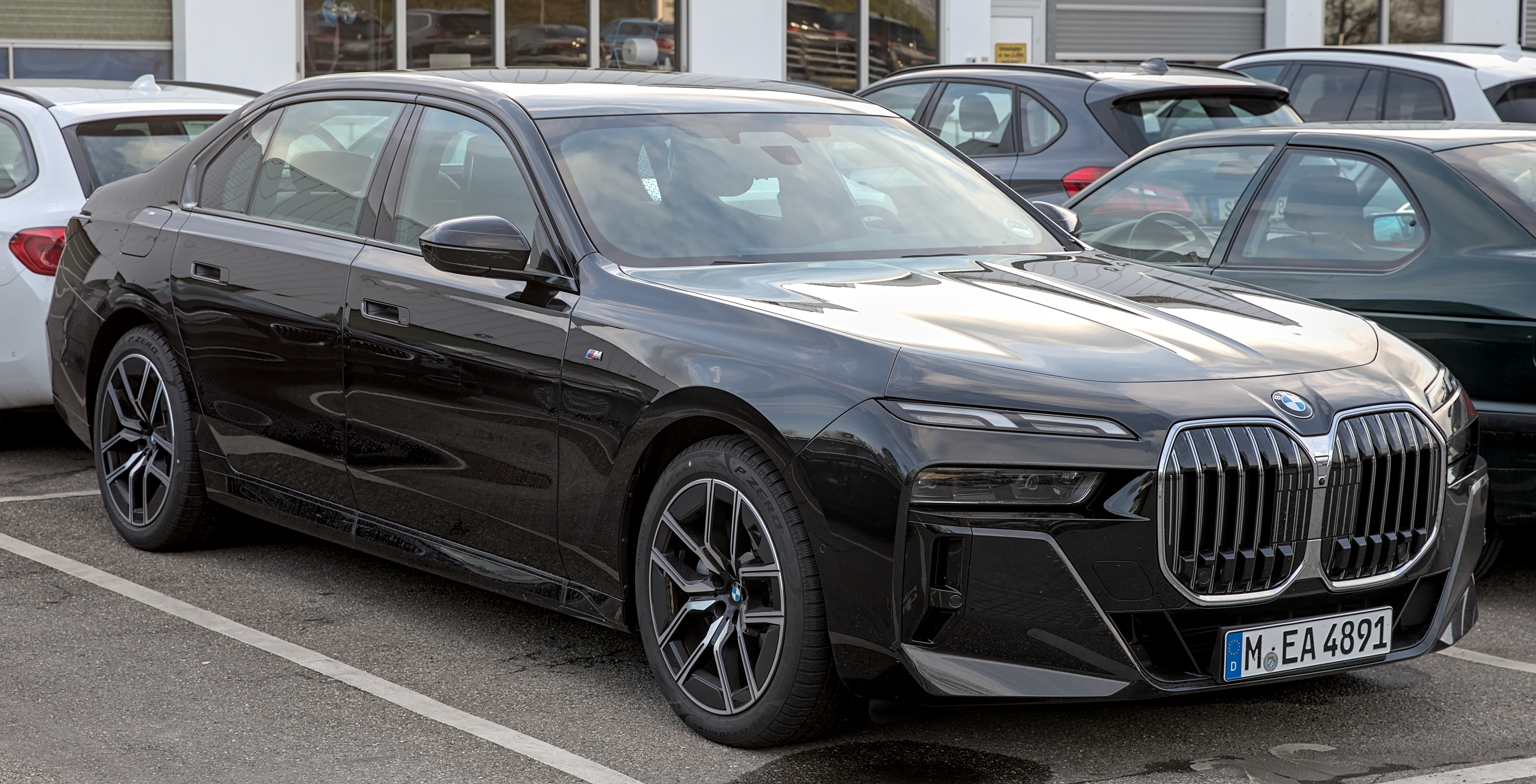
7 Series (G70)

The current model lines of the X Series SUVs and crossovers are:

- X1 (U11)
- X2 (U10)
- X3 (G45)
- X5 (G65)
- X6 (G06)
- X7 (G07)
- XM (G09)
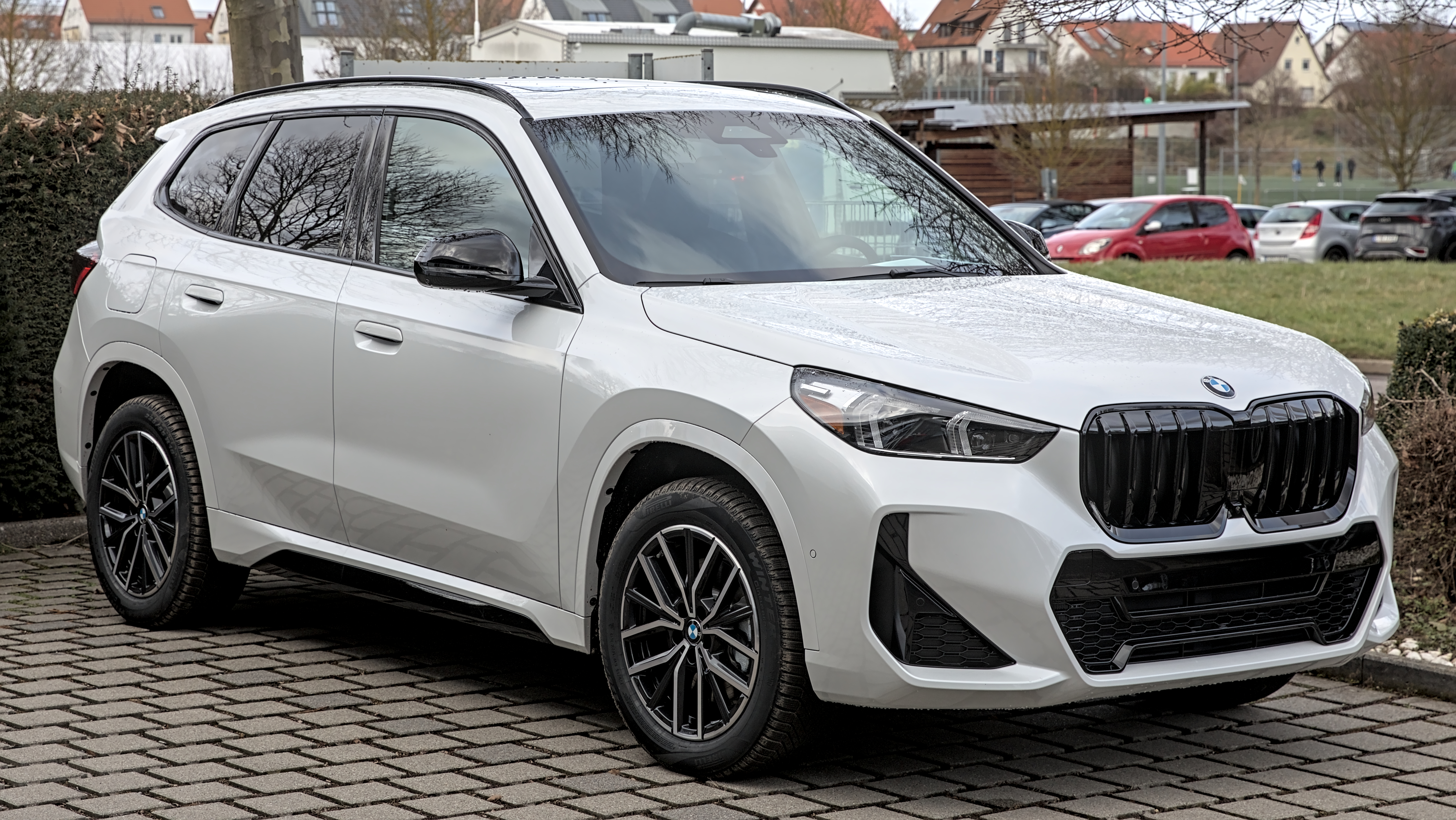
X1 (U11)

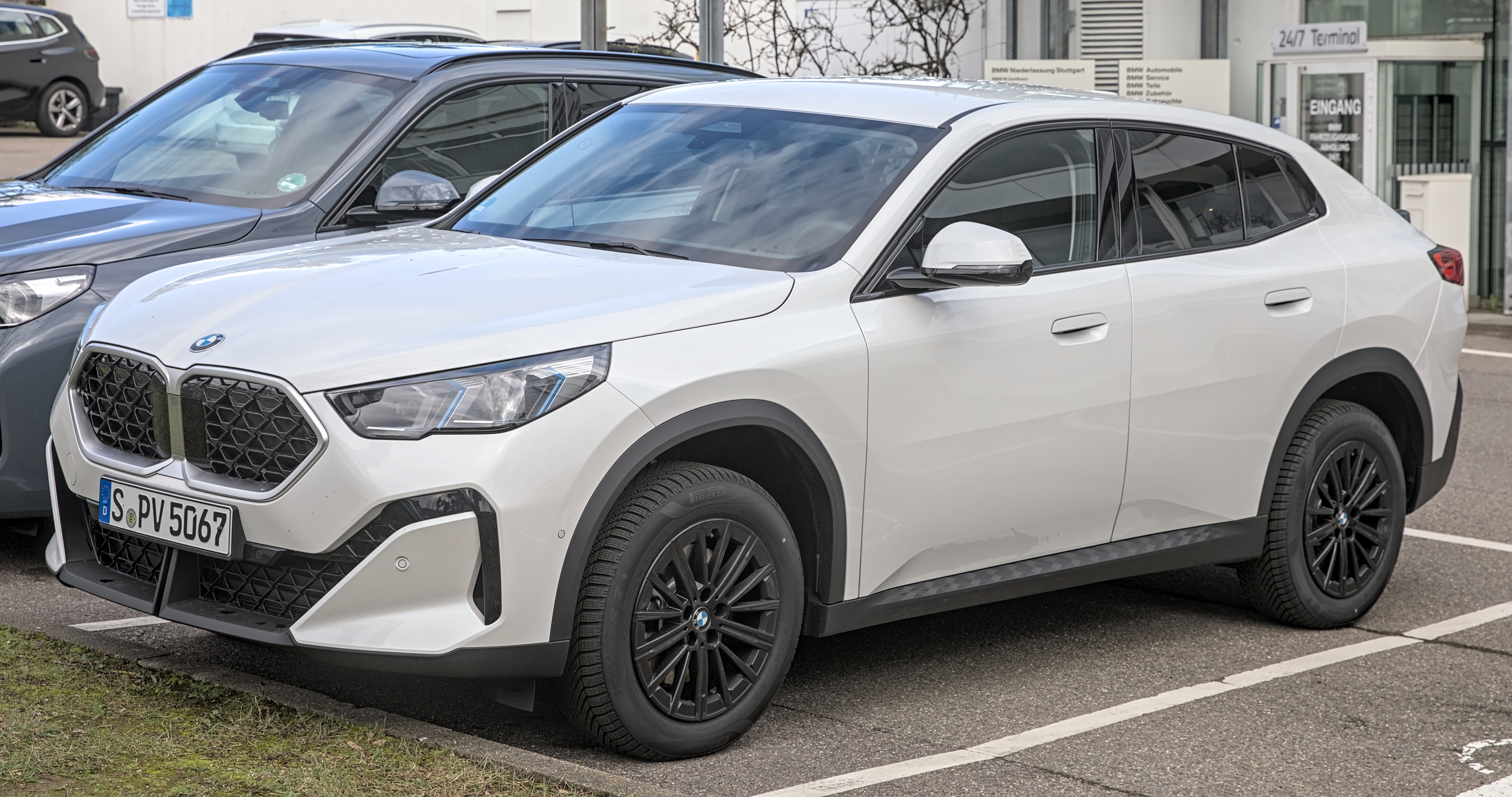
X2 (U10)

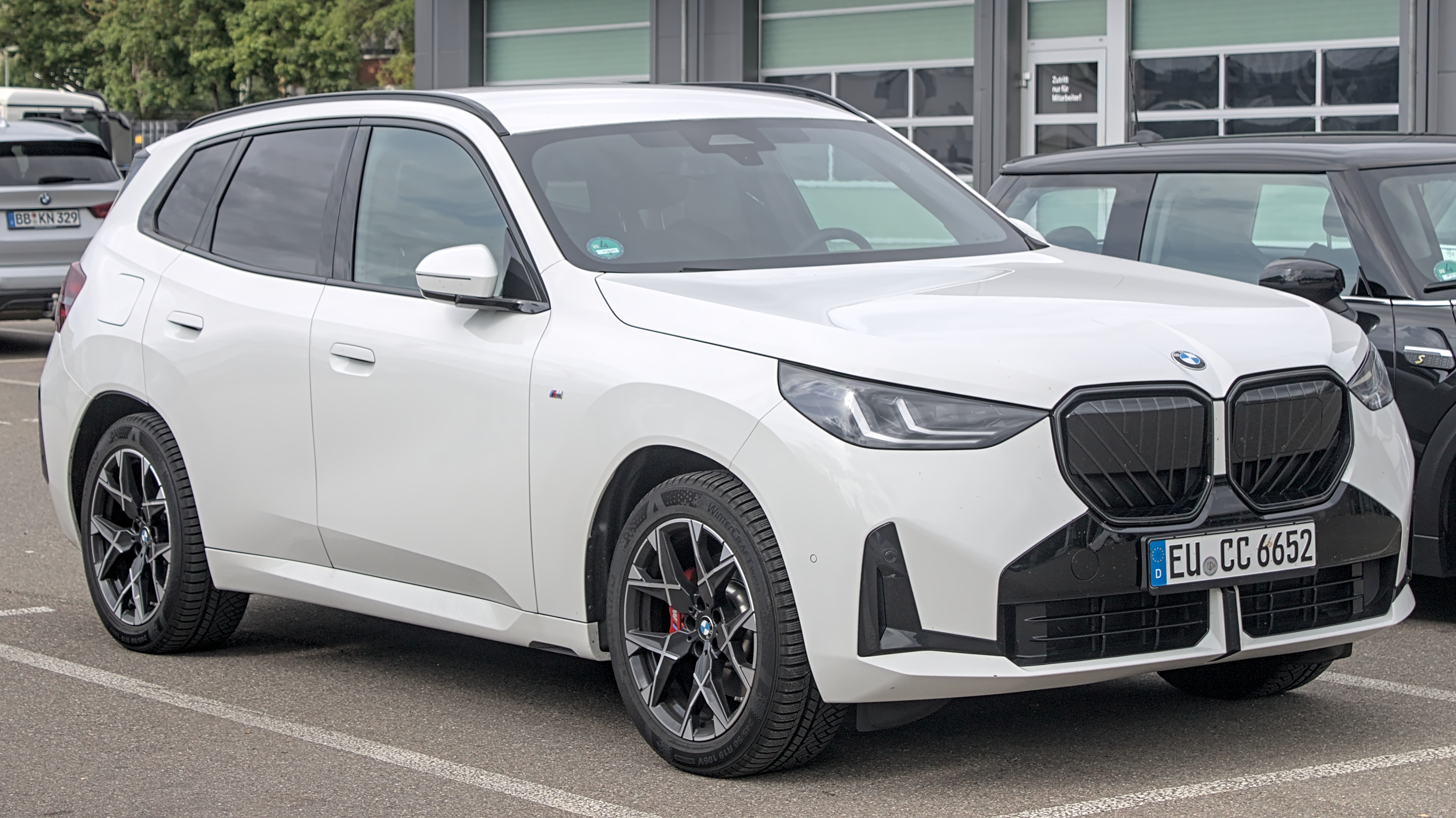
X3 (G45)

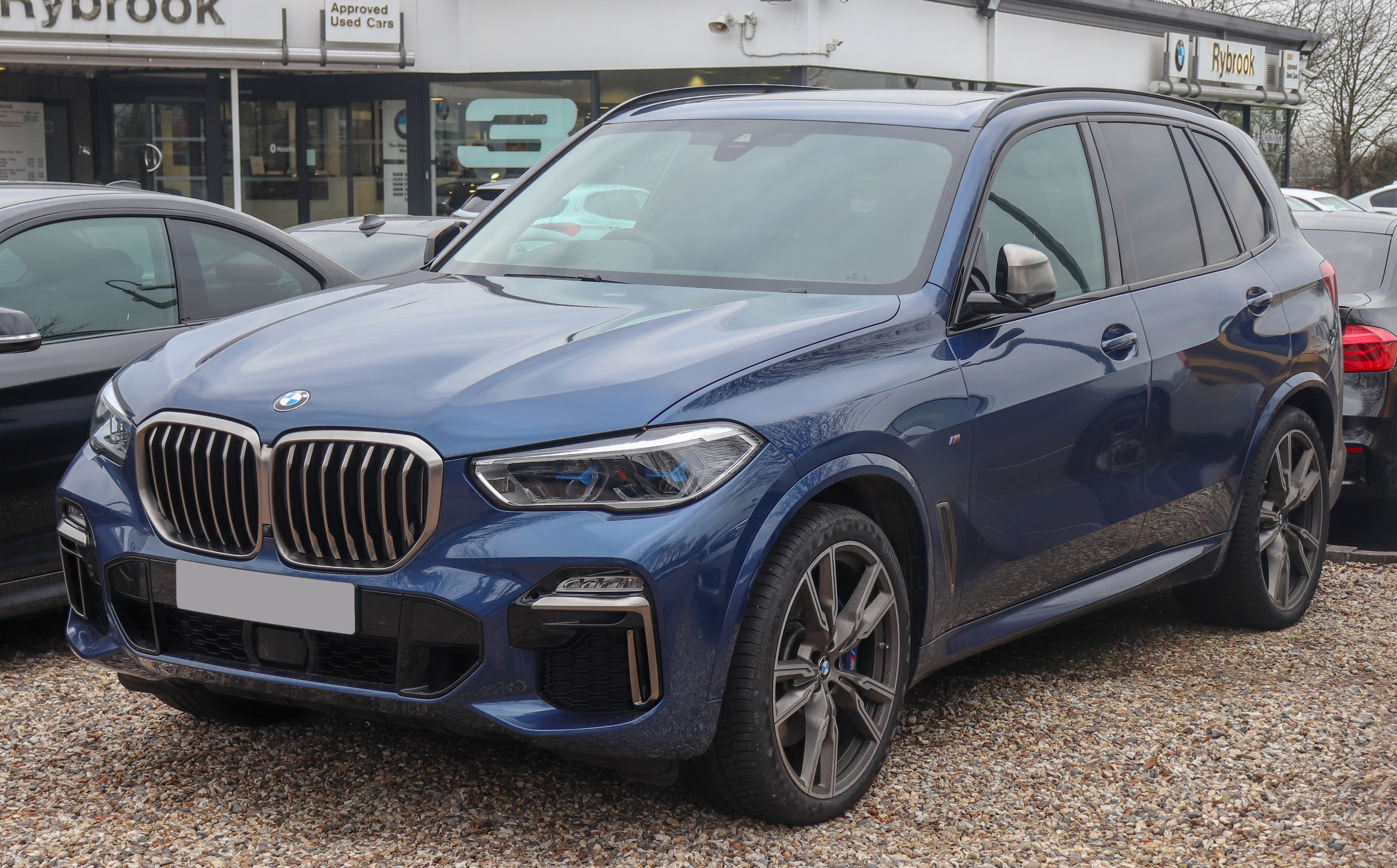
X5 (G65)

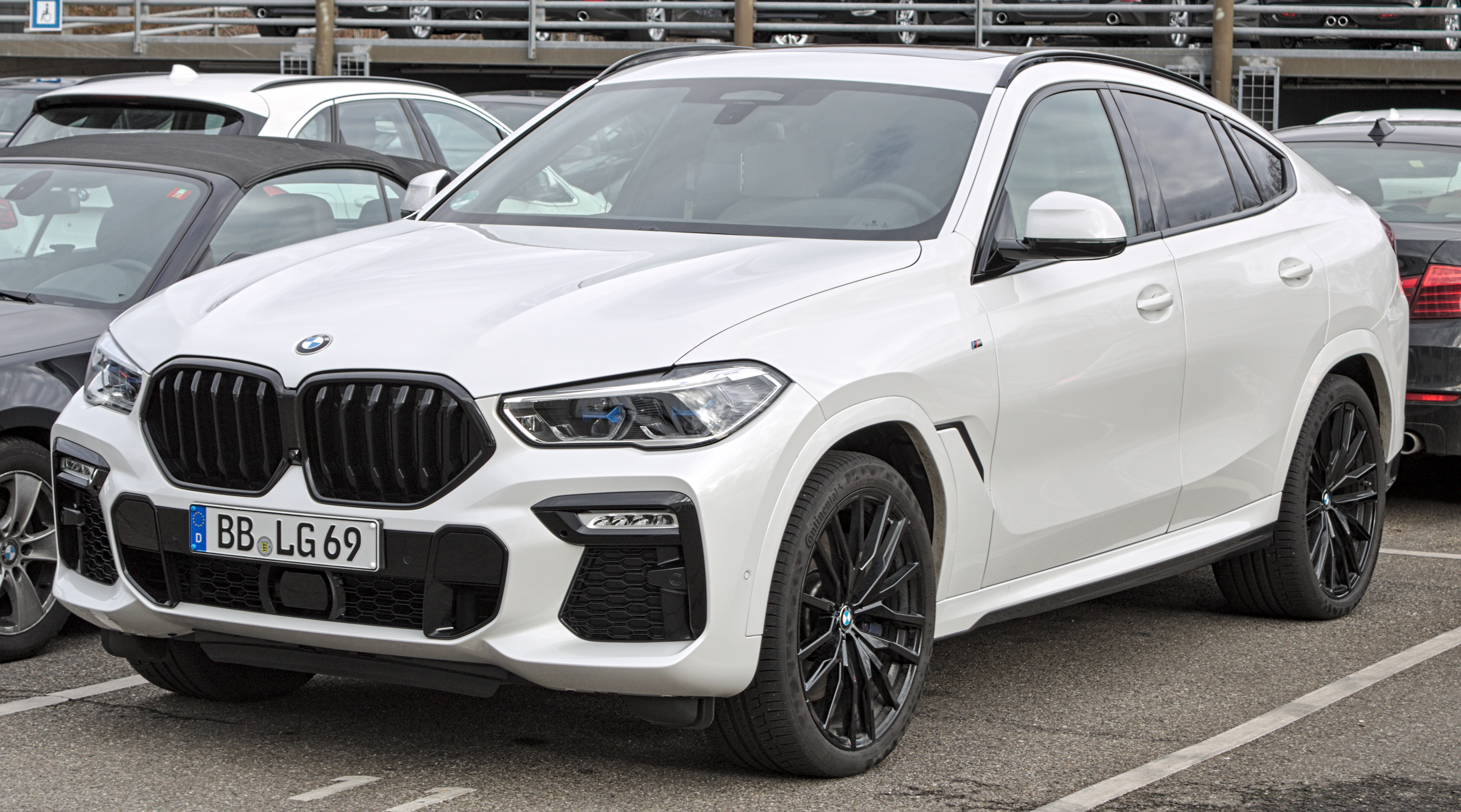
X6 (G06)

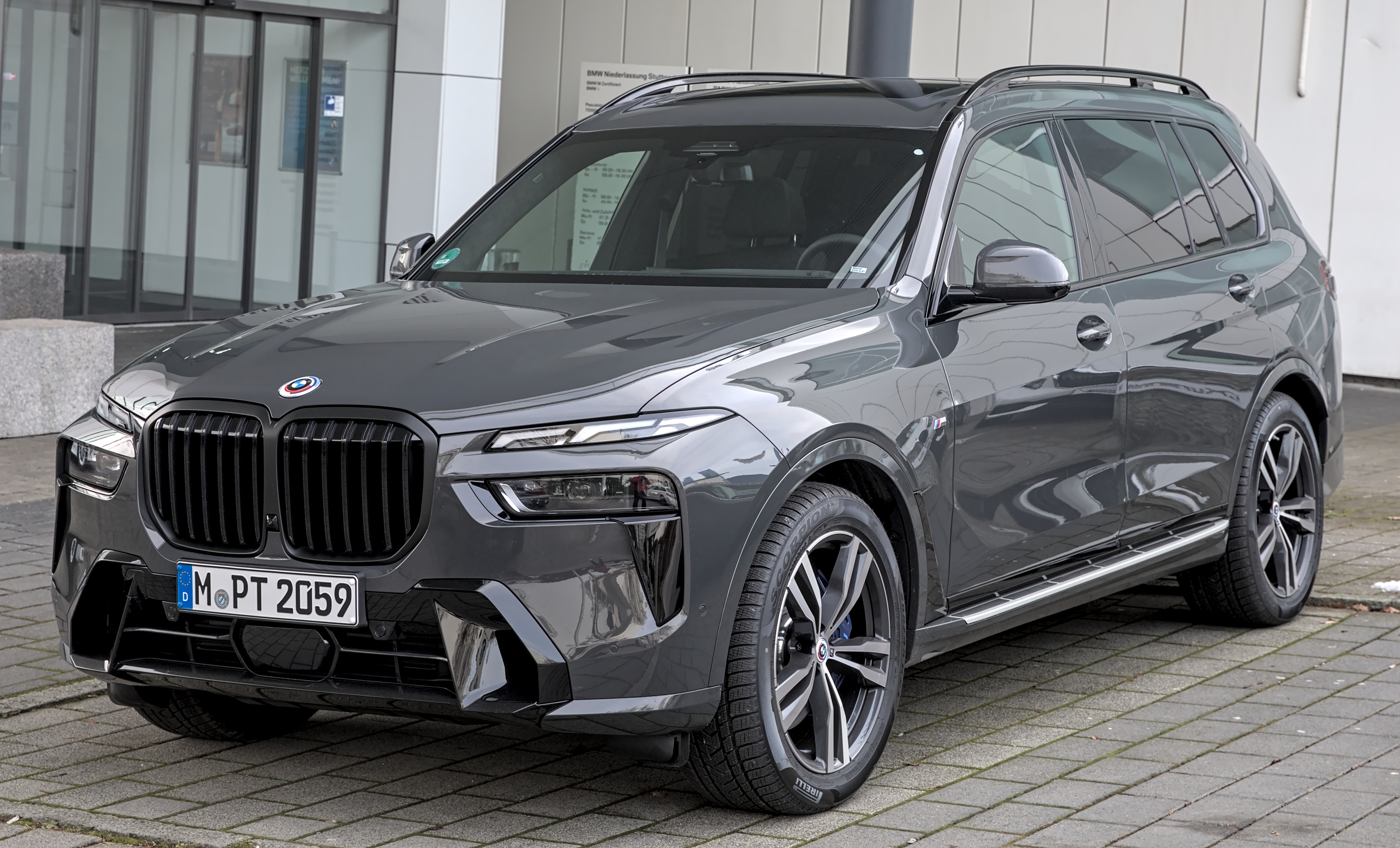
X7 (G07)

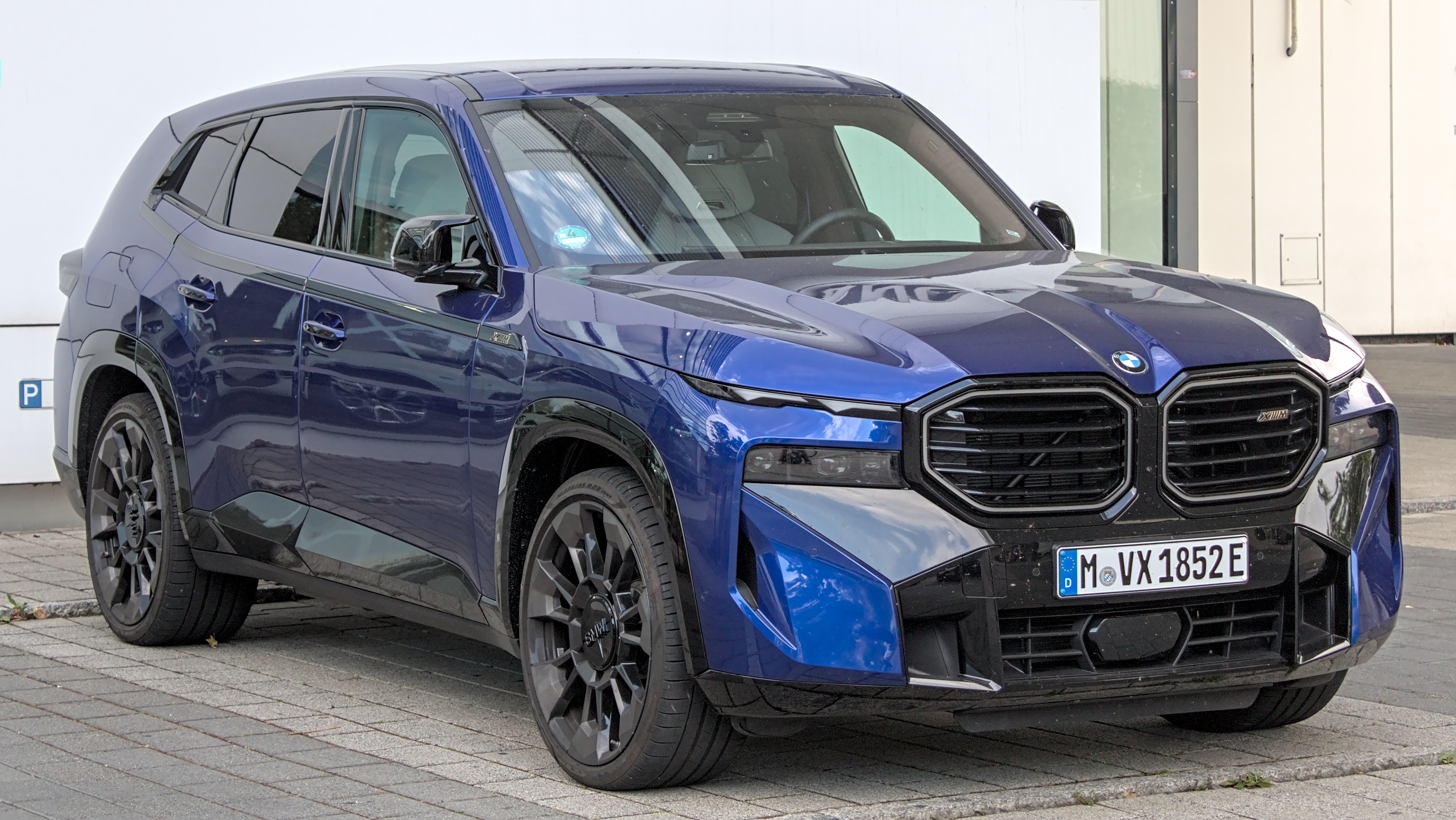
XM (G09)

==== i models ====
All-electric vehicles and plug-in hybrid vehicles are sold under the BMW i sub-brand. The current model range consists of:

- i3 D-segment (compact) sedan
- i4 D-segment (compact) liftback
- i5 E-segment (executive) sedan
- i7 F-segment (full-size) sedan
- iX1 C-segment (subcompact) SUV
- iX2 C-segment (subcompact) SUV
- iX3 D-segment (compact) SUV
- iX5 E-segment (mid-size) SUV
- iX E-segment (mid-size) SUV
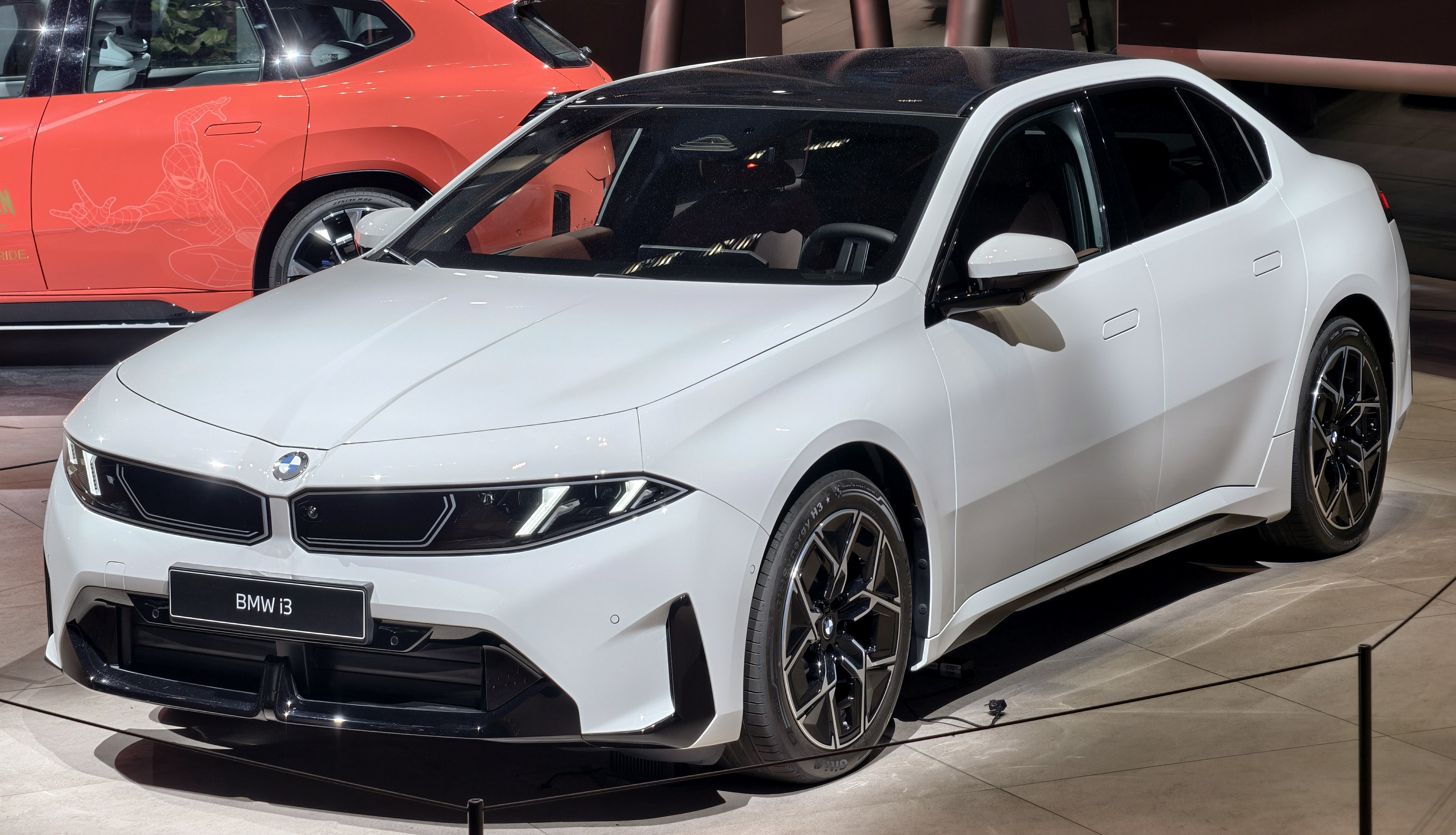
i3

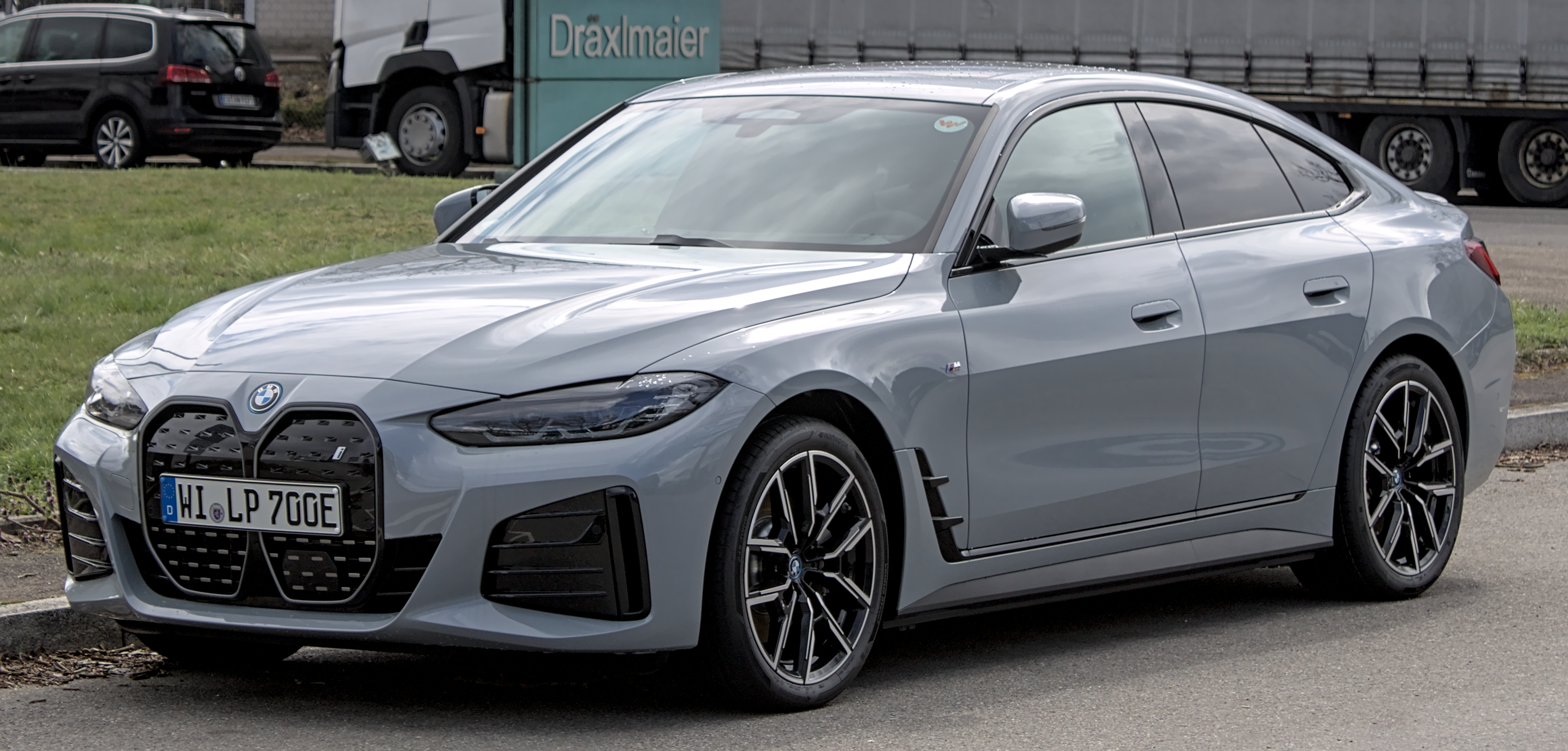
i4

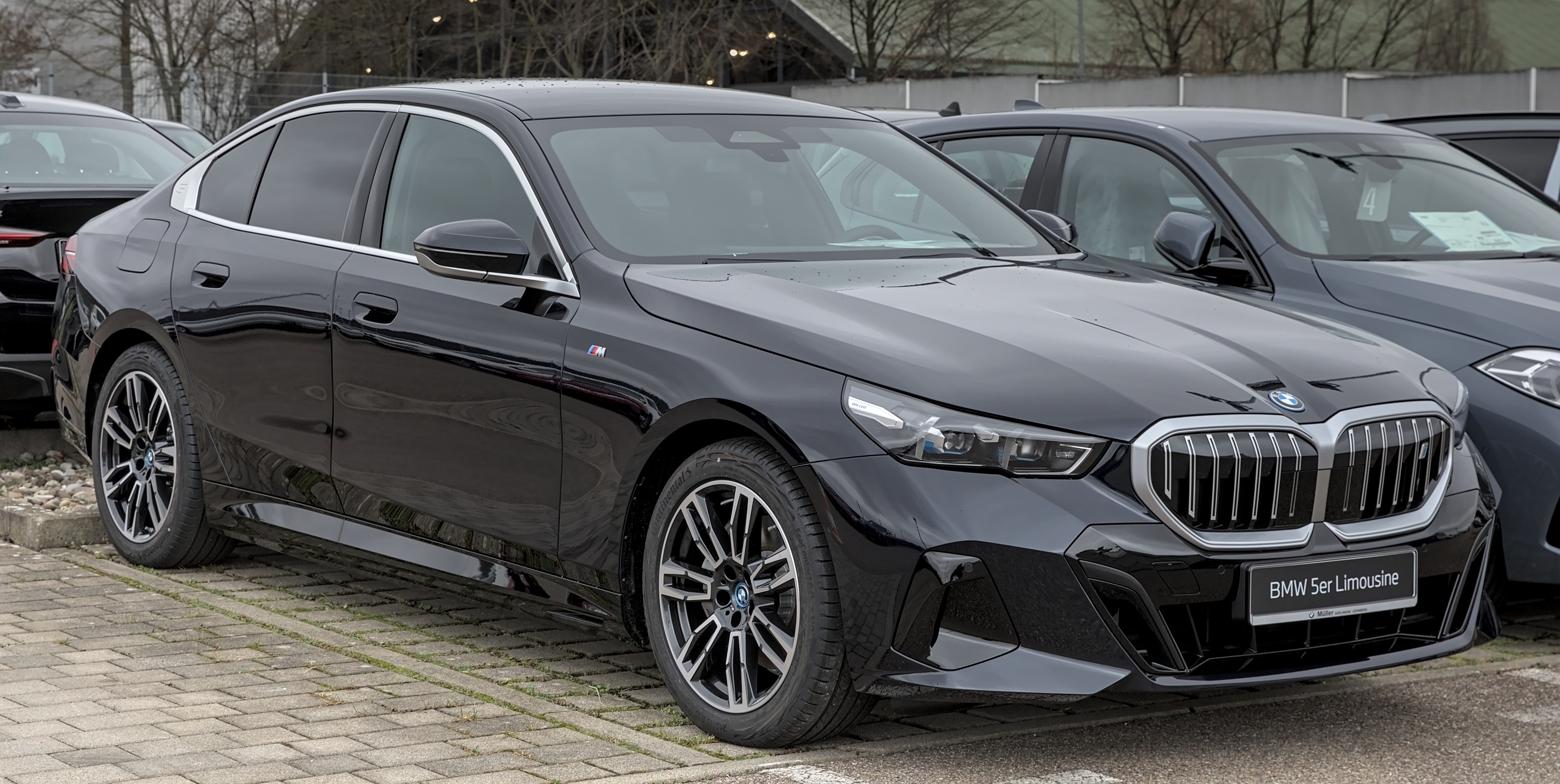
i5

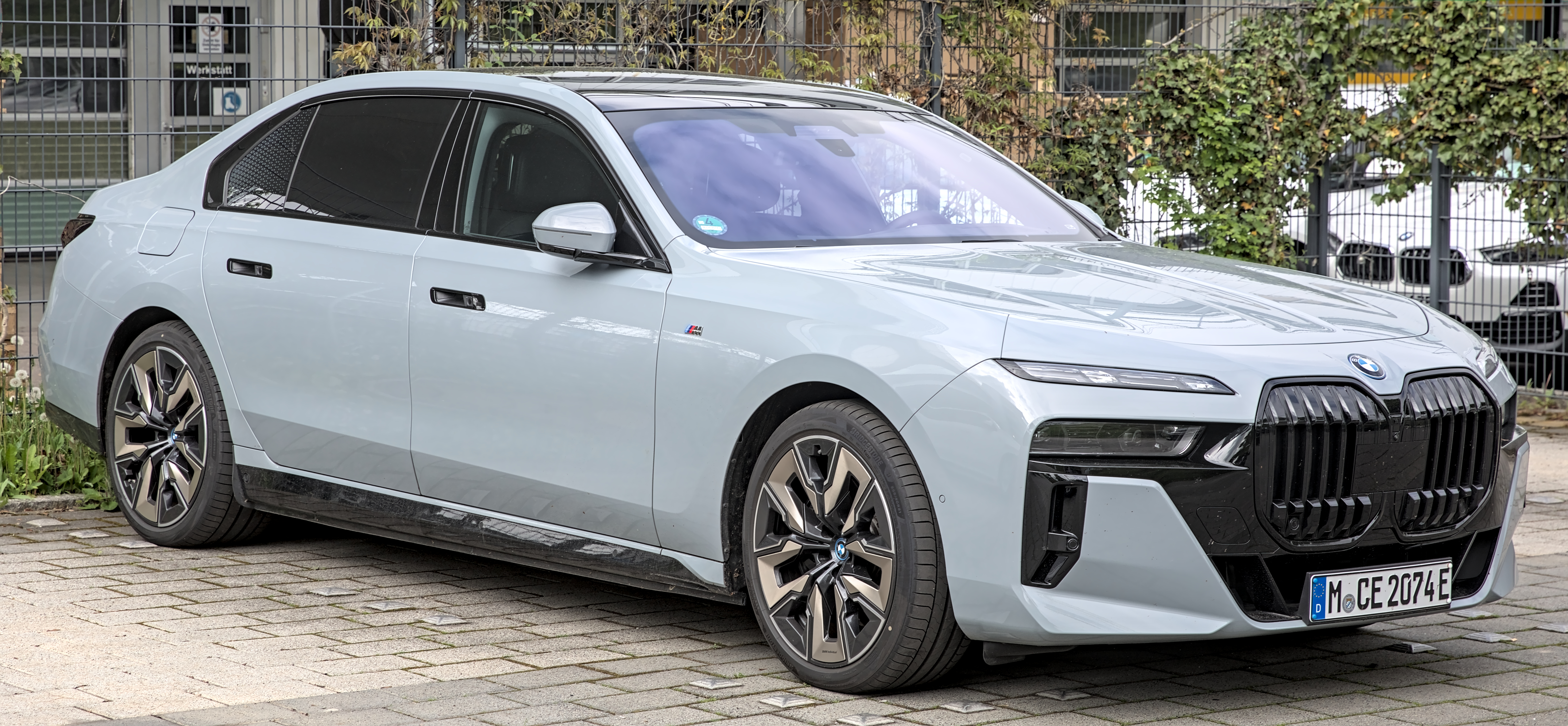
i7

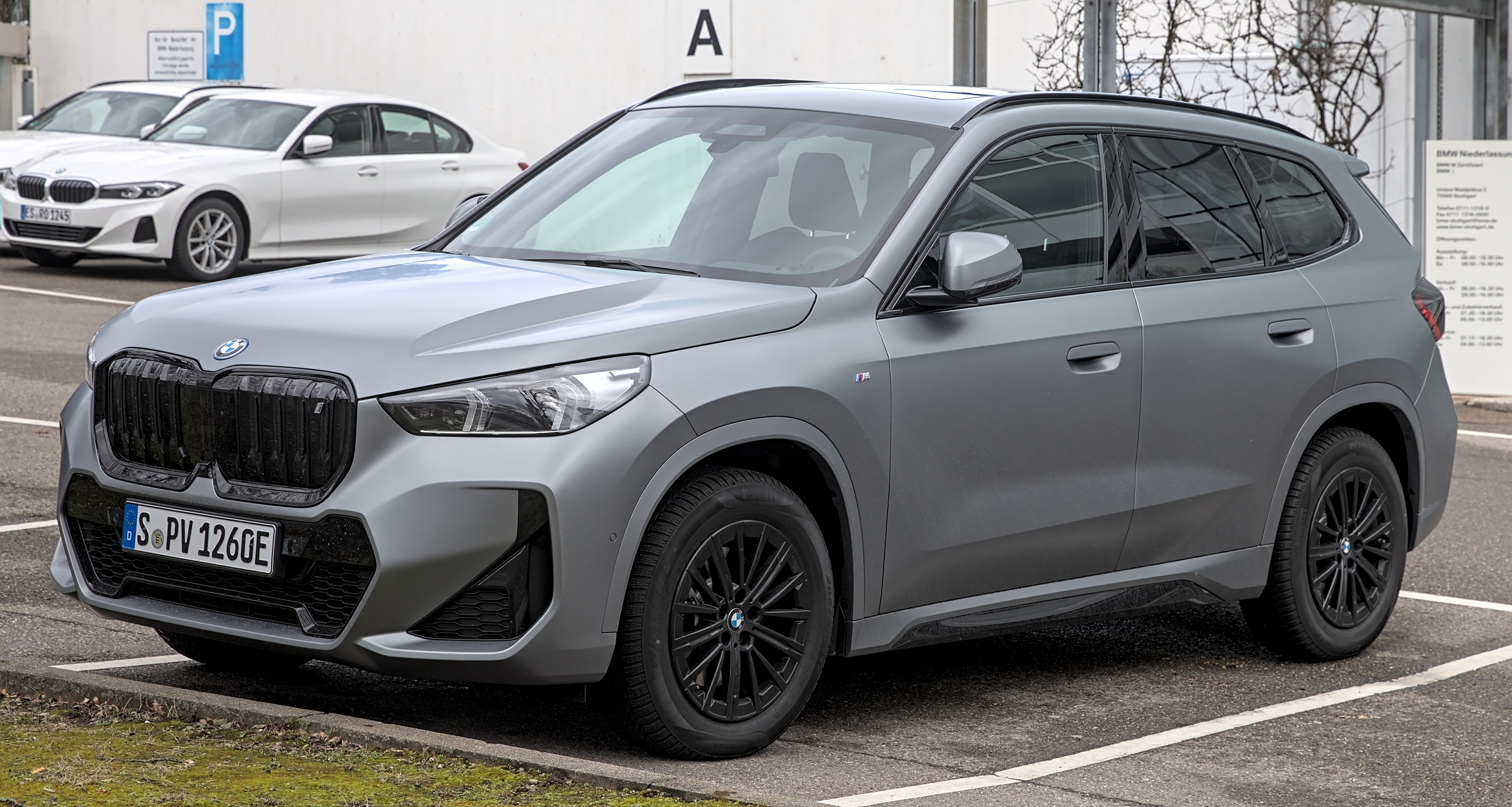
iX1

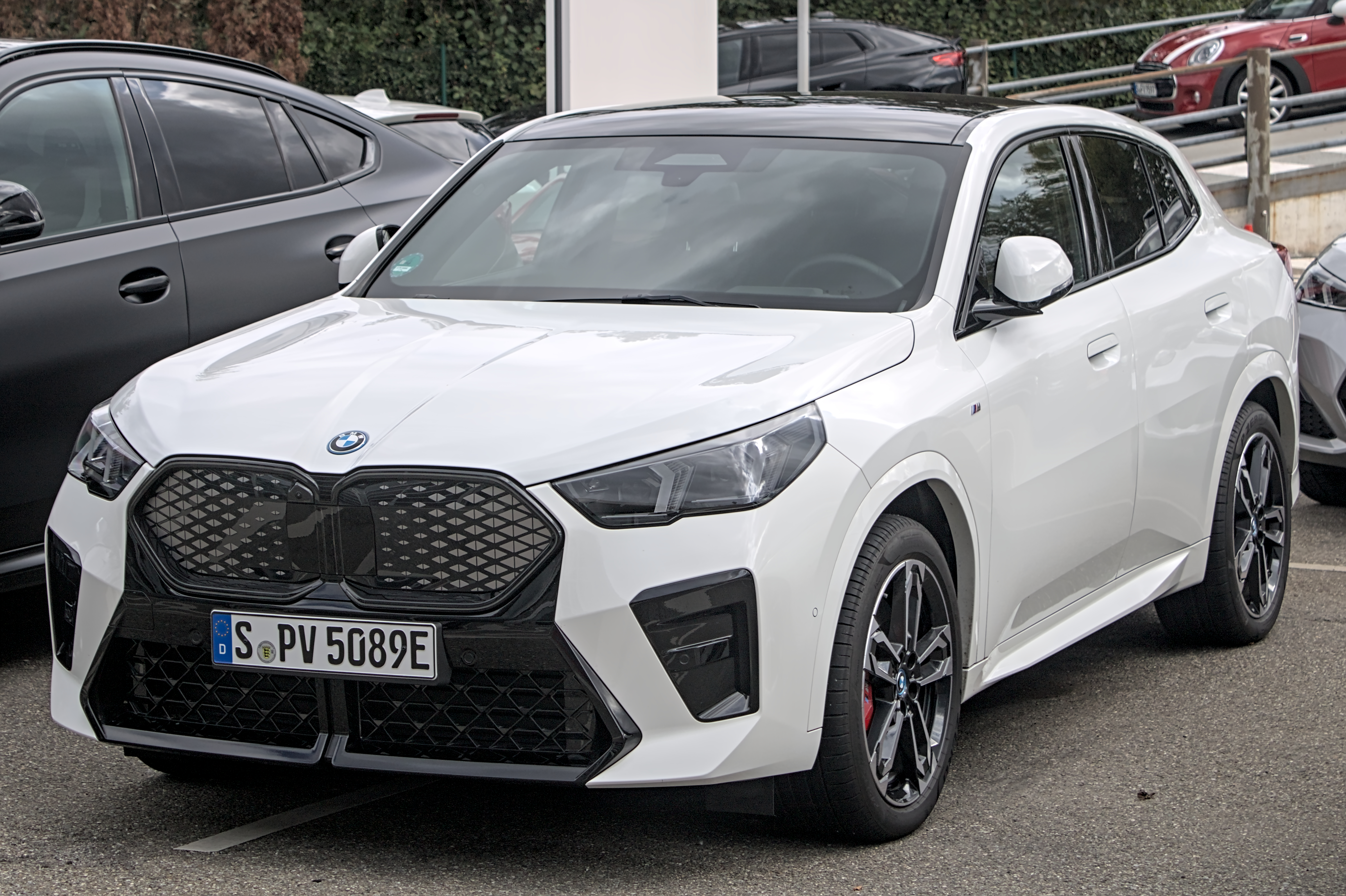
iX2

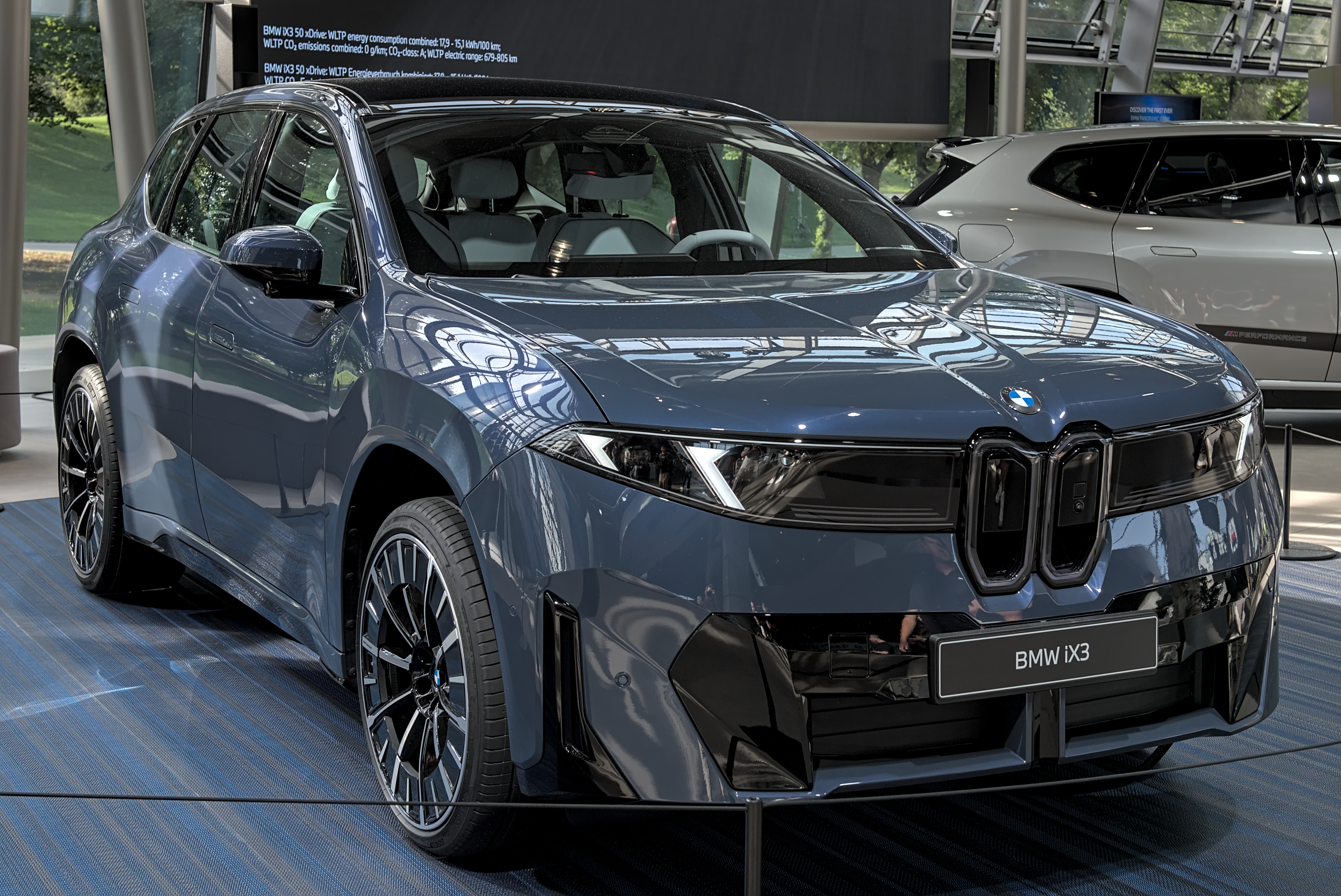
iX3

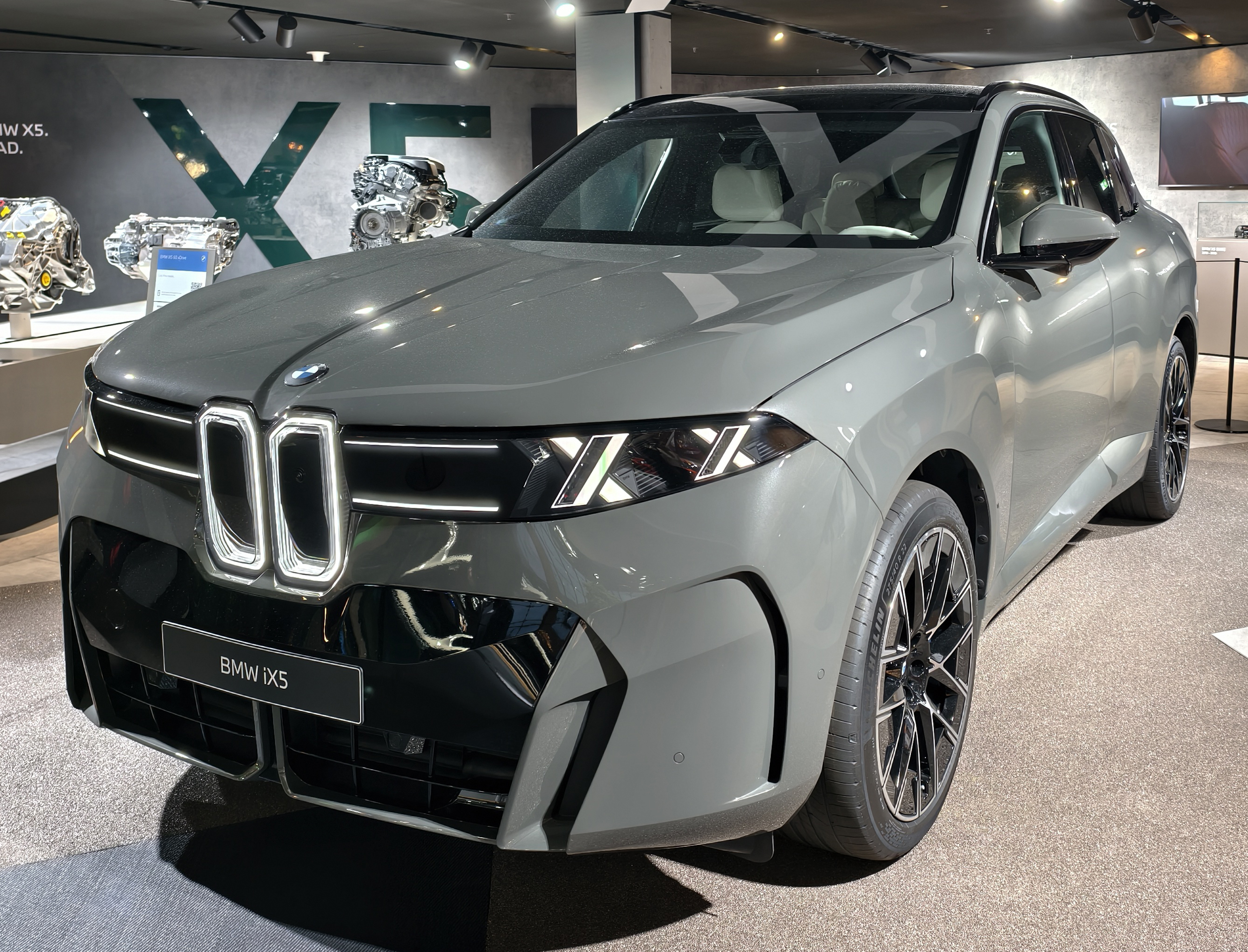
iX5

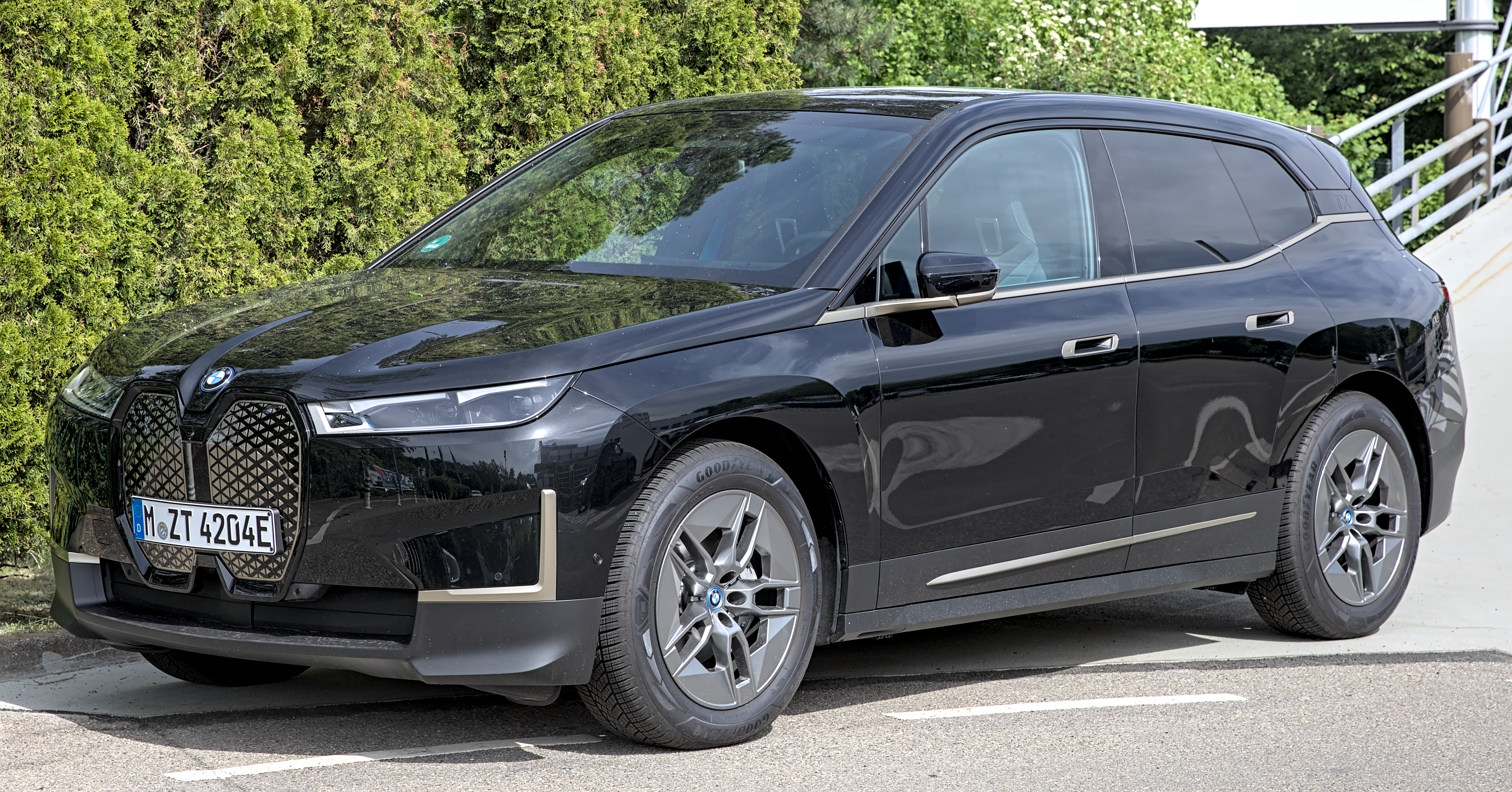
iX

In addition, several plug-in hybrid models built on existing platforms have been marketed as iPerformance models. Examples include the 225xe using a 1.5 L three-cylinder turbocharged petrol engine with an electric motor, the 330e/530e using a 2.0 L four-cylinder engine with an electric motor, and the 550e/750e using a 3.0 L six-cylinder engine with an electric motor. Also, crossover and SUV plug-in hybrid models have been released using i technology: X1 xDrive25e, X2 xDrive25e, X3 xDrive30e, and X5 xDrive40e.

==== M models ====
The BMW M GmbH subsidiary (called BMW Motorsport GmbH until 1993) started making high-performance versions of various BMW models in 1978.

As of November 2024, the M lineup is:

- M2 two-door coupe
- M3 four-door sedan and five-door station wagon
- M4 two-door coupe/convertible
- M5 four-door sedan and five-door station wagon
- X5 M mid-size SUV
- X6 M mid-size coupe SUV
- XM Large SUV
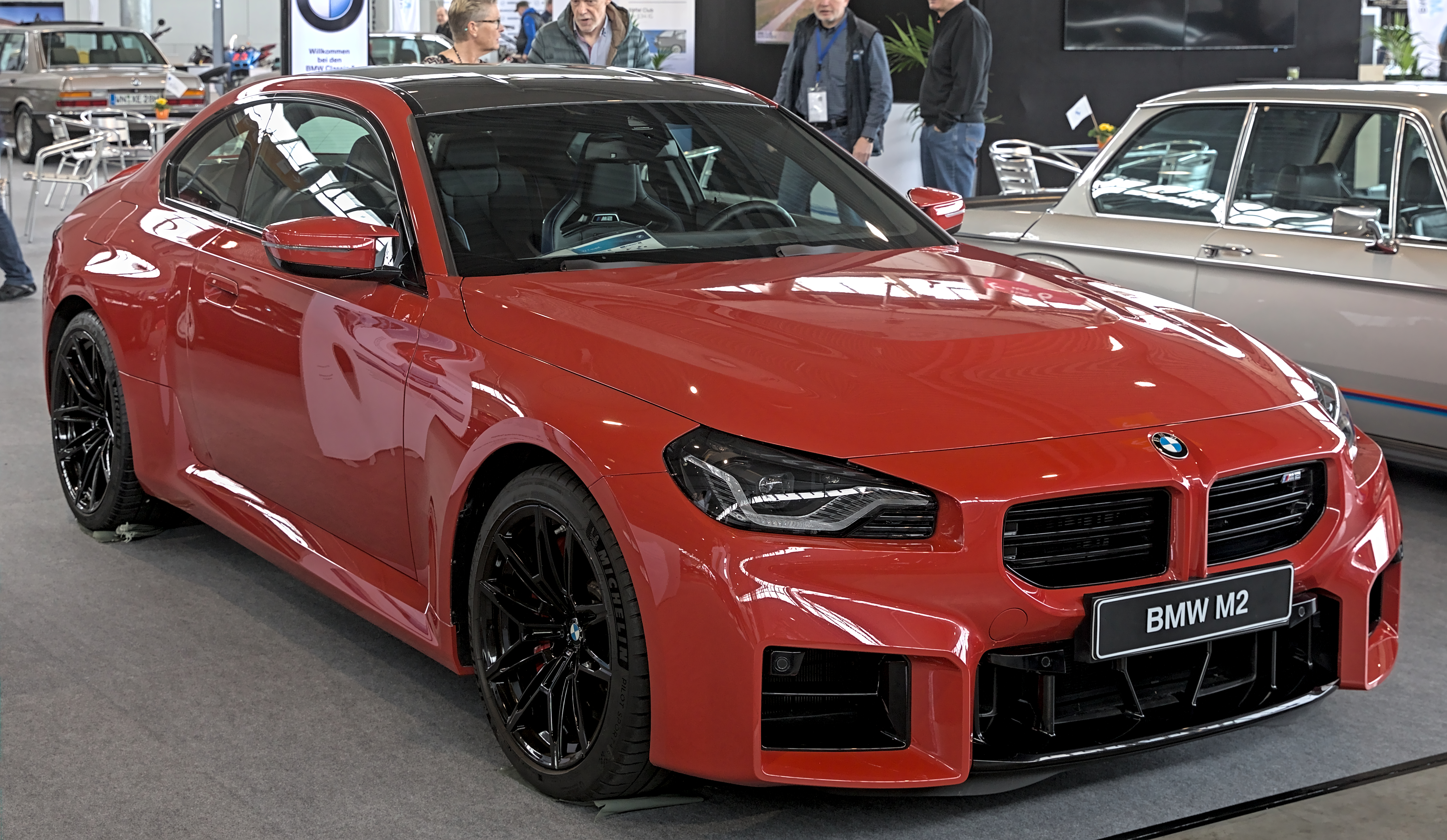
M2

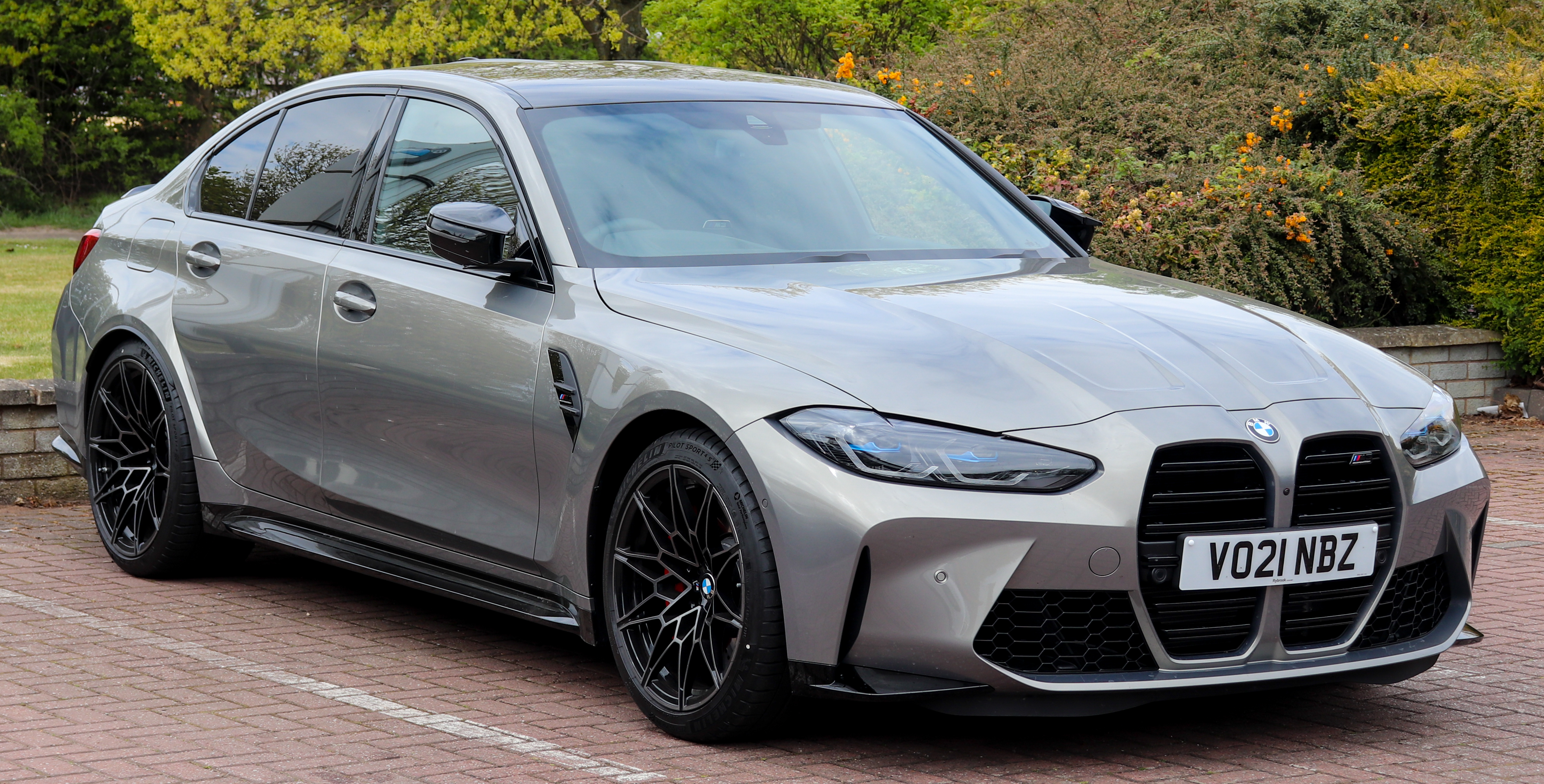
M3

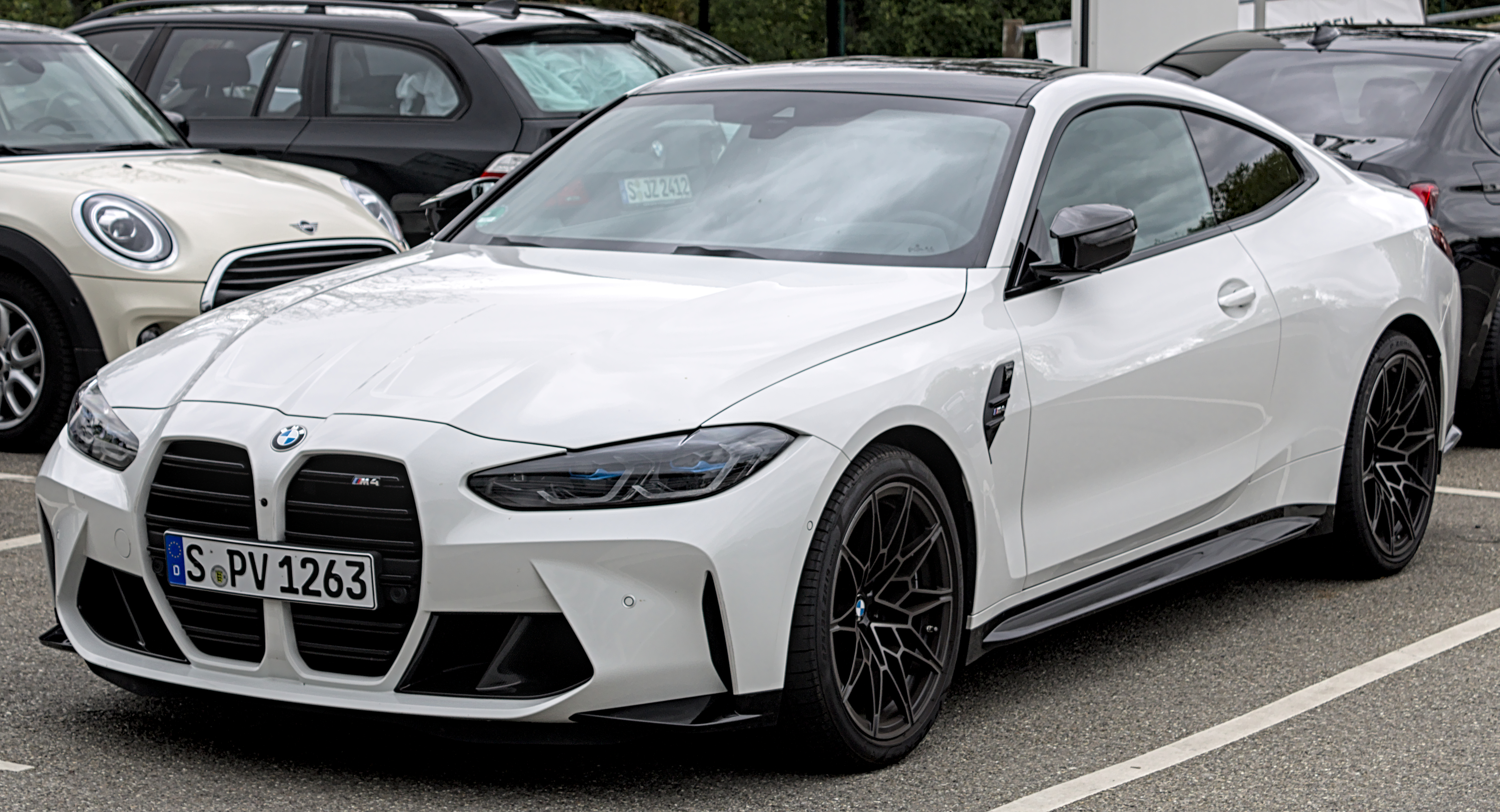
M4

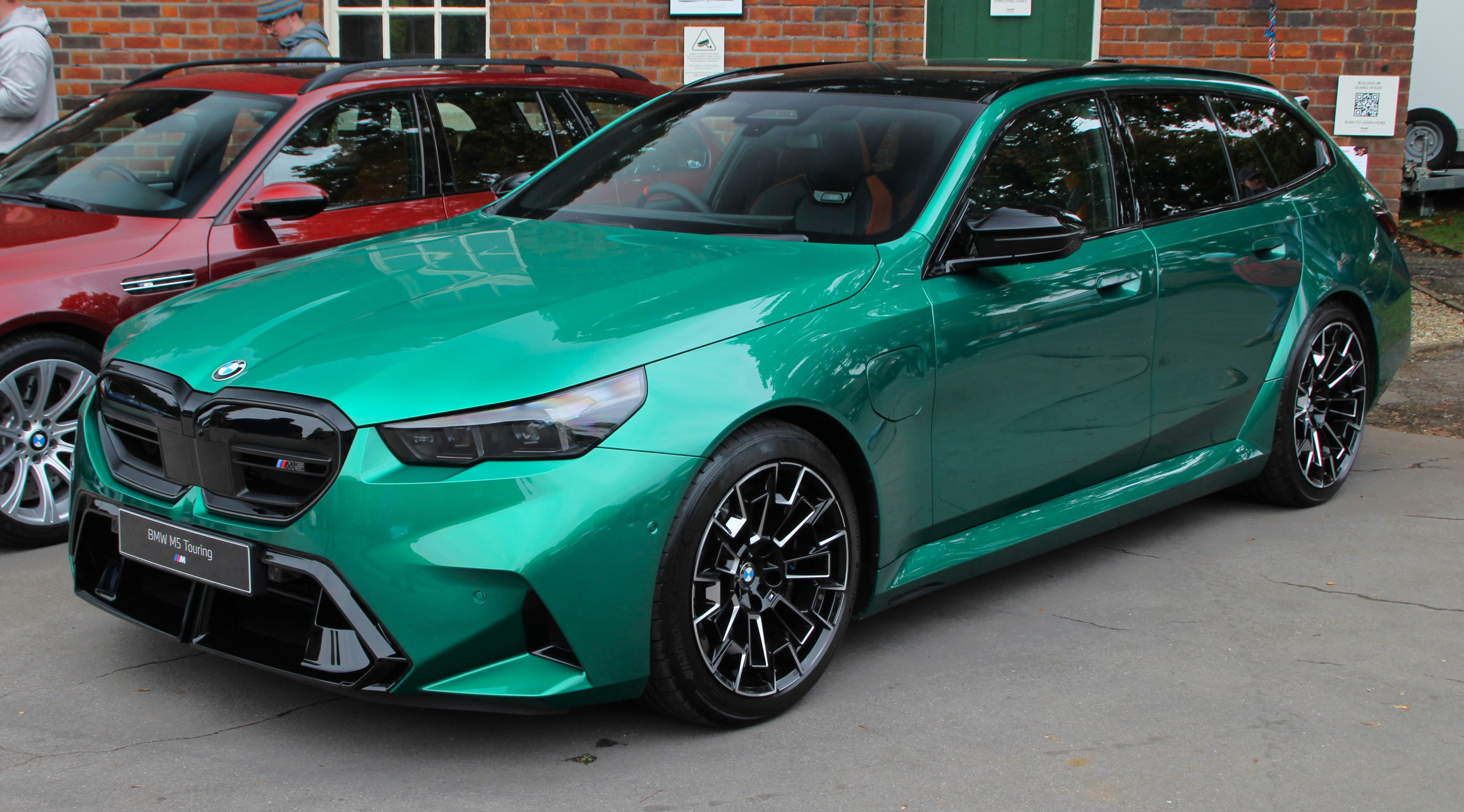
M5

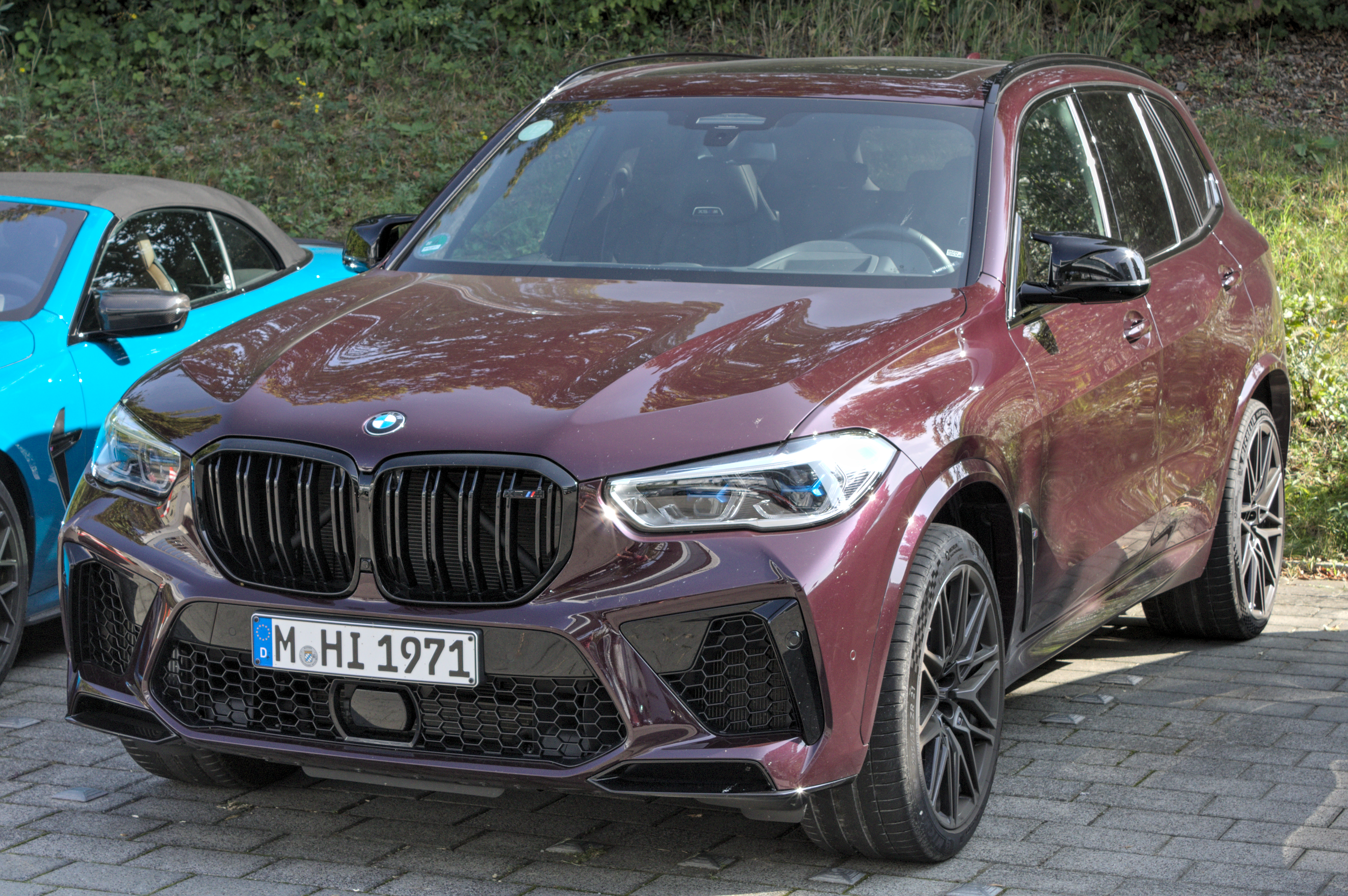
X5 M

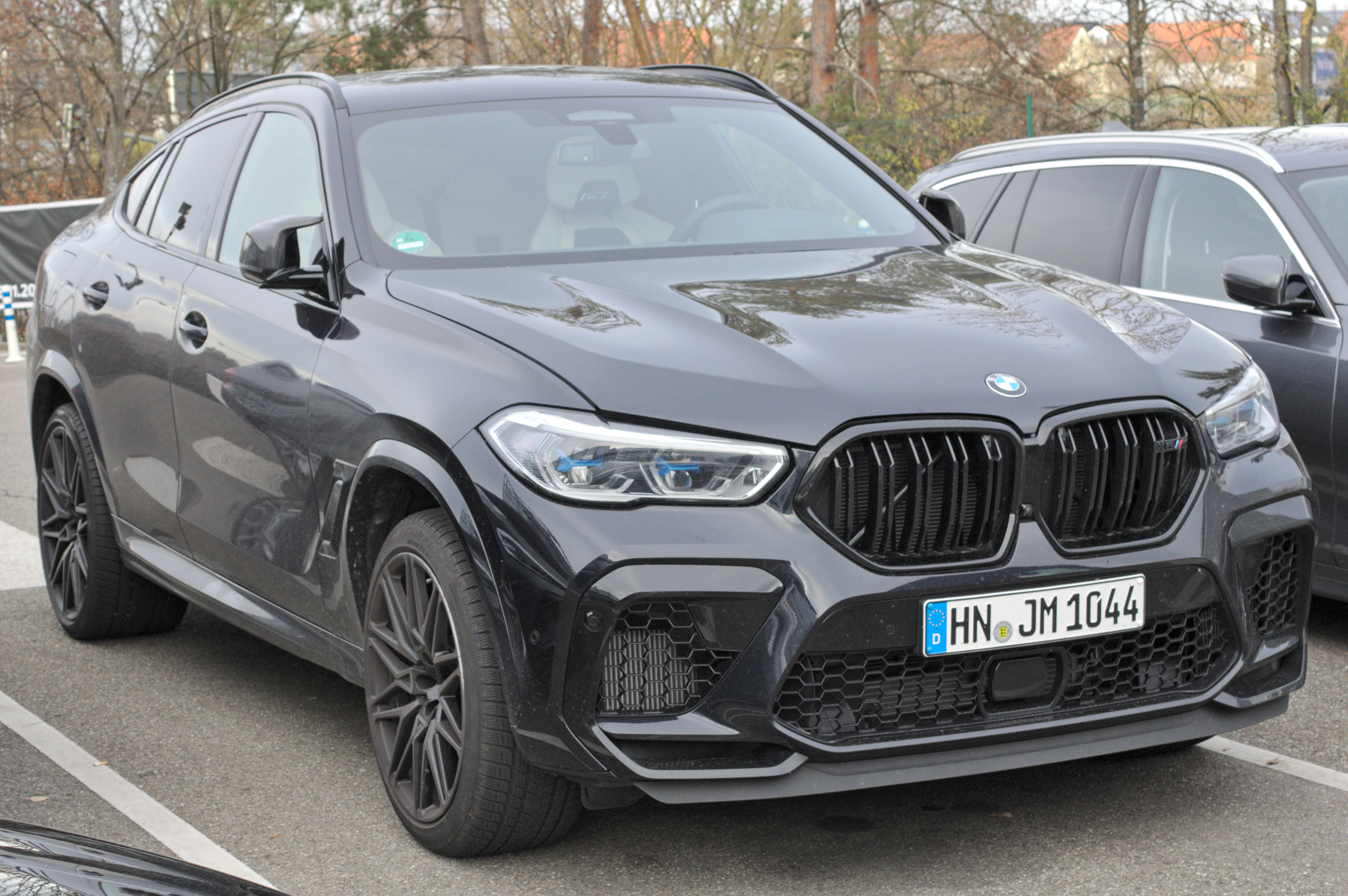
X6 M

The letter "M" is also often used in the marketing of BMW's regular models, for example the F20 M140i model, the G11 M760Li model and various optional extras called "M Sport", "M Performance" or similar.

=== Table of all models of the last 50 years ===
BMW model timeline

== Motorsport ==
BMW has a long history of motorsport activities, including:

- Touring cars, such as DTM, WTCC, ETCC and BTCC
- Formula One
- Endurance racing, such as 24 Hours Nürburgring, 24 Hours of Le Mans, 24 Hours of Daytona and Spa 24 Hours
- Isle of Man TT
- Dakar Rally
- American Le Mans Series
- IMSA SportsCar Championship
- Formula BMW, a junior racing Formula category
- Formula Two
- Formula E
- Superbike World Championship
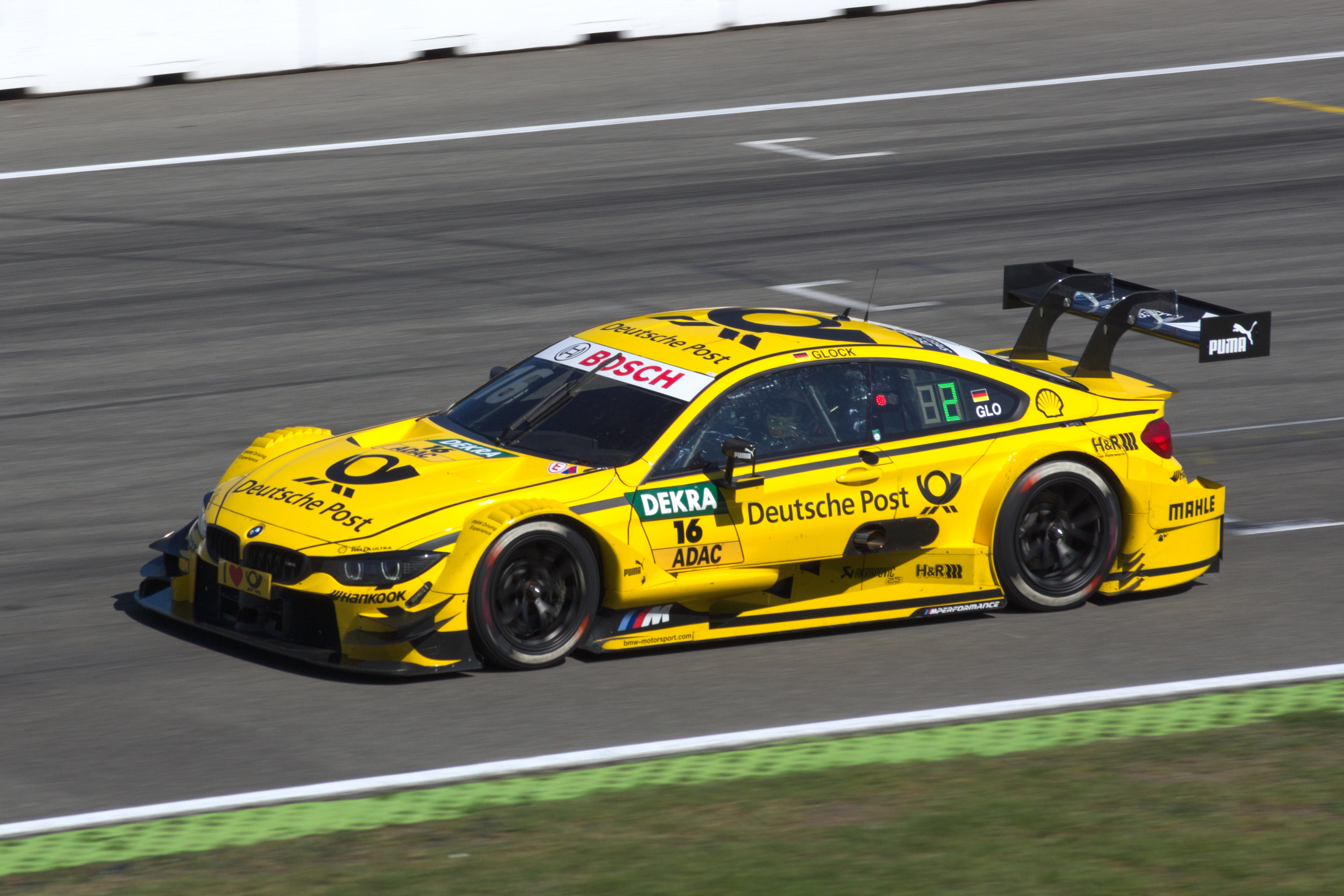
2016 BMW M4 DTM

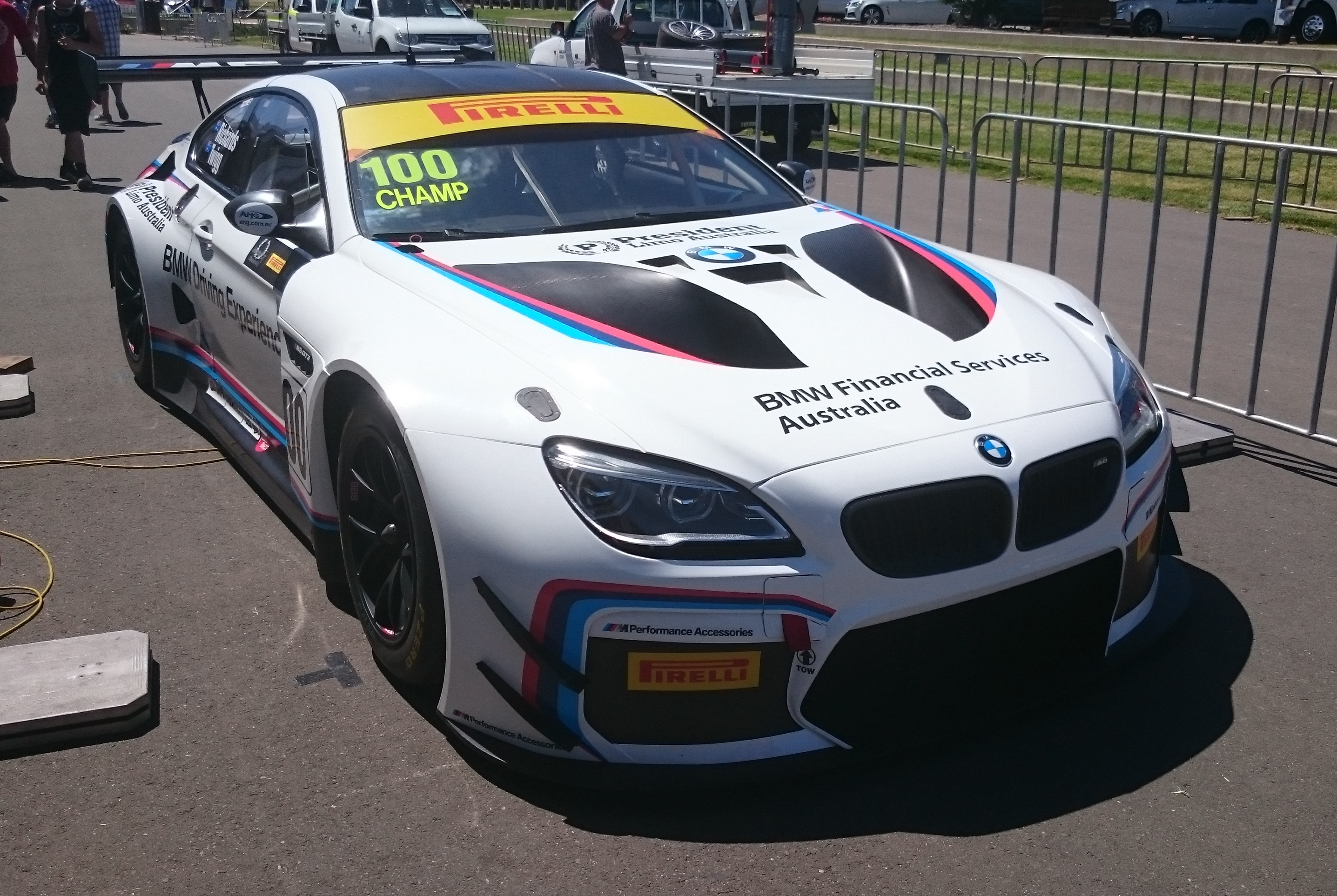
2016 BMW M6 GT3

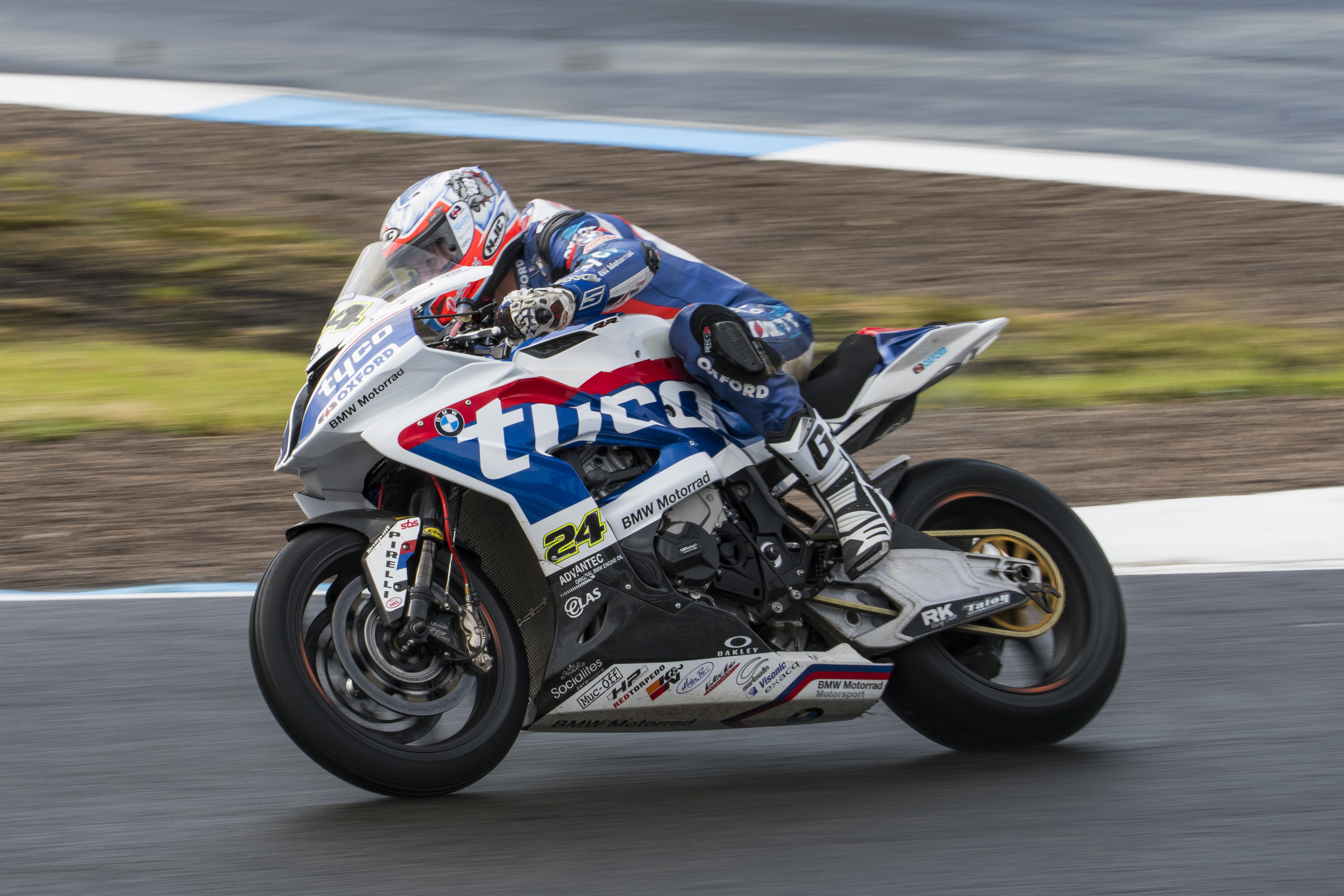
2016 BMW S1000RR

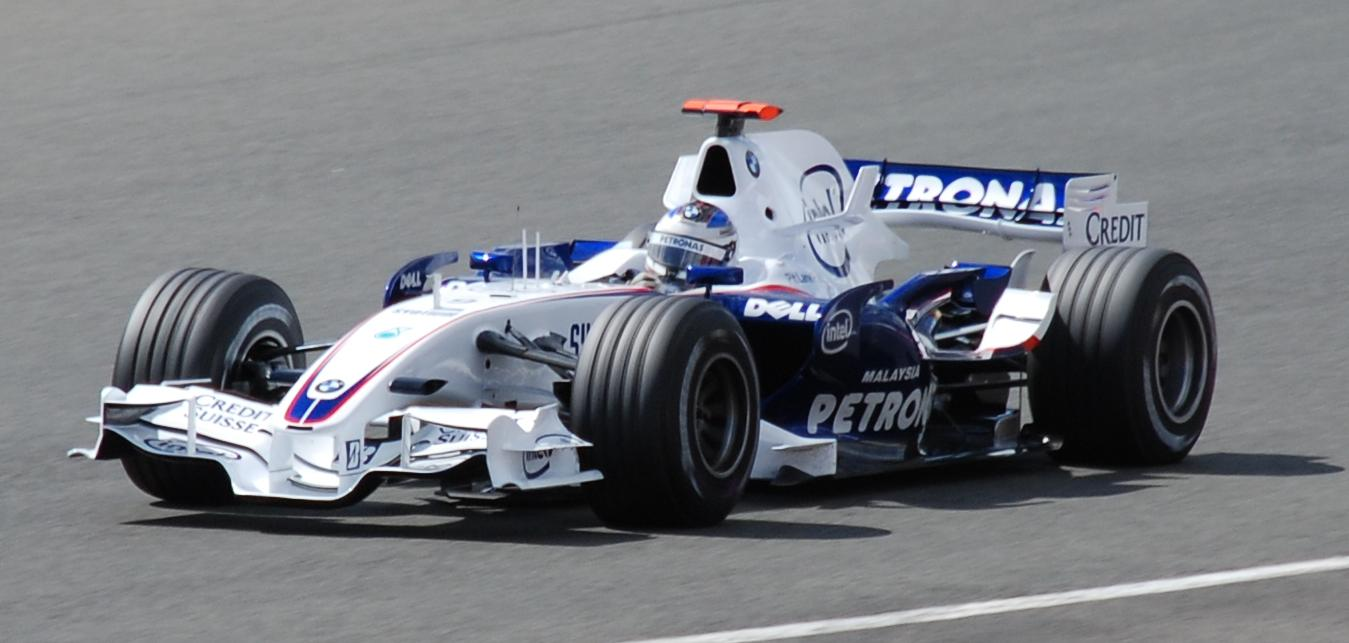
2007 BMW Sauber F1.07

== Involvement in the arts ==
=== Architecture ===
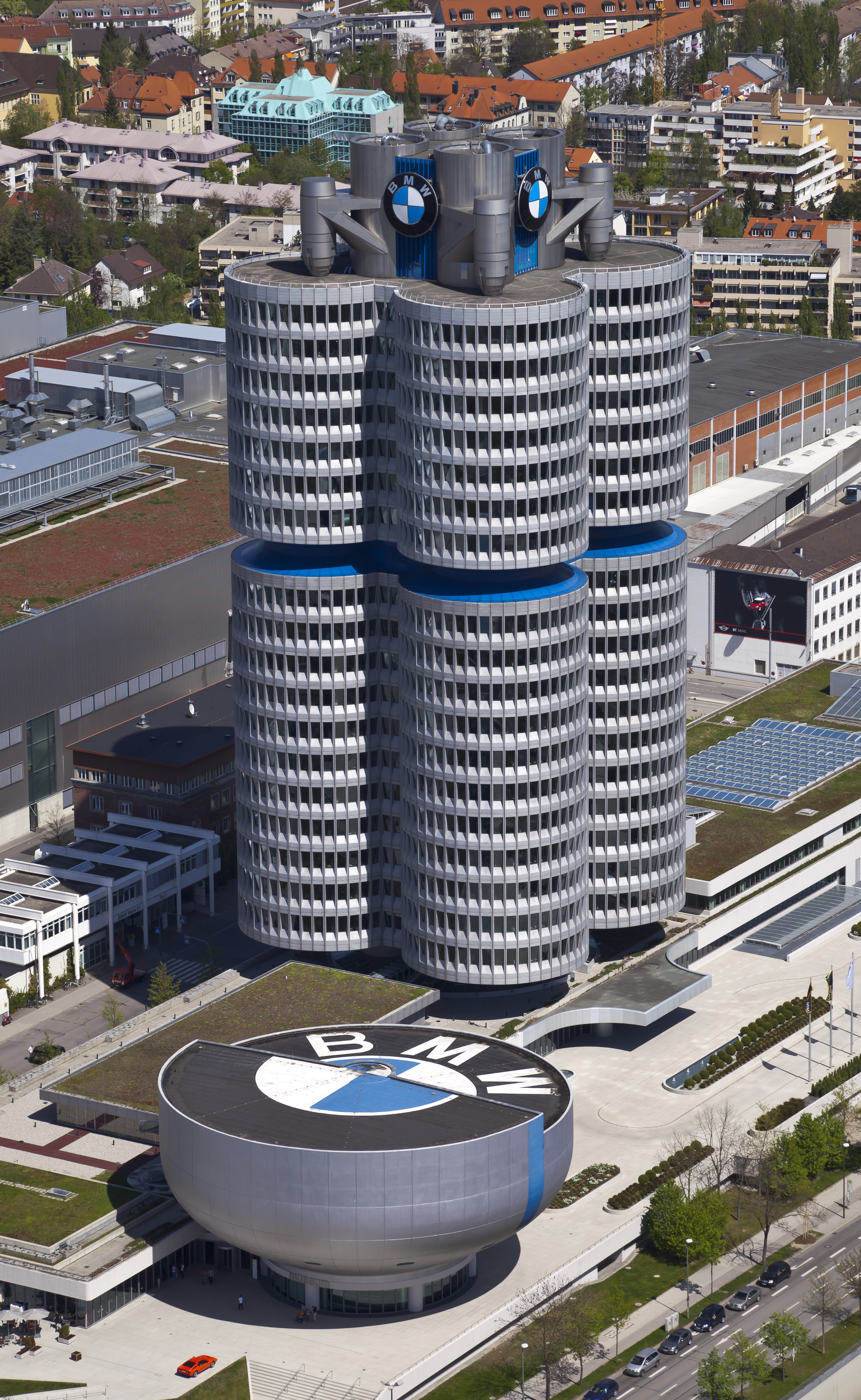
BMW Headquarters

The global BMW Headquarters in Munich is designed after the cylinder head of a four-cylinder engine. It was designed by Karl Schwanzer and was completed in 1972. The building has become a European icon and was declared a protected historic building in 1999. The main tower consists of four vertical cylinders standing next to and across from each other. Each cylinder is divided horizontally in its center by a mold in the facade. Notably, these cylinders do not stand on the ground; they are suspended from a central support tower.

BMW Museum is a futuristic cauldron-shaped building, which was also designed by Karl Schwanzer and opened in 1972. The interior has a spiral theme and the roof is a 40-metre diameter BMW logo.

BMW Welt, the company's exhibition space in Munich, was designed by Coop Himmelb(l)au and opened in 2007. It includes a showroom and lifting platforms where a customer's new car is theatrically unveiled to the customer.

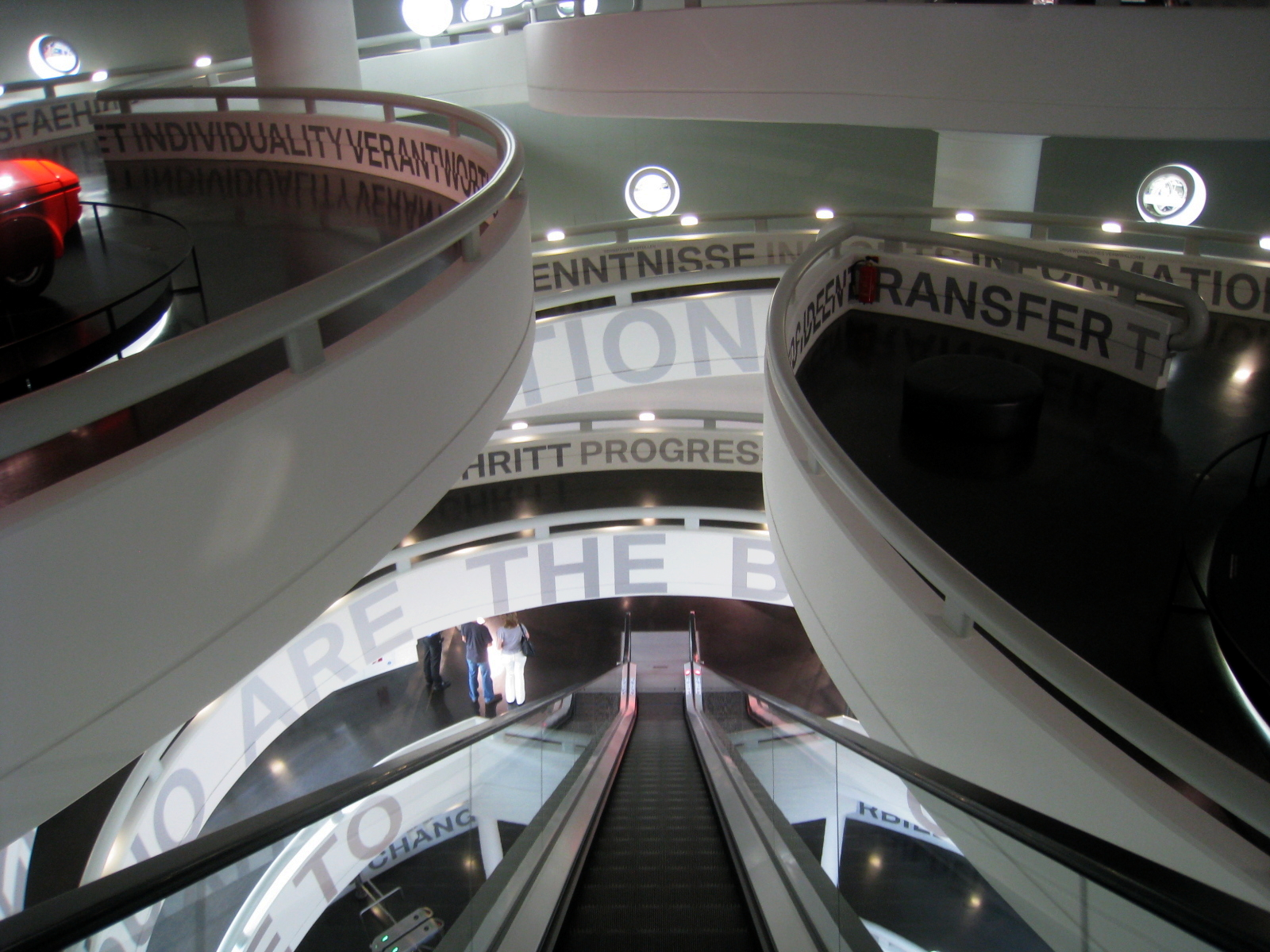
BMW Museum

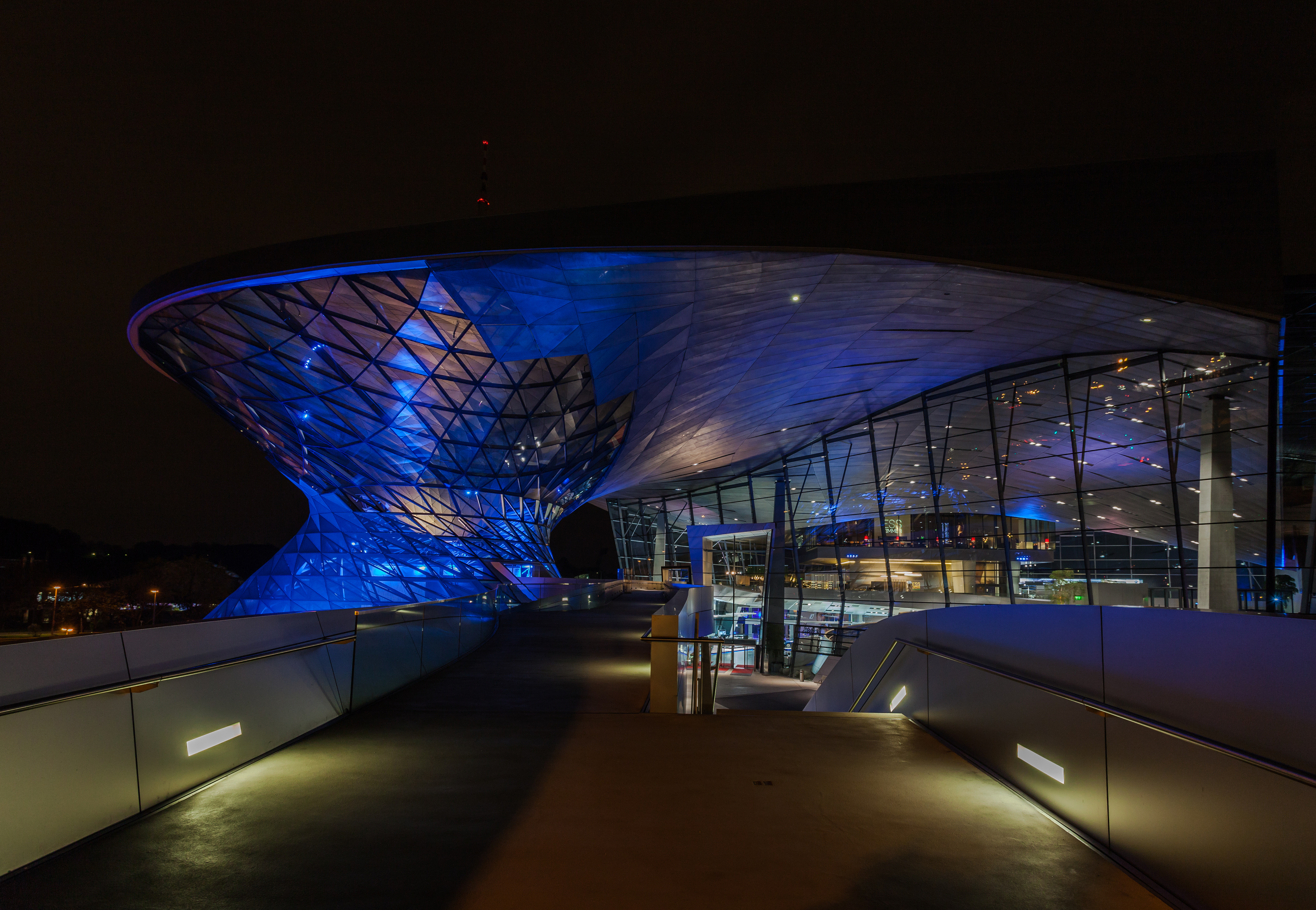
BMW Welt

=== Art Cars ===
In 1975, sculptor Alexander Calder was commissioned to paint the BMW 3.0 CSL racing car driven by Hervé Poulain at the 24 Hours of Le Mans, which became the first in the series of BMW Art Cars. Since Calder's work of art, many other renowned artists throughout the world have created BMW Art Cars, including David Hockney, Jenny Holzer, Roy Lichtenstein, Robert Rauschenberg, Frank Stella, and Andy Warhol. To date, a total of 19 BMW Art Cars, based on both racing and regular production vehicles, have been created.

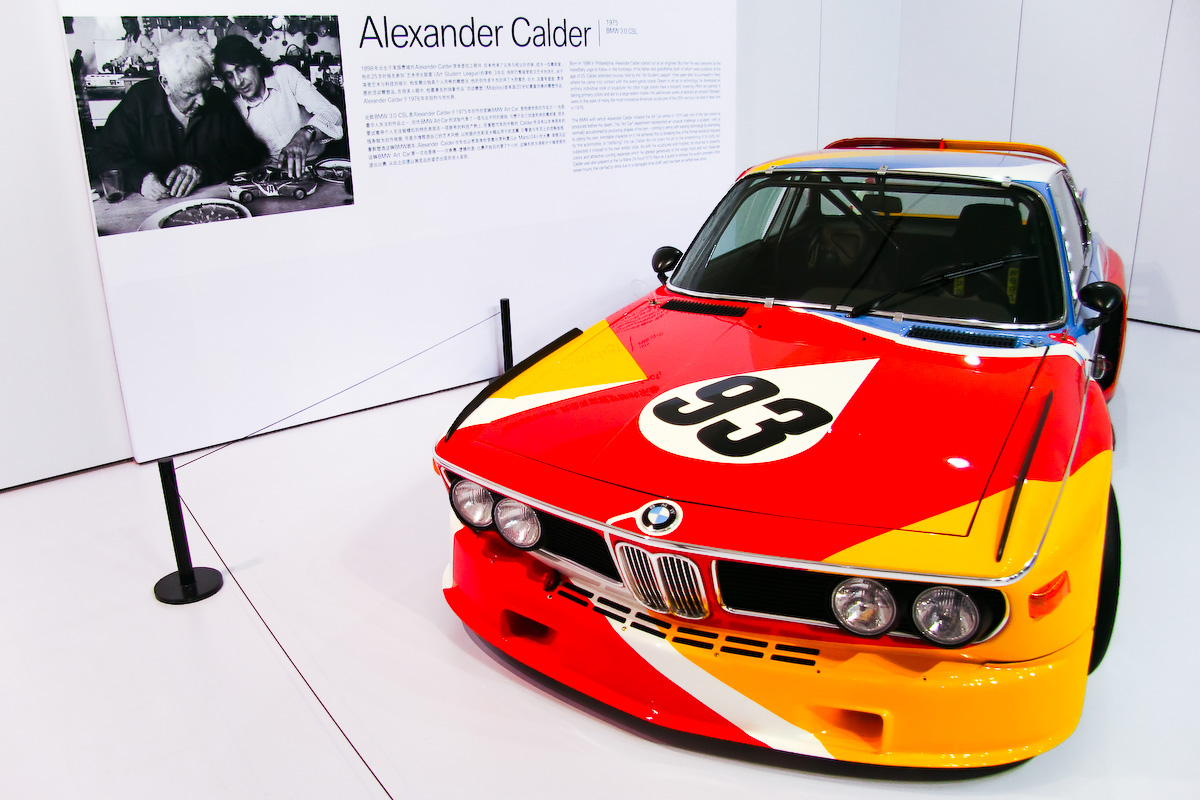
1975 3.0 CSL Art Car by Alexander Calder

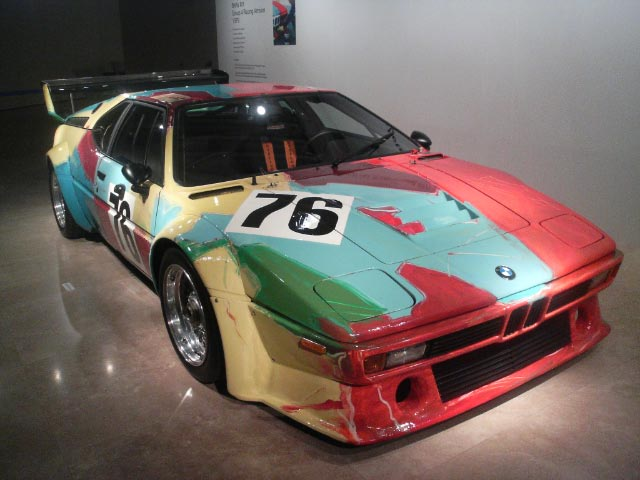
1979 M1 Art Car by Andy Warhol

=== Visual arts ===
BMW sponsors a number of awards in the visual arts. These include the BMW Art Journey award, which honors a young or mid-career artist in collaboration with Art Basel, and the BMW Painting Award, which was created to promote painting in Spain by finding new talent and showcasing their work.

BMW was the principal sponsor of the 1998 The Art of the Motorcycle exhibition at various Guggenheim museums, though the financial relationship between BMW and the Guggenheim Foundation was criticised in many quarters.

In 2012, BMW began sponsoring Independent Collectors production of the BMW Art Guide, which is the first global guide to private and publicly accessible collections of contemporary art worldwide. The fourth edition, released in 2016, features 256 collections from 43 countries.

== Production and sales ==
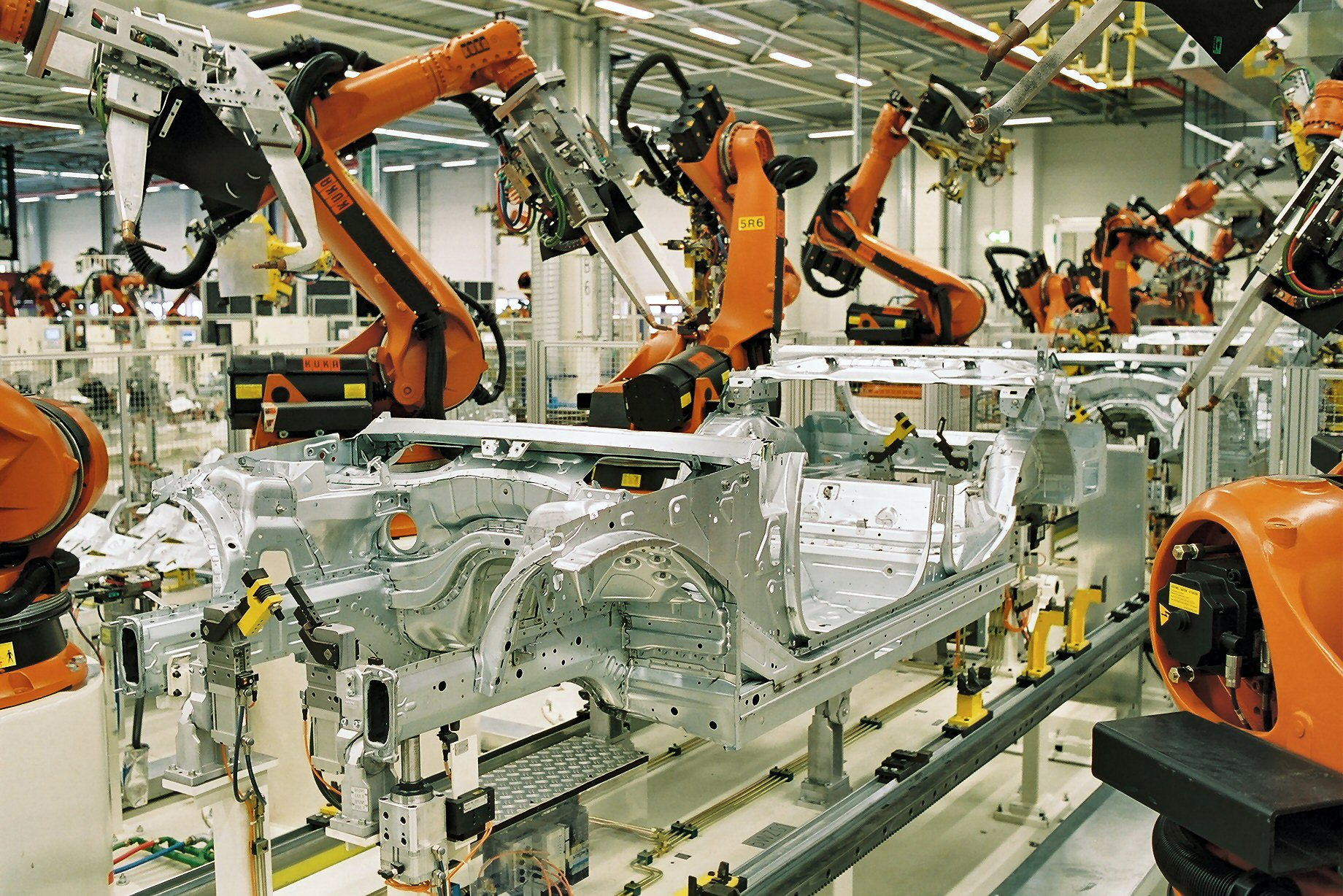
Spot welding 3 Series bodies in Leipzig, Germany

BMW produces complete automobiles in the following countries:

- Germany: Munich, Dingolfing, Regensburg and Leipzig
- United States: Spartanburg
- Mexico: San Luis Potosí
- China: Shenyang
- South Africa: Rosslyn
- Hungary: Debrecen

BMW also has local assembly operation using complete knock-down (CKD) components in Brazil, Thailand, Russia, Egypt, Indonesia, Malaysia and India.

In the UK, BMW has a Mini factory near Oxford, plants in Swindon and Hams Hall, and Rolls-Royce vehicle assembly at Goodwood. In 2020, these facilities were shut down for the period from 23 March to 17 April due to the coronavirus outbreak.

The BMW group (including Mini and Rolls-Royce) produced 1,366,838 automobiles in 2006 and then 1,481,253 automobiles in 2010. BMW Motorcycles are being produced at the company's Berlin factory, which earlier had produced aircraft engines for Siemens.

By 2011, about 56% of BMW-brand vehicles produced were powered by petrol engines and the remaining 44% by diesel engines. Of those petrol vehicles, about 27% were four-cylinder models and about nine percent are eight-cylinder models, the overwhelming majority being sixes. On average, 9,000 vehicles per day exit BMW plants, and 63% are transported by rail.

Annual production since 2005, according to BMW's annual reports:

Year	BMW	MINI	Rolls-Royce	Motorcycle*
2005	1,122,308	200,119	692	92,013
2006	1,179,317	186,674	847	103,759
2007	1,302,774	237,700	1,029	104,396
2008	1,203,482	235,019	1,417	118,452
2009	1,043,829	213,670	918	93,243
2010	1,236,989	241,043	3,221	112,271
2011	1,440,315	294,120	3,725	110,360
2012	1,547,057	311,490	3,279	113,811
2013	1,699,835	303,177	3,354	110,127
2014	1,838,268	322,803	4,495	133,615
2015	1,933,647	342,008	3,848	151,004
2016	2,002,997	352,580	4,179	145,555
2017	2,123,947	378,486	3,308	185,682
2018	2,168,496	368,685	4,353	162,687
2019	2,205,841	352,729	5,455	187,116
2020	1,980,740	271,121	3,776	168,104
2021	2,166,644	288,713	5,912	187,500
2022	2,089,801	286,265	6,239	215,932
2023	2,340,547	315,196	6,179	221,988

Annual sales and deliveries since 1972, according to BMW's annual reports:

Year	BMW	MINI	Rolls-Royce	Motorcycle*
1972	182,858			
1973	197,446			
1974	184,330			
1975	226,688			
1976	275,596			
1977	288,260			
1978	321,196			
1979	335,132			
1980	339,232			
1981	348,946			
1982	377,684			
1983	422,500			
1984	434,300			
1985	440,700			
1986	446,100			
1987	459,500			
1988	495,800			
1989	523,000			
1990	525,900			
1991	552,700			
1992	582,493			
1993	534,397			
1994	573,000			
1995	595,000			
1996	644,107			
1997	675,076			
1998	699,378			
1999	751,272			
2000	822,181			
2001	880,677			
2002	913,225			
2003	928,000			
2004	1,023,583			
2005	1,126,798	200,428	797	97,474
2006	1,185,088	188,077	805	100,064
2007	1,276,793	222,875	1,010	102,467
2008	1,202,239	232,425	1,212	115,196
2009	1,068,770	216,538	1,002	100,358
2010	1,224,280	234,175	2,711	110,113
2011	1,380,384	285,060	3,538	113,572
2012	1,540,085	301,525	3,575	117,109
2013	1,655,138	305,030	3,630	115,215**
2014	1,811,719	302,183	4,063	123,495
2015	1,905,234	338,466	3,785	136,963
2016	2,003,359	360,233	4,011	145,032
2017	2,088,283	371,881	3,362	164,153
2018	2,114,963	364,135	4,194	165,566
2019	2,185,793	347,474	5,100	175,162
2020	2,028,841	292,582	3,756	169,272
2021	2,213,379	302,138	5,586	194,261
2022	2,100,689	292,922	6,021	202,895
2023	2,225,793	295,358	6,032	209,066

* In 2008–2012, motorcycle productions figures include Husqvarna models.
** Excluding Husqvarna, sales volume up to 2013: 59,776 units.

== Recalls ==
In November 2016, BMW recalled 136,000 2007–2012 model year U.S. cars for fuel pump wiring problems possibly resulting in fuel leak and engine stalling or restarting issues.

In 2018, BMW recalled 106,000 diesel vehicles in South Korea with a defective exhaust gas recirculation module, which caused 39 engine fires. The recall was then expanded to 324,000 more cars in Europe. Following the recall in South Korea, the government banned cars which had not yet been inspected from driving on public roads. This affected up to 25% of the recalled cars, where the owners had been notified but the cars had not yet been inspected. BMW is reported to have been aware since 2016 that more than 4% of the affected cars in South Korea had experienced failures in the EGR coolers, leading to approximately 20 owners suing the company.

== Industry collaboration ==
BMW has collaborated with other car manufacturers on the following occasions:

- McLaren Automotive: BMW designed and produced the V12 engine that powered the McLaren F1.
- Groupe PSA (predecessor to Stellantis): Joint production of four-cylinder petrol engines, beginning in 2004.
- Daimler Benz: Joint venture to produce the hybrid drivetrain components used in the ActiveHybrid 7. Development of automated driving technology.
- Toyota: Three-part agreement in 2013 to jointly develop fuel cell technology, develop a joint platform for a sports car (for the 2018 BMW Z4 (G29) and Toyota Supra) and research lithium-air batteries.
- Audi and Mercedes: Joint purchase of Nokia's Here WeGo (formerly Here Maps) in 2015.
- In 2018, Horizn Studios collaborated with BMW to launch special luggage editions.

== Sponsorships ==
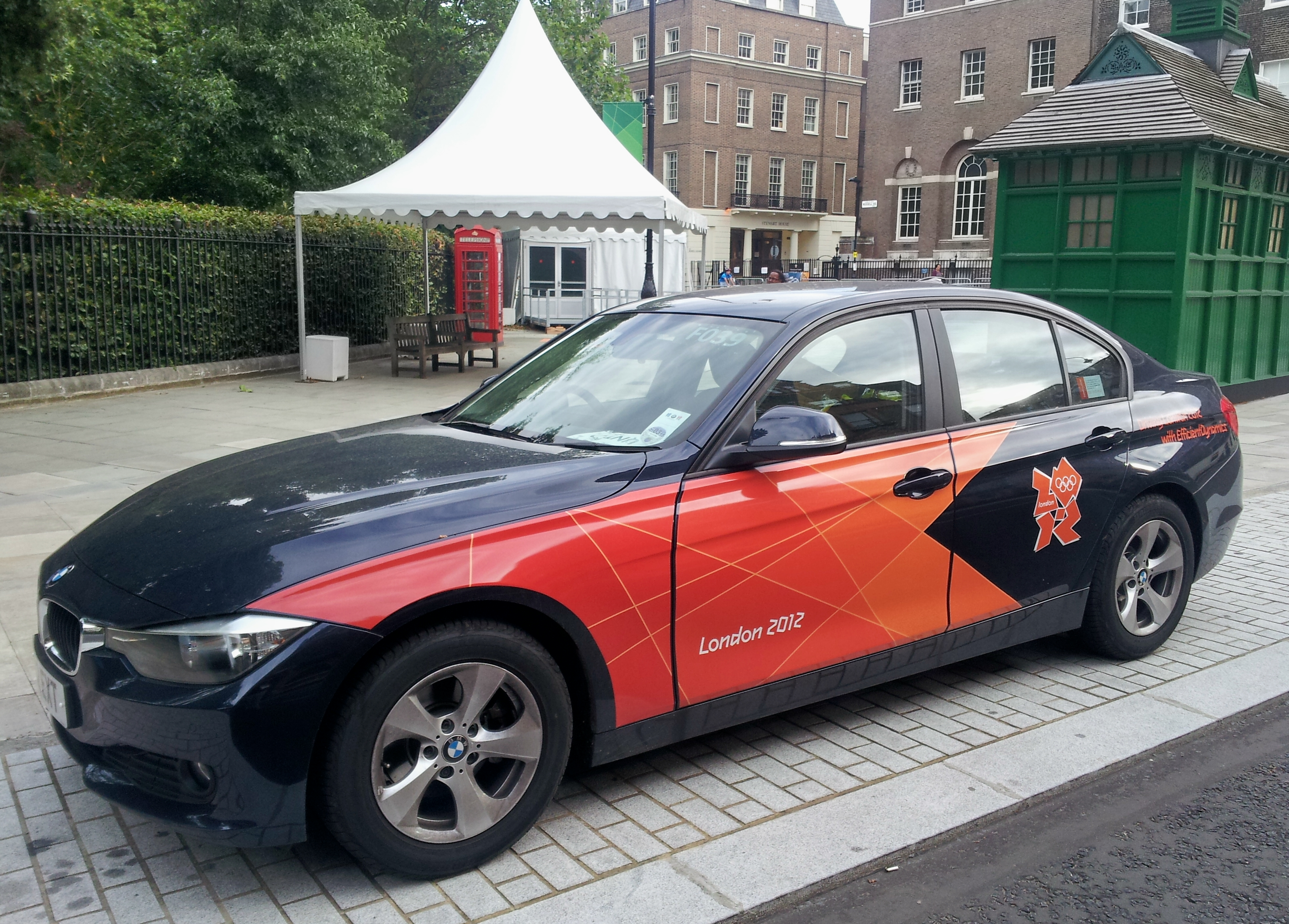
BMW sponsor car at the London 2012 Olympics

BMW made a six-year sponsorship deal with the United States Olympic Committee in July 2010.

In golf, BMW has sponsored various events, including the PGA Championship since 2007, the Italian Open from 2009 to 2012, the BMW Masters in China from 2012 to 2015 and the BMW International Open in Munich since 1989.

In rugby, BMW sponsored the South Africa national rugby union team from 2011 to 2015.

== Car-sharing services ==
DriveNow was a joint-venture between BMW and Sixt that operated in Europe from 2011 until 2019. By December 2012, DriveNow operated over 1,000 vehicles, in five cities and with approximately 60,000 customers.

In 2012, the BMW-owned subsidiary Alphabet began a corporate car-sharing service in Europe called AlphaCity. The ReachNow car-sharing service was launched in Seattle in April 2016. ReachNow currently operates in Seattle, Portland and Brooklyn.

In 2018, BMW announced the launching of a pilot car subscription service for the United States called Access by BMW (its first one for the country), in Nashville, Tennessee. In January 2021, the company said that Access by BMW was "suspended".

== Overseas subsidiaries ==
=== Production facilities ===
==== China ====
The first BMW production facility in China was opened in 2004, as a result of a joint venture between BMW and Brilliance Auto. The plant was opened in the Shenyang industrial area and produces 3 Series and 5 Series models for the Chinese market. In 2012, a second factory was opened in Shenyang. Between January and November 2014, BMW sold 415,200 vehicles in China, through a network of over 440 BMW stores and 100 Mini stores. On 7 October 2021, BMW announced it would begin additional production of the X5 in China. In February 2022, BMW invested an additional $4.2 billion into the Chinese joint venture, increasing its stake from 50% to 75%, becoming one of the first foreign automakers holding majority stake in China. In June 2022, BMW announced a new plant project in Lydia, Shenyang designed for electric vehicles. It will become BMW Group's largest single project in China, costing 15 billion yuan (2.13 billion euros). The investment amount was raised by a further 10 billion yuan (US$1.4 billion) in November 2022, following German Chancellor Olaf Scholz's visit to China.

==== Hungary ====
On 31 July 2018, BMW announced to build a 1 billion euro car factory in Hungary. The plant, to be built near Debrecen, will have a production capacity of 150,000 cars a year.

==== Mexico ====
In July 2014, BMW announced it was establishing a plant in Mexico, in the city and state of San Luis Potosí involving an investment of $1 billion. The plant will employ 1,500 people, and produce 150,000 cars annually.

==== Netherlands ====
The Mini Convertible, Mini Countryman and BMW X1 were produced in the Netherlands at the VDL Nedcar factory in Born up until its closure on February 16, 2024. The factory was closed after BMW did not renew its contract with VDL Nedcar. Long-term orders for the Mini Countryman ended in 2020.

==== South Africa ====
BMWs have been assembled in South Africa since 1968, when Praetor Monteerders' plant was opened in Rosslyn, near Pretoria. BMW initially bought shares in the company, before fully acquiring it in 1975; in so doing, the company became BMW South Africa, the first wholly owned subsidiary of BMW to be established outside Germany. Unlike United States manufacturers, such as Ford and GM, which divested from the country in the 1980s, BMW retained full ownership of its operations in South Africa.

Following the end of apartheid in 1994, and the lowering of import tariffs, BMW South Africa ended local production of the 5 Series and 7 Series, in order to concentrate on production of the 3 Series for the export market. South African–built BMWs are now exported to right hand drive markets including Japan, Australia, New Zealand, the United Kingdom, Indonesia, Malaysia, Singapore, and Hong Kong, as well as Sub-Saharan Africa. Since 1997, BMW South Africa has produced vehicles in left-hand drive for export to Taiwan, the United States and Iran, as well as South America.

Three unique models that BMW Motorsport created for the South African market were the E23 M745i (1983), which used the M88 engine from the BMW M1, the BMW 333i (1986), which added a six-cylinder 3.2-litre M30 engine to the E30, and the E30 BMW 325is (1989) which was powered by an Alpina-derived 2.7-litre engine.

The plant code (position 11 in the VIN) for South African built models is "N".

==== United States ====
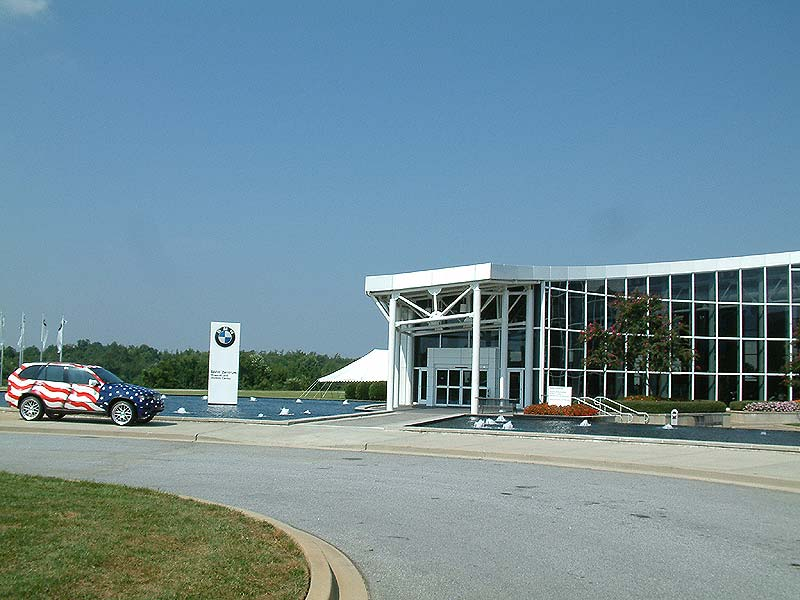
BMW Zentrum museum in Spartanburg, South Carolina

BMW cars have been officially sold in the United States since 1956 and manufactured in the United States since 1994. The first BMW dealership in the United States opened in 1975. In 2016, BMW was the twelfth highest selling brand in the United States.

The manufacturing plant in Greer, South Carolina has the highest production of the BMW plants worldwide, currently producing approximately 1,500 vehicles per day. The models produced at the Spartanburg plant are the X3, X4, X5, X6, X7 and XM SUV models.

In addition to the South Carolina manufacturing facility, BMW's North American companies include sales, marketing, design, and financial services operations in the United States, Mexico, Canada and Latin America.

=== Complete knock-down assembly facilities ===
==== Brazil ====
On 9 October 2014, BMW's new complete knock-down (CKD) assembly plant in Araquari, assembled its first car— an F30 3 Series.

The cars assembled at Araquari are the F20 1 Series, F30 3 Series, F48 X1, F25 X3 and Mini Countryman.

==== Egypt ====
Bavarian Auto Group became the importer of the BMW and Mini brands in 2003. Since 2005, the 3 Series, 5 Series, 7 Series, X1 and X3 models sold in Egypt are assembled from complete knock-down components at the BMW plant in Cairo.

==== India ====
BMW India was established in 2006 as a sales subsidiary with a head office located in Gurugram. A BMW complete knock-down assembly plant was opened in Chennai in 2007, assembling Indian-market 3 Series, 5 Series, 7 Series, X1, X3, X5, Mini Countryman and motorcycle models. The 20 Million Euro plant aims to produce 1,700 cars per year.

==== Indonesia ====
PT. BMW Indonesia was established in 2001 as a subsidiary with a head office located in Central Jakarta. It was managed by PT. Astra International. 10 years later in 2011, BMW Group invested more than 100 Billion Indonesian rupiah to expand its production, by establish the complete knock-down (CKD) assembly plant in Gaya Motor's production facility in Sunter, Jakarta. the plant is currently assembling Indonesian-market 2 Series (gran coupé), 3 Series (sedan), 5 Series (sedan), 7 Series, X1, X3, X5, X7, and Mini Countryman.

==== Malaysia ====
BMW's complete knock-down (CKD) assembly plant in Kedah. Assembled Malaysia-market 1 Series, 3 Series, 5 Series, 7 Series, X1, X3, X4, X5, X6 and Mini Countryman since 2008.

==== Russia ====
Russian-market 3 Series and 5 Series cars are assembled from complete knock-down components in Kaliningrad beginning in 1999. In March 2022, BMW withdrew from the Russian market, ceased new car sales in Russia, and ceased production within Russia, in response to the Russian invasion of Ukraine.

==== Uruguay ====
In Uruguay, Spanish-born businessman José Arijón founded Convex (later Camur), which assembled BMW cars from 1965 to 1992. Four models were produced: the 1600, 2002, 3 Series and 5 Series, totalling 12,000 units.

=== Vehicle importers ===
==== Canada ====
BMW's first dealership in Canada, located in Ottawa, was opened in 1969. In 1986, BMW established a head office in Canada. BMW sold 28,149 vehicles in Canada in 2008.

==== Japan ====
BMW Japan Corp, a wholly owned subsidiary, imports and distributes BMW vehicles in Japan.

==== Philippines ====
BMW Philippines, an owned subsidiary of San Miguel Corporation, is the official importer and distributor of BMW in the Philippines. BMW sold 920 vehicles in the Philippines in 2019.

==== Korea ====
BMW Korea imports BMW vehicles in South Korea with more than fifty service centers to fully cater to South Korean customers. BMW Korea has its own driving center near Incheon International Airport.

==== Singapore ====
BMW car represented almost 10% of all new cars registered in 2025, making it the third most popular car brand.

== Criticism ==
BMW has received criticism for attempting to lock vehicle hardware features behind subscription fees. In 2018, BMW stated at the Detroit Auto Show that it will start charging users a subscription fee for CarPlay. After receiving widespread criticism, BMW removed the subscription. In 2022, BMW announced that it will start charging owners $18 a month to use heated seats. It removed the feature in 2023 after it was criticised.

From 27 July to 10 August 2026, as part of a wider marketing agreement with Sony Pictures and Marvel Studios, BMW ran a promotional animation for the film Spider-Man: Brand New Day on "suitably equipped" cars built after July 2020 and running BMW operating systems 7 and onwards, issued via an over-the-air update in 70 countries, contradicting earlier comments by BMW's senior vice president for connected company development Stephen Durach, who said that he did not see BMW selling advertising space as the cabin is "a private space". The move was criticised by owners and journalists online that saw it as an intrusion to owners' personal space and detracting from the ownership experience. Various commenters compared the incident to the controversial 2014 release of U2's album Songs of Innocence to all iTunes Store users.

== See also ==
- BMW Group Classic
- List of BMW engines
- List of automotive manufacturers by production
