= OPF =

OPF may refer to:

== Science and technology ==
- Gasoline particulate filter (German: Ottopartikelfilter Otto particle filter), capturing soot particles from the petrol engine exhaust gases
- OEB Package Format, an eBook format
- OpenProject Foundation, the foundation for the open source web-based application OpenProject, registered 2012 in Berlin, Germany
- Optimal power flow, a technique used to simulate load flow through an AC power system

== Other uses ==
- Miami-Opa Locka Executive Airport (IATA and FAA LID: OPF), Florida, US
- Oceania Pickleball Federation, a "continental" sport oversight organization
- Operation Project Freedom, a 2026 United States military operation
- Orbiter Processing Facility, a class of hangars at Kennedy Space Center, Florida, US
