= BMW 1 Series (F40) =

Third generation of BMW 1 Series

BMW 1 Series (third generation)
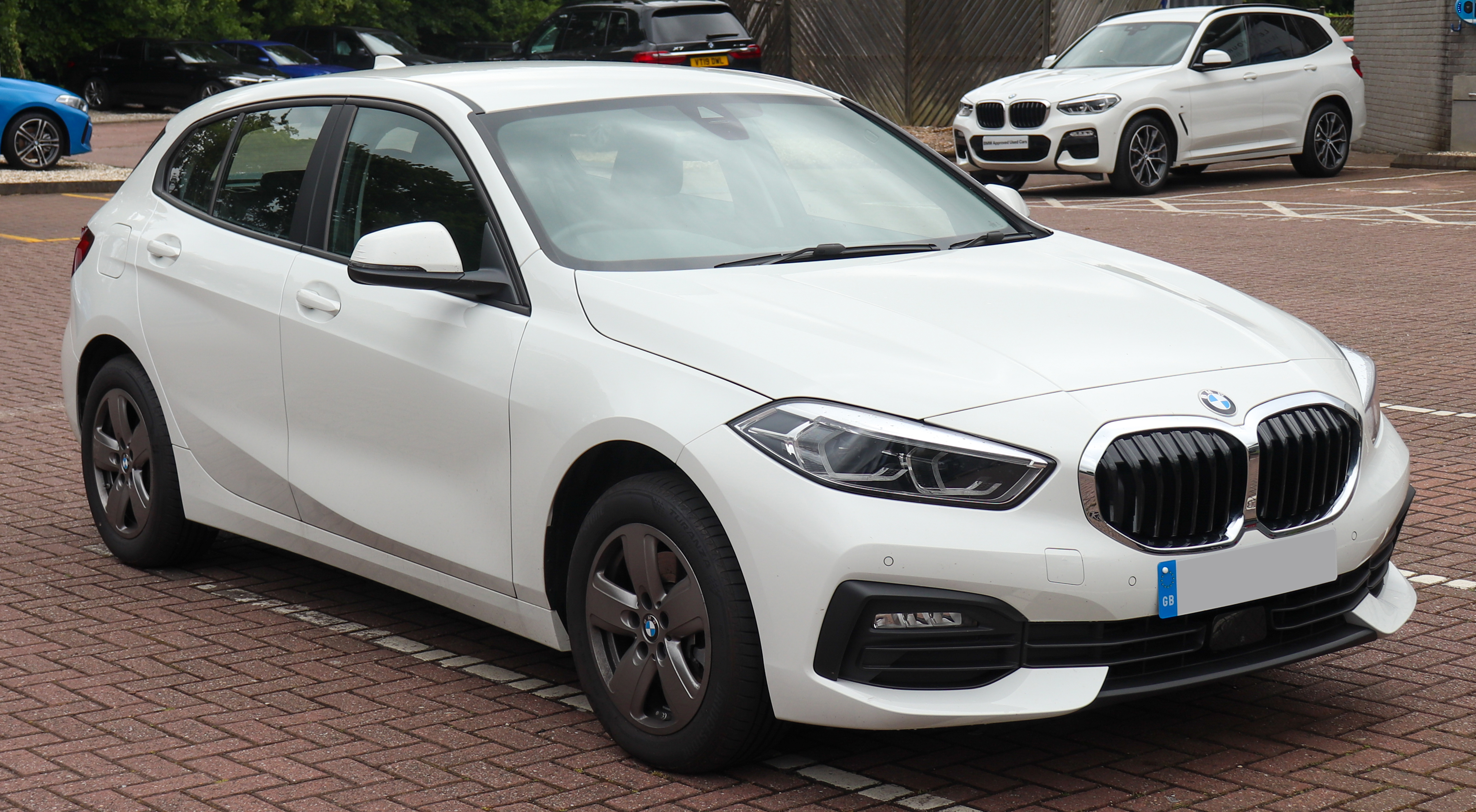
- 2019 BMW 118i SE

Overview
- Manufacturer: BMW
- Model code: F40
- Production: July 2019 – 2024
- Model years: 2020–2024
- Assembly: Germany: Leipzig (BMW Leipzig Plant); Regensburg
- Designer: Sebastian Simm

Body and chassis
- Class: Subcompact executive car
- Body style: 5-door hatchback
- Layout: Front-engine, front-wheel-drive; Front-engine, all-wheel-drive (xDrive)
- Platform: BMW UKL2 platform
- Related: BMW 2 Series Gran Coupé (F44)

Powertrain
- Engine: Petrol: 1.5 L B38 I3 turbo; 2.0 L B48 I4 turbo; Diesel: 1.5 L B37 I3 turbo; 2.0 L B47 I4 turbo
- Transmission: 6-speed Getrag manual; 8-speed Aisin AWF8F35 automatic; 7-speed Getrag / Magna 7DCT300 M-DCT dual-clutch

Dimensions
- Wheelbase: 2,670 mm (105.1 in)
- Length: 4,319 mm (170.0 in)
- Width: 1,799 mm (70.8 in)
- Height: 1,434 mm (56.5 in)
- Kerb weight: 1,290–1,525 kg (2,844–3,362 lb)

Chronology
- Predecessor: BMW 1 Series (F20)
- Successor: BMW 1 Series (F70)

The BMW 1 Series (F40) is the third generation of the BMW 1 Series range of subcompact executive hatchback cars. Unlike the previous generation F20 1 Series, the F40 1 Series uses a front-wheel drive configuration and is only available as a 5-door hatchback.

== Overview ==
The F40 1 Series premiered at the 2019 Frankfurt Auto Show and launched on 28 September 2019. Built on the UKL2 platform, it shares the same front hood, fender panel, dashboard, and suspension as the 2 Series Gran Coupé.

Compared to its predecessor, the F40 1 Series is 5 mm (0.2 in) shorter, 34 mm (1.3 in) wider, and 13 mm (0.5 in) taller. Despite the decreases in length, due to the tighter packaging of the front-wheel drive engine, front legroom has increased by 42 mm (1.7 in), rear legroom has increased by 33 mm (1.3 in), and rear headroom has increased by 19 mm (0.7 in). The boot capacity has also increased by 20 litres (0.71 cu ft) to 380 litres (13 cu ft) with the seats raised, and 1,200 litres (42 cu ft) with the seats folded. The F40 1 Series is also 30 kg (66 lb) lighter due to increased use of aluminium.

Petrol engines have a gasoline particulate filter, while diesel engines feature a diesel particulate filter and AdBlue selective catalytic reduction. All engines meet the Euro 6d-TEMP emissions standard.

116i, 118i, 116d, and 118d models come with 6-speed manual transmissions as standard. 118i and 116d models can be specified with a 7-speed Getrag 7DCT300 dual-clutch transmission, while an 8-speed Aisin automatic transmission is available for M135i xDrive, 128ti, 118d, and 120d xDrive models.

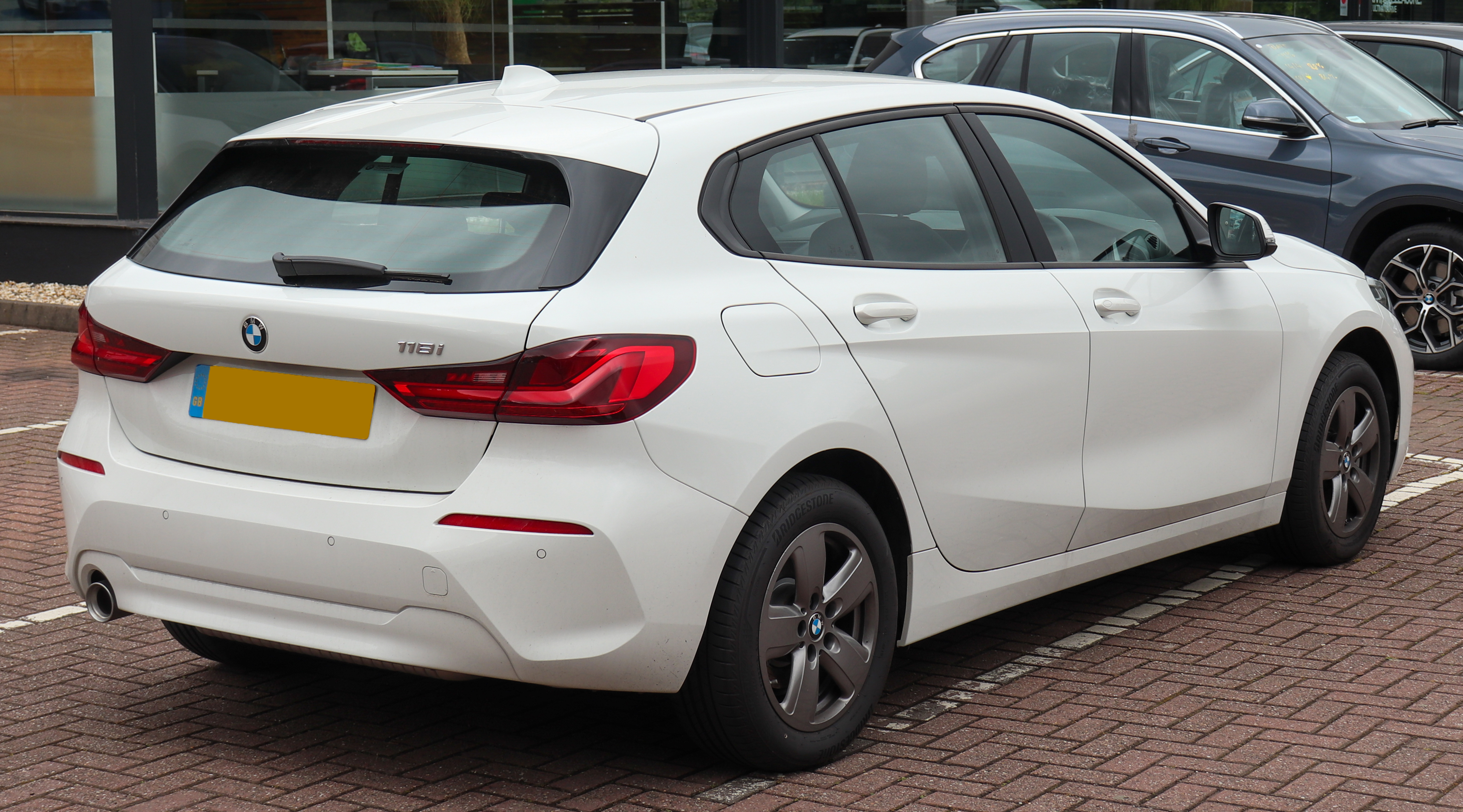
2019 BMW 118i SE

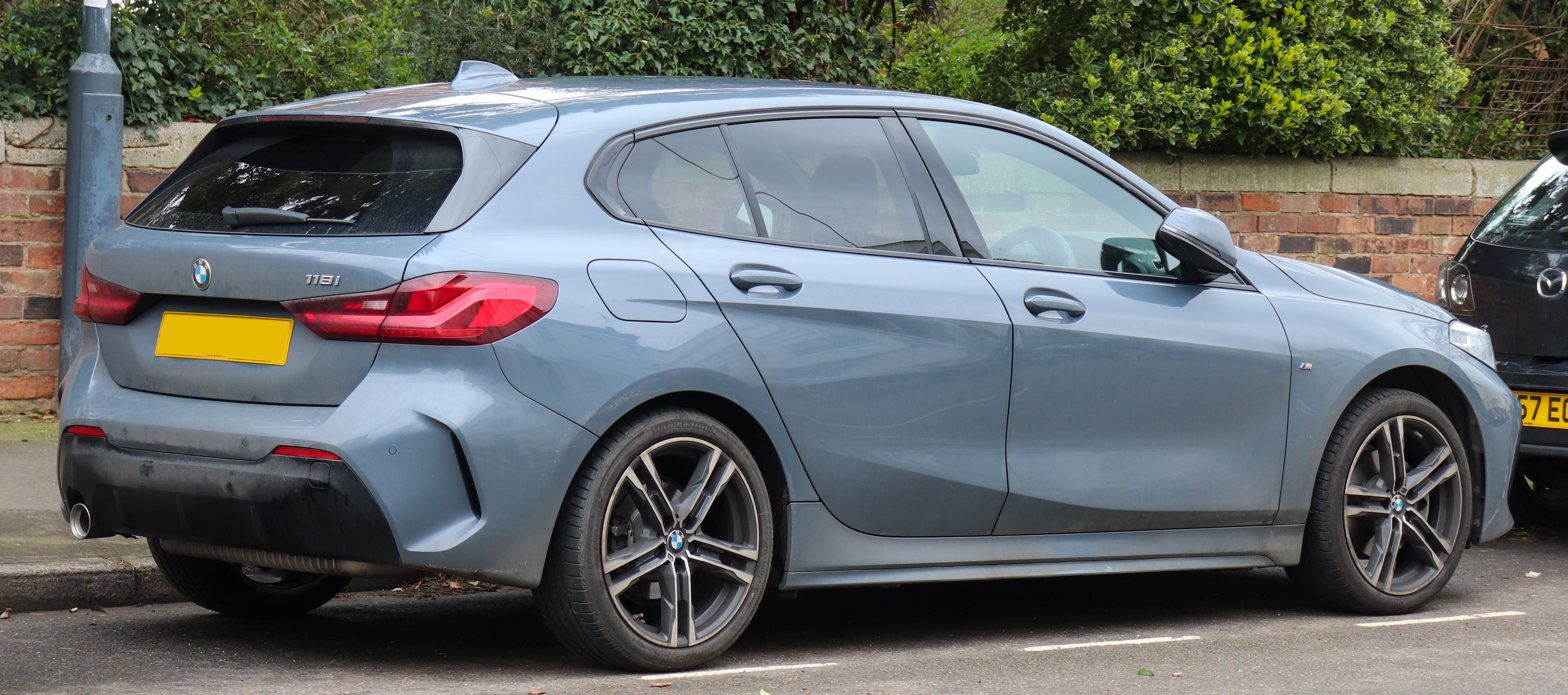
2019 BMW 118i M Sport

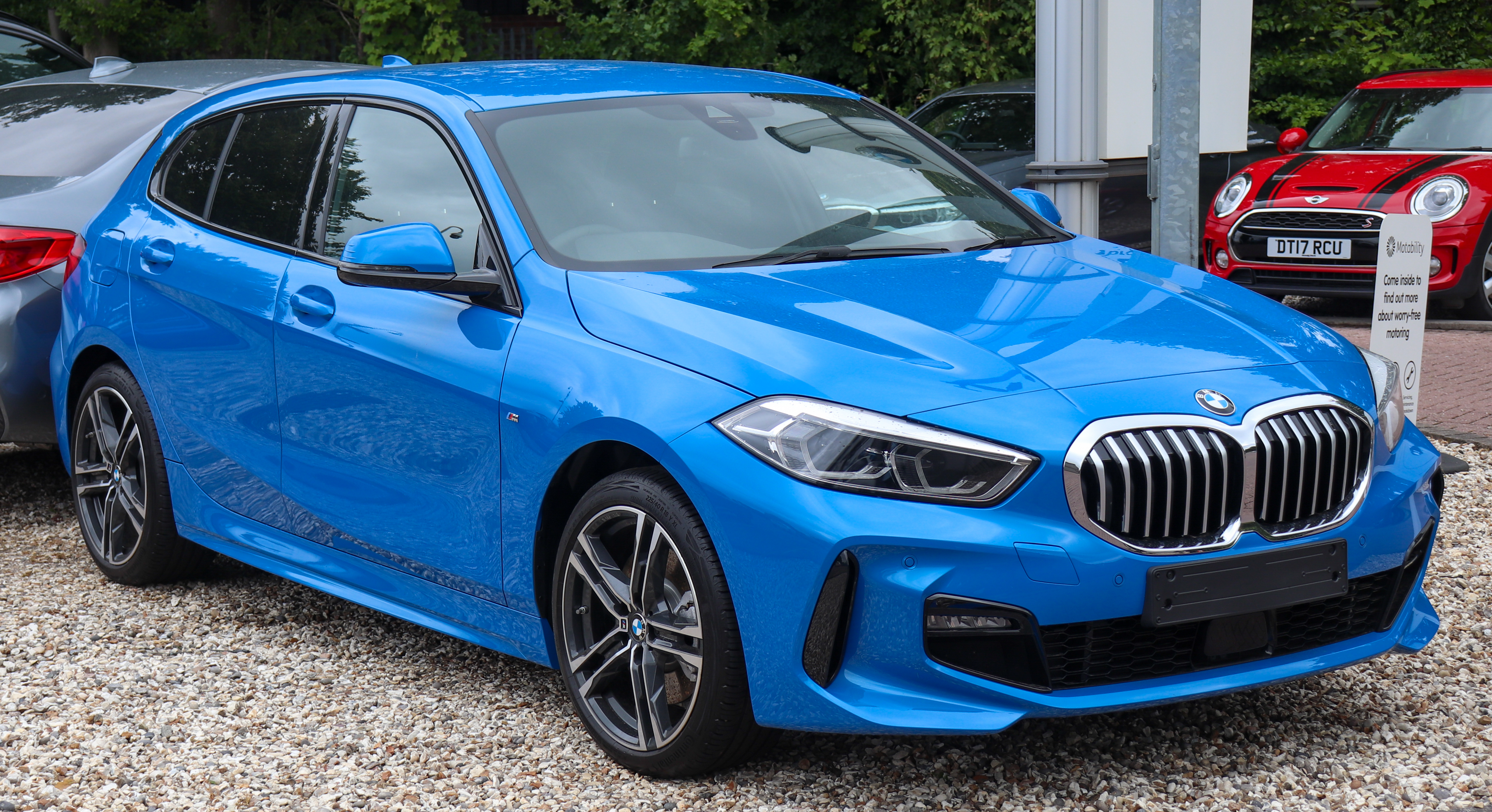
2020 BMW 118i M Sport

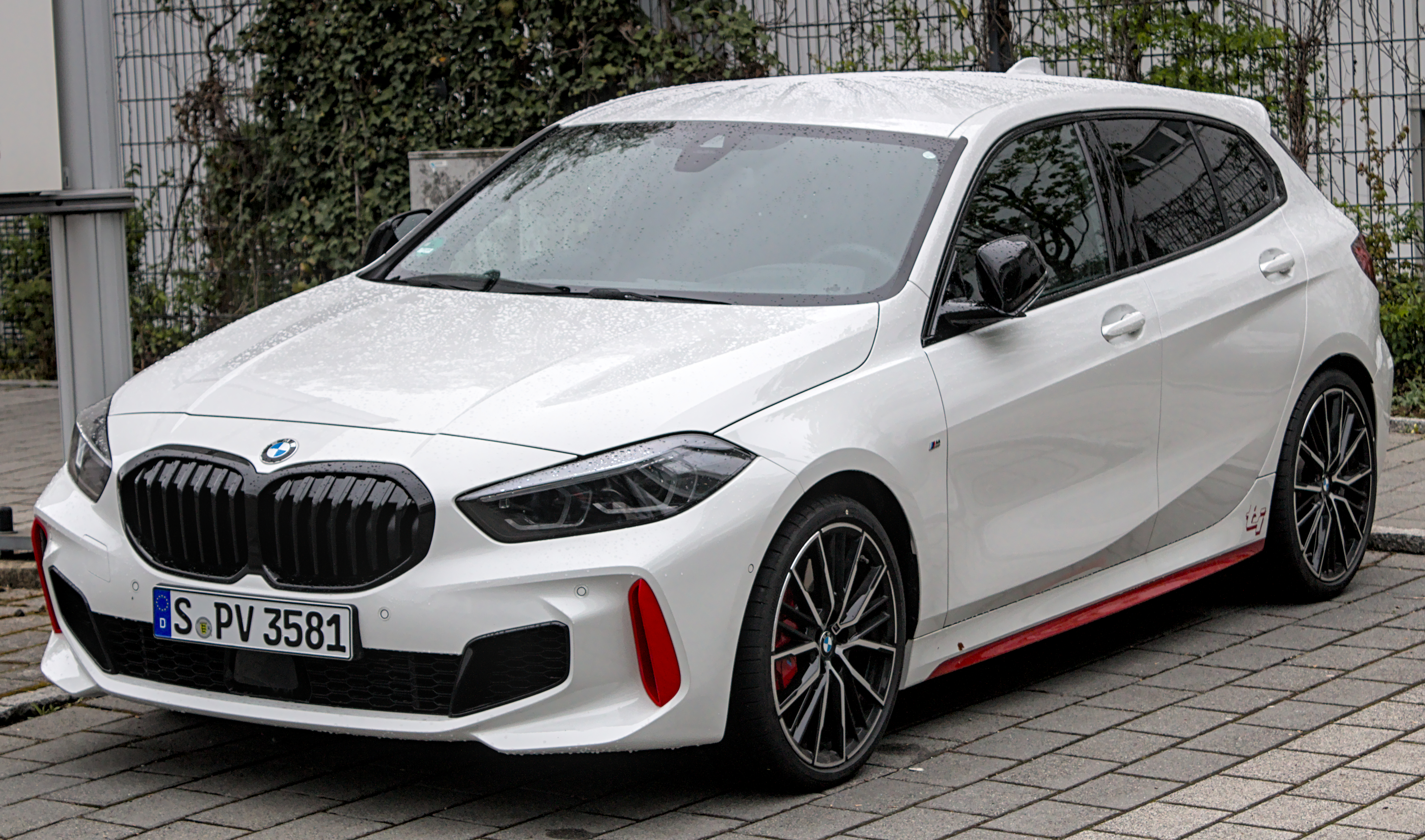
2021 BMW 128ti

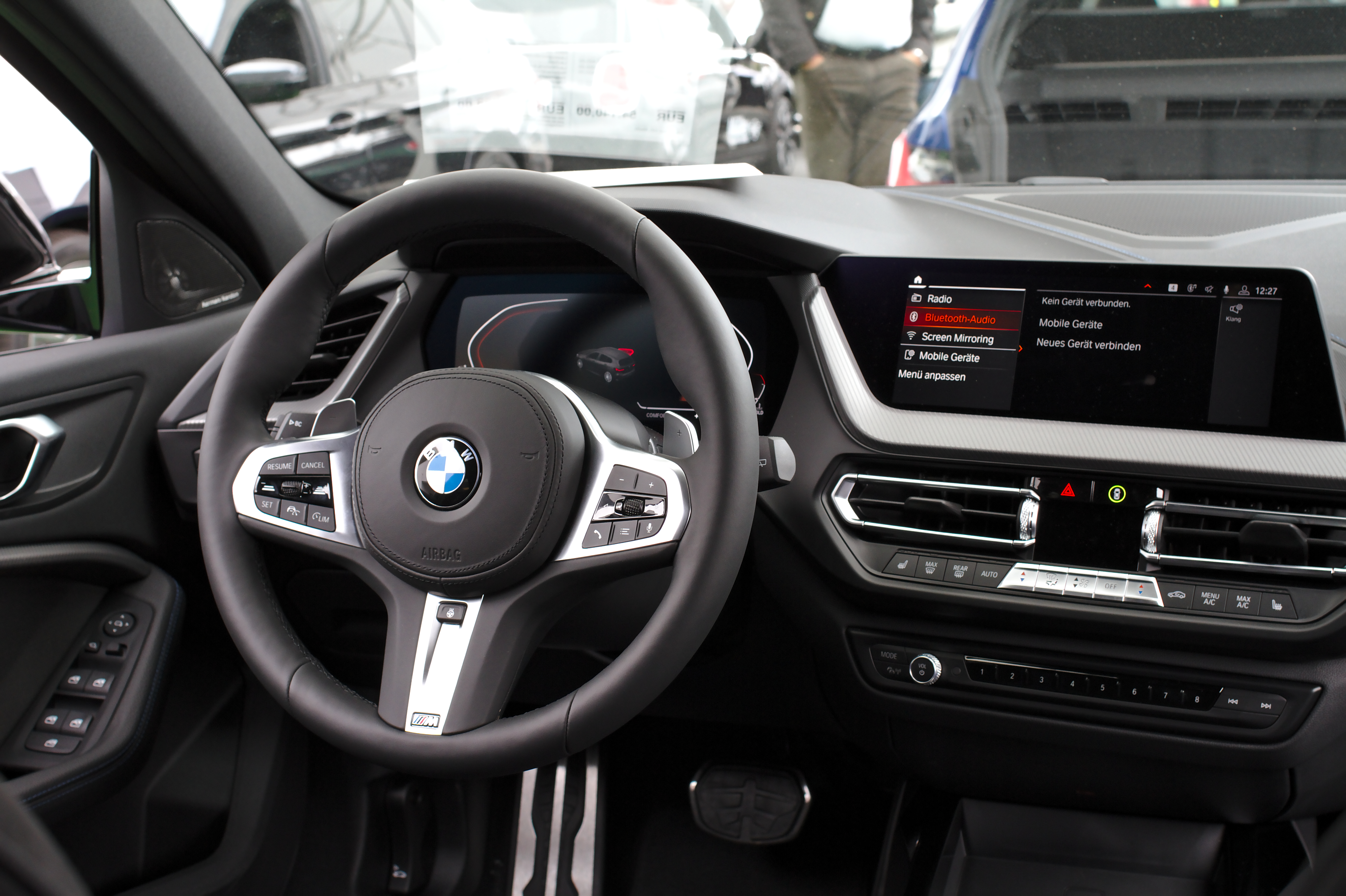
Interior

== Equipment ==
The F40 1 Series is available in Advantage, Luxury, Sport, and M Sport trim. Sport and Luxury models feature an M Sport Steering wheel, while M Sport models feature sport seats and M exterior styling. European models feature collision detection and lane departure warning with intervention as standard.

The F40 1 Series is available with iDrive 7.0 with two 10.25-inch displays. iDrive 7.0 features the voice-controlled BMW digital assistant which can control in-car functions and can be activated by saying "Hey BMW". A digital key also enables the vehicle to be unlocked using near-field communication by holding a smartphone near the door handle and the engine can be started by placing the smartphone in the wireless charging tray. The digital key can also be shared with up to five other smartphones.

Other options include gesture control, a windshield reflected head-up display, automatic parking, a panoramic sunroof, Apple CarPlay and Android Auto.

128ti and M135i xDrive models feature a limited-slip differential, larger M Sport brakes, a strut bar, and a larger 100 mm (3.9 in) diameter exhaust.

== Updates ==
In October 2021 BMW revealed an updated M135i. It comes with retuned springs, dampers and trailing arm and control arm mounts. A hydromount was also added to attach the front wishbones and the camber has been increased for more grip. The artificial interior engine sound was loudened as well.

== Models ==
=== Petrol engines ===
Model	Years	Engine	Transmission	Layout	Power	Torque	0–100 km/h (0–62 mph)
116i	2020–2024	B38A15 1.5 L I3 turbo	6 speed manual Getrag 7 speed DCT Getrag/ Magna 7DCT300 M-DCT dual-clutch	Front-wheel-drive	80 kW (107 hp) at 4,600–6,500 rpm	190 N⋅m (140 lb⋅ft) at 1,380–3,800 rpm	10.8 s
118i	2019–2024	B38A15 1.5 L I3 turbo	6 speed manual Getrag 7 speed DCT Getrag/ Magna 7DCT300 M-DCT dual-clutch	Front-wheel-drive	103 kW (138 hp) at 4,600–6,500 rpm	220 N⋅m (162 lb⋅ft) at 1,480–4,200 rpm	8.5 s
120i	2020–2024	B48A20 2.0 L I4 turbo	7 speed DCT Getrag/ Magna 7DCT300 M-DCT dual-clutch	Front-wheel-drive	131 kW (176 hp) at 5,000–6,500 rpm	280 N⋅m (207 lb⋅ft) at 1,350–4,200 rpm	7.1 s
128ti	2020–2024	B48A20 2.0 L I4 turbo	8 speed automatic Aisin AWF8F35	Front-wheel-drive	195 kW (261 hp) at 4,750–6,500 rpm	400 N⋅m (295 lb⋅ft) at 1,750–4,500 rpm	6.1 s
M135i xDrive	2019–2024	B48A20 2.0 L I4 turbo	8 speed automatic Aisin AWF8F35	All-wheel-drive	225 kW (302 hp) at 5,000–6,500 rpm	450 N⋅m (332 lb⋅ft) at 1,750–4,500 rpm	4.8 s

=== Diesel engines ===
Model	Years	Engine	Transmission	Layout	Power	Torque	0-100 km/h (0-62 mph)
116d	2019–2024	B37C15U0 1.5 L I3 turbo	6 speed manual Getrag 7 speed DCT	Front-wheel-drive	85 kW (114 hp) at 4,000 rpm	270 N⋅m (199 lb⋅ft) at 1,750–2,250 rpm	10.3 s
118d	2019–2024	B47D20 2.0 L I4 turbo	6 speed manual Getrag 8 speed automatic Aisin AWF8F35	Front-wheel-drive	110 kW (148 hp) at 4,000 rpm	350 N⋅m (258 lb⋅ft) at 1,750–2,500 rpm	8.5 s
120d	2019–2024	B47D20 2.0 L I4 turbo	8-speed automatic Aisin AWF8F35	Front-wheel-drive; All-wheel-drive	140 kW (188 hp) at 4,000 rpm	400 N⋅m (295 lb⋅ft) at 1,750–2,500 rpm	7.0 s

== Safety ==
ANCAP test results BMW 1 Series all variants (2019, aligned with Euro NCAP)
Test	Points	%
Overall:	5 /5 stars	
Adult occupant:	31.7	83%
Child occupant:	43.8	89%
Pedestrian:	36.5	76%
Safety assist:	9.6	73%

The 2019 1 Series scored five stars overall in its Euro NCAP test.

Euro NCAP test results BMW 118i, LHD (2019)
Test	Points	%
Overall:	5 /5 stars	
Adult occupant:	31.8	83%
Child occupant:	43	87%
Pedestrian:	36.5	76%
Safety assist:	9.5	72%
