= Particulate filter =

Particulate filter may refer to:

- HEPA filter, for filtering particulates out of indoor air
- Mechanical filter (respirator), a wearable filter
- Diesel particulate filter, used in diesel engines
- Gasoline particulate filter, used in gasoline engines
