= M135 =

M135 may refer to:

- BMW 1 Series (F70)
- GMC M135, truck
- H-33 (Michigan county highway), previously designated "M-135"
- M135, American version of the Royal Ordnance L9
