= BMW 4 Series (G22) =

Second generation of BMW 4 Series

BMW 4 Series (G22/G23/G26)
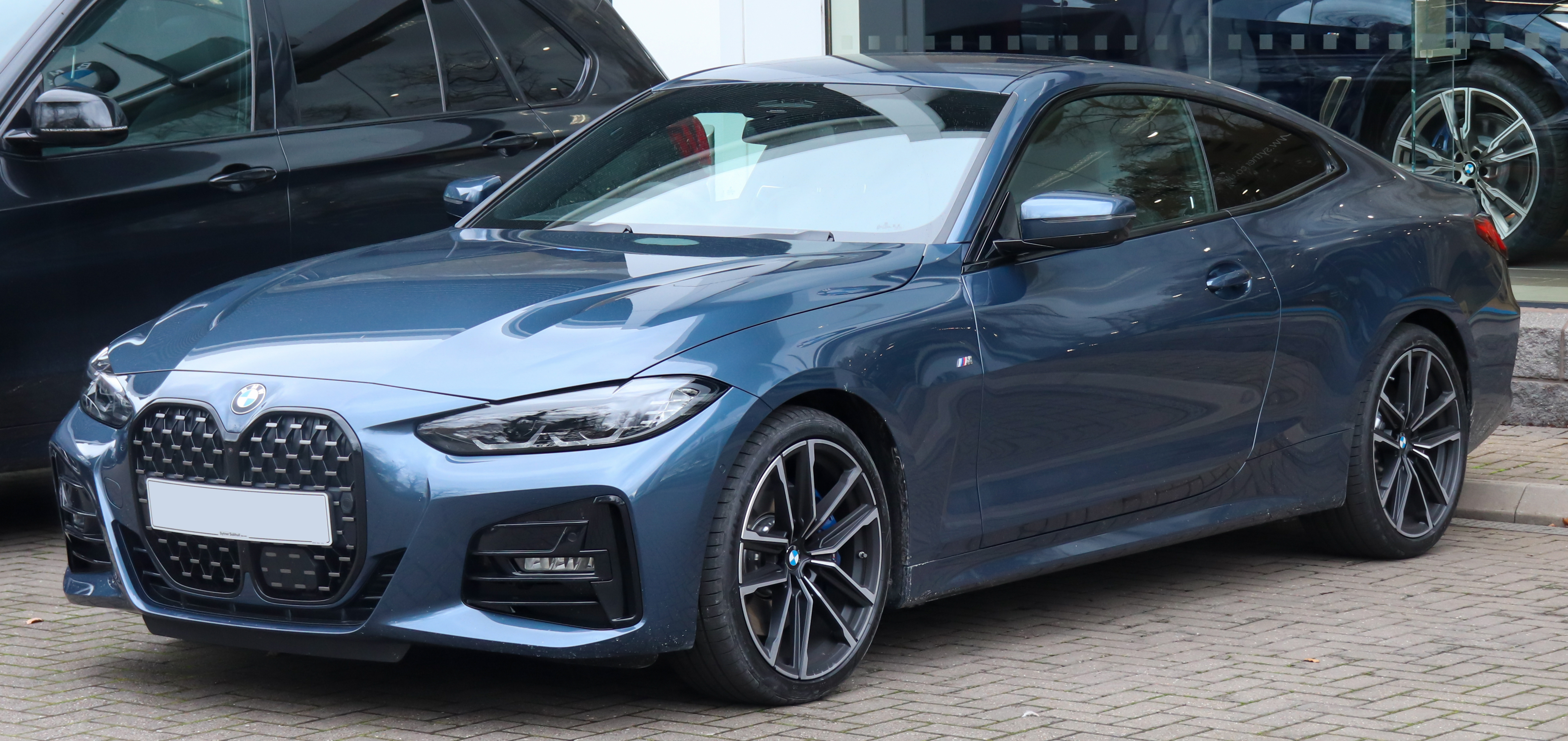

Overview
- Manufacturer: BMW
- Production: 2020–present
- Assembly: Germany: Dingolfing (Coupé and Convertible); Munich (Gran Coupé)
- Designer: Seungmo Lim (concept & production versions)

Body and chassis
- Class: Compact executive car (D)
- Body style: 2-door coupé (G22); 2-door convertible (G23); 5-door liftback (G26, Gran Coupé)
- Layout: Front-engine, rear-wheel-drive / all-wheel-drive (xDrive)
- Platform: BMW CLAR
- Related: BMW M4 (G82/G83); BMW i4 BMW 3 Series (G20/G21); BMW 2 Series (G42)

Powertrain
- Engine: Petrol: 2.0 L B48 turbo I4; 3.0 L B58 turbo I6 (Mild Hybrid); Diesel: 2.0 L B47 turbo I4 (Mild hybrid); 3.0 L B57 turbo I6
- Transmission: 6-speed manual (M4 only); 8-speed ZF 8HP automatic
- Hybrid drivetrain: Mild hybrid: I4 turbodiesel + 48V electric motor; I6 turbo + 48V electric motor

Dimensions
- Wheelbase: 2,851 mm (112.2 in)
- Length: 4,768 mm (187.7 in)
- Width: 1,852 mm (72.9 in)
- Height: 1,387 mm (54.6 in)
- Curb weight: 1,600–2,290 kg (3,527–5,049 lb)

Chronology
- Predecessor: BMW 4 Series (F32); BMW 3 Series Gran Turismo (F34) (4 Series Gran Coupé)

The second generation of the BMW 4 Series consists of the BMW G22 (coupé version) along with the BMW G23 (convertible version) and BMW G26 (5-door liftback version, marketed as the Gran Coupé) compact executive cars. The G22 4 Series was launched in June 2020 for the 2021 model year and succeeds the F32 4 Series.

The G22 is produced alongside - and shares many features with - the G20 3 Series. As with the G20 3 Series range, the 4 Series are powered by turbocharged petrol and diesel engines. Unlike its predecessor, the new 4 Series has a significant departure in design from the 3 Series in order to distinguish between the two models and to move the 4 Series upscale. The most notable of the design changes are the large kidney grilles at the front, inspired by the 1930s BMW 328, which were notably controversial among critics.

== Development ==
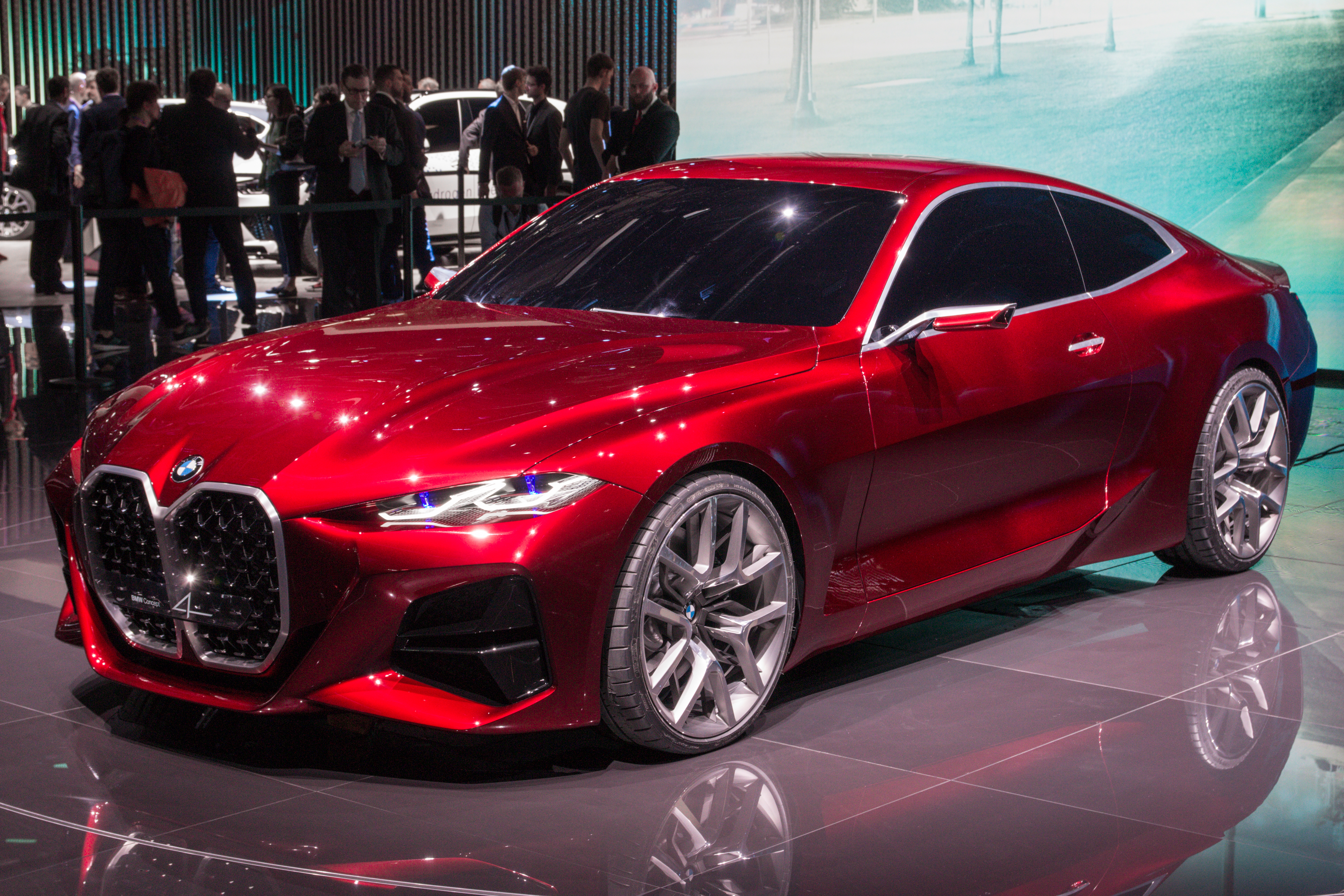
BMW Concept 4 at the 2019 Frankfurt Motor Show

The G22 4 Series was unveiled in concept form as the BMW Concept 4 at the 2019 Frankfurt Motor Show, previewing the next generation of the 4 Series. The most notable design feature are the large vertical kidney grilles, which are inspired by the BMW 328 and 3.0 CSi respectively. The grille has a 3D pattern design to give it a more pronounced look. Other notable design features of the concept were a pronounced duck-tail spoiler at the rear, thin wing mirrors made from a single piece of aluminium and open headlamps, which have no covering over their 3D lighting elements and are instead embedded into the body of the car.

== Launch ==
On 26 May 2020, BMW announced that the G22 4 Series would be unveiled online in June 2020 by posting a teaser image of the range-topping M440i model. More than 80% of the design cues from the Concept 4 were carried over to the production version including the large kidney grille which now has mesh inserts and is flanked with two slim LED headlamps and two large air intakes (exclusive for the M440i). The rear features wrap around tail lamps and a lip spoiler which is exclusive for the M Sport models. The silhouette of the car is similar to the 8 Series with a tapering roof line. The rear bumper comes with a diffuser on the M Sport models with the M440i having dual exhaust tips. The production version is claimed to have a drag area as low as 0.25 x 2.19 m^{2} for the Coupé. On the online unveiling, BMW announced that the worldwide launch of the G22 4 Series would be held in October of the same year.

At the end of September, BMW unveiled the convertible version of the new 4 Series (G23), with the same technology and engines as the coupe. It has a canvas roof, unlike the two predecessors which had a retractable hardtop.

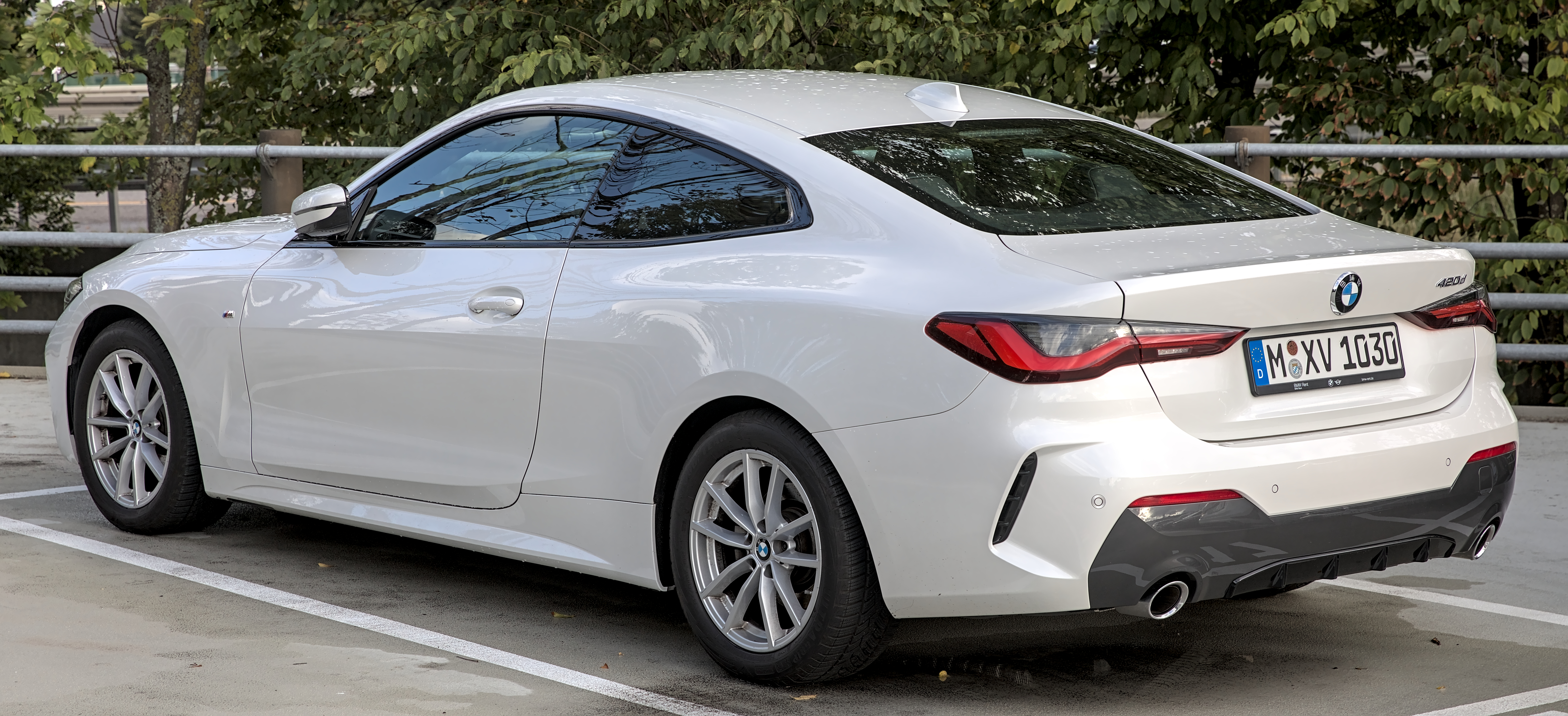
420d coupé (rear)

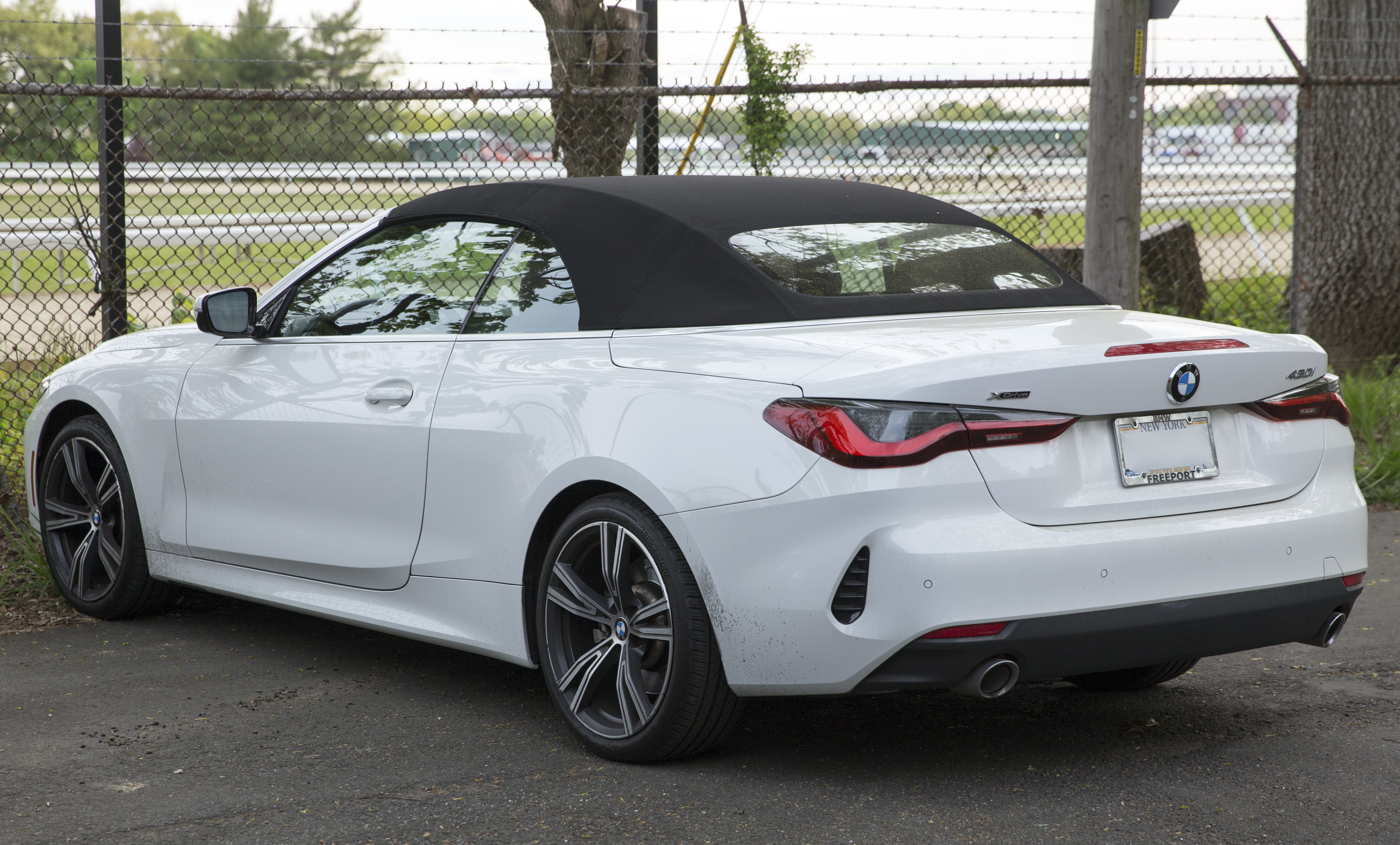
430i convertible (rear) (US)

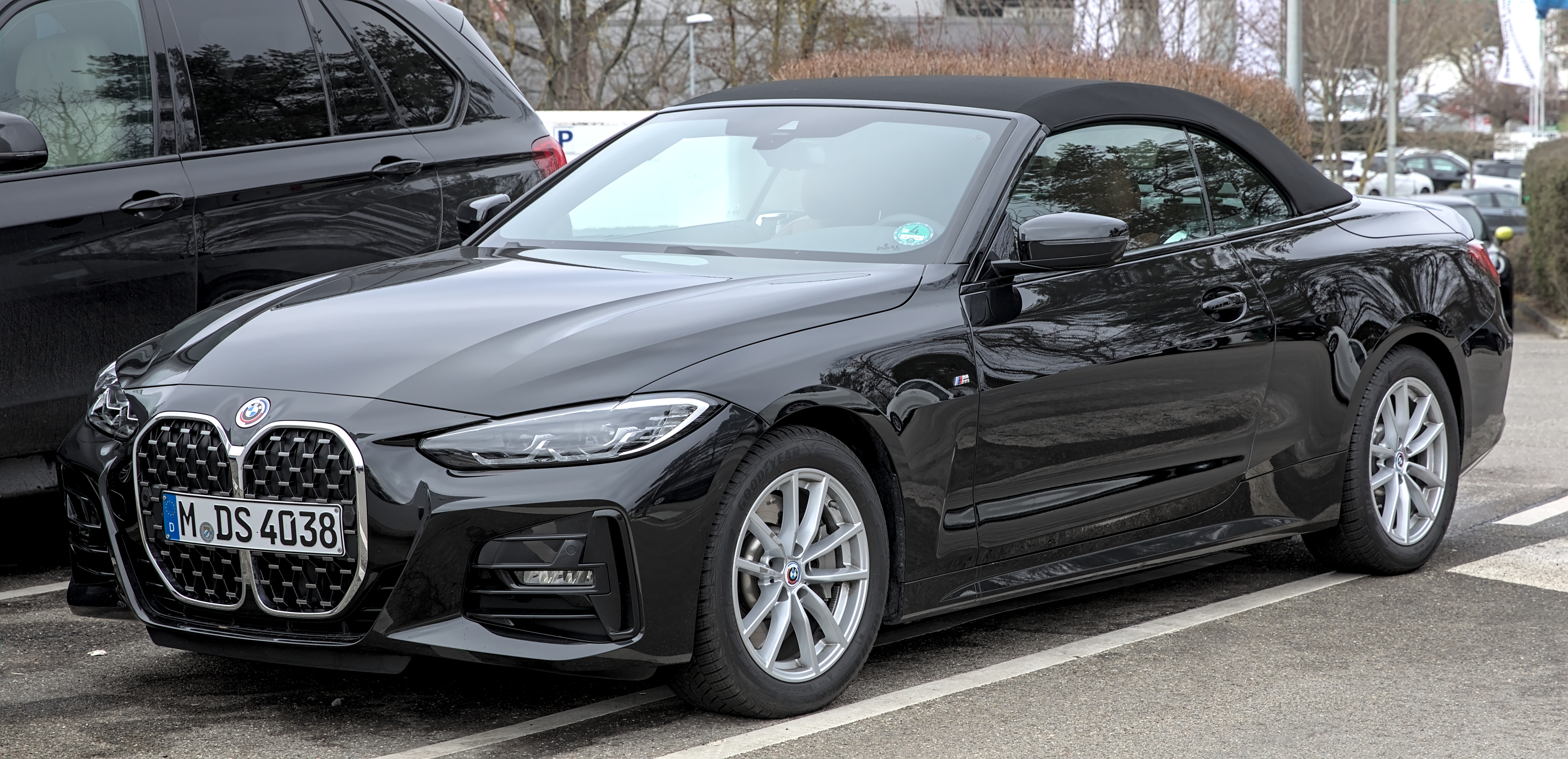
4 Series convertible

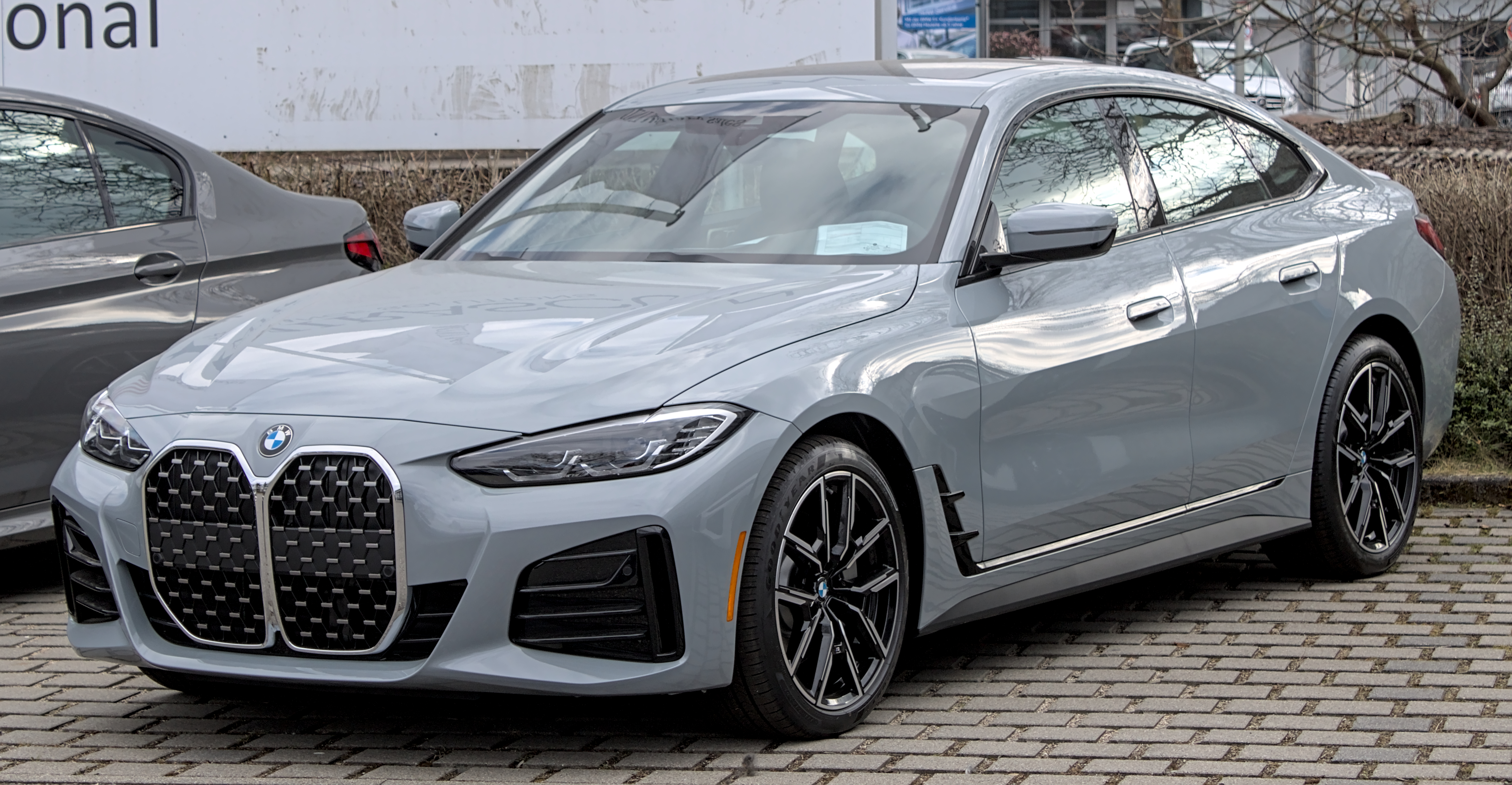
4 Series Gran Coupé

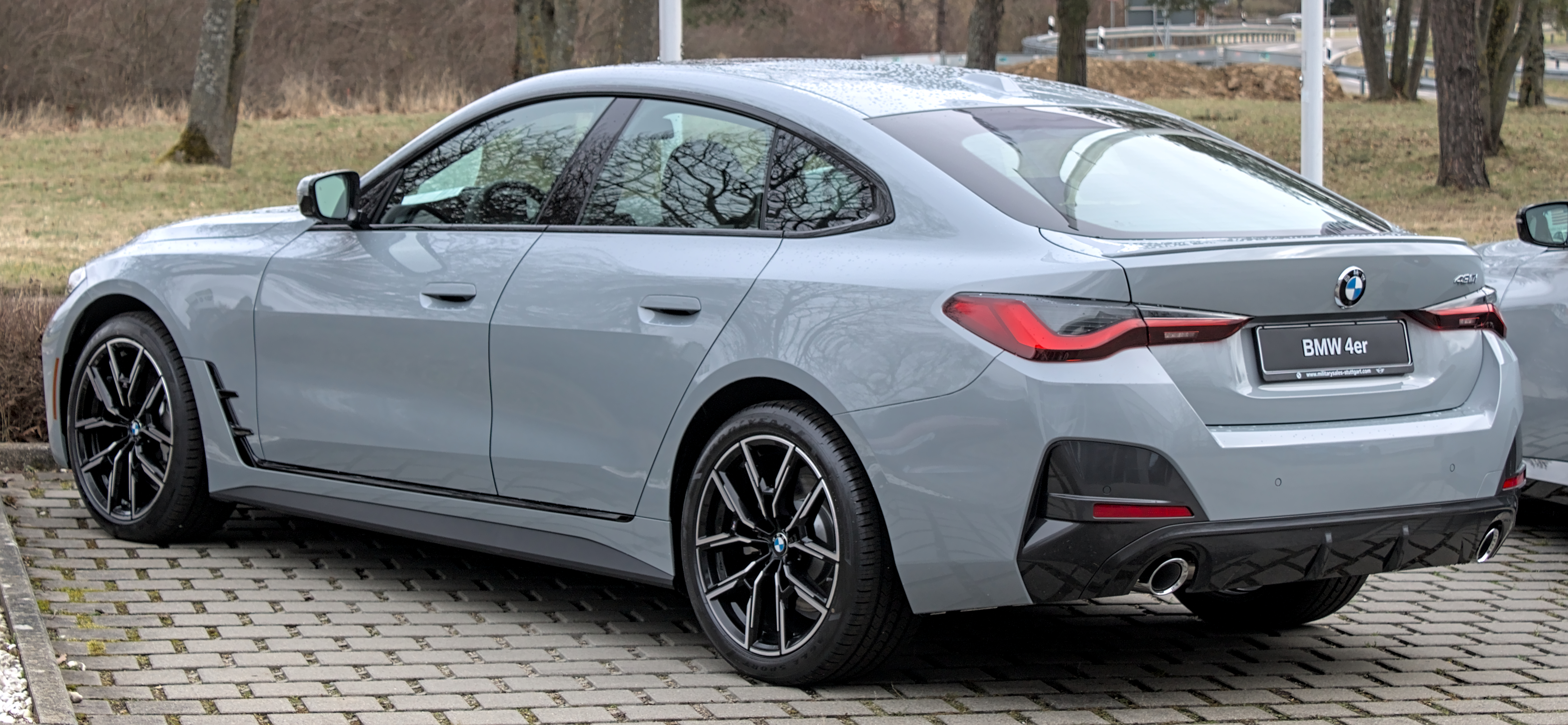
4 Series Gran Coupé (rear)

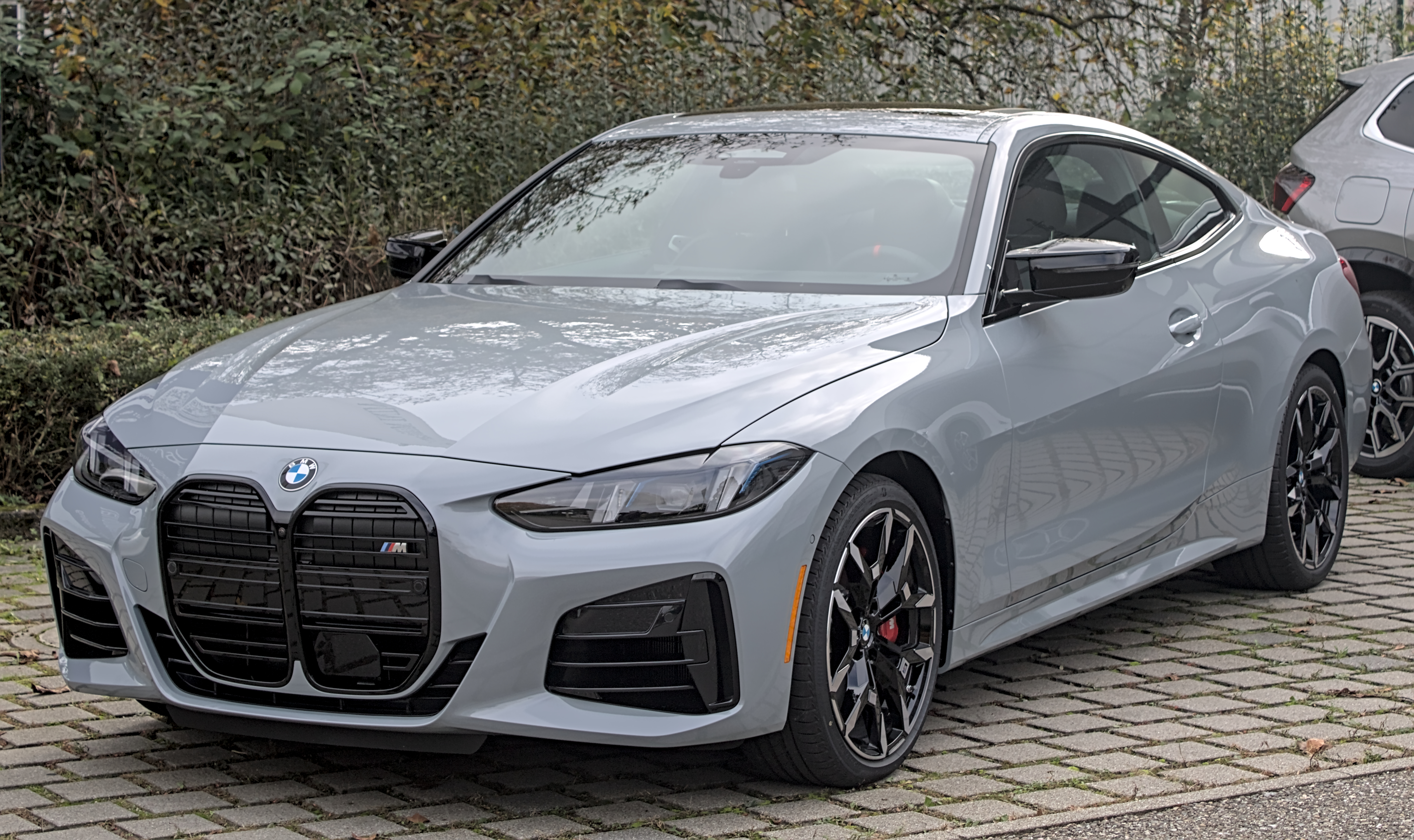
G22 Facelift

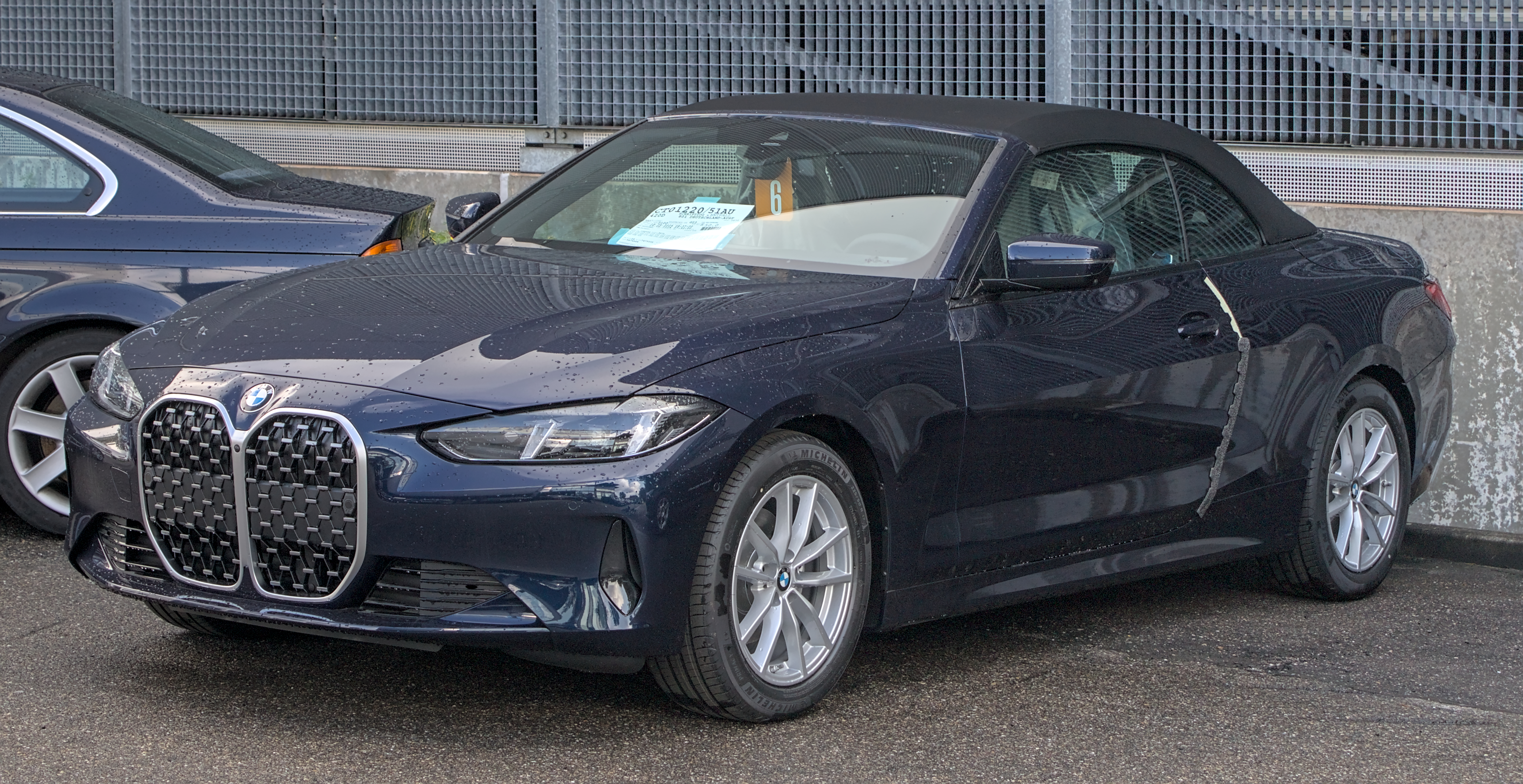
G23 Facelift

== Models ==
The launch models consist of the diesel engine 420d, 430d, and M440d, the petrol-engined 420i M Sport and 430i and the mild hybrid M440i xDrive. The 420i M Sport and 430i feature the 2.0-litre BMW B48 inline-four rated at 135 kW (181 hp) and 300 N⋅m (221 lb⋅ft) of torque for the 420i M Sport, and 190 kW (255 hp) and 399 N⋅m (294 lb⋅ft) of torque for the 430i. The M440i model is powered by the 3.0-litre turbocharged BMW B58 inline-6 engine rated at 285 kW (382 hp) and 500 N⋅m (369 lb⋅ft) of torque equipped with a 48-volt electric motor rated at 8 kW (11 hp). The 420d is powered by the 2.0-litre turbo-diesel BMW B47 inline-4 engine rated at 138 kW (185 hp) while the 430d and M440d are equipped with the 3.0-litre turbo-diesel BMW B57 inline-6 engine rated at 207 kW (278 hp) for the 430d and 246 kW (330 hp) for the 440d. The M440d, like the M440i, is also equipped with a mild hybrid system. The hybrid system features a belt-fed starter generator to recoup energy under braking. This power can be supplied to the car’s 12V electrical system or deployed to assist the combustion engine to help reduce CO_{2} emissions and boost fuel economy.

A previously unavailable combination of the 430i with xDrive in their Gran Coupé body will be available as a MY23 version becoming the first 2023 model other than their "iX" electrified SUV. Options like a Harman Kardon stereo upgrade, heads-up display, and LASER headlights are also available.

The only available gearbox is an 8-speed automatic transmission. The M Sport models come with a modified gearbox which features faster shifts and a new "Sprint" driving mode. The 430i, 420d, 430d and M440d come standard with rear-wheel-drive but can be configured with all-wheel-drive. The M440i comes with all wheel drive only. The G22 4 series has a wider track than its predecessor and has 50/50 weight distribution.

=== Performance ===
The 420i can accelerate from 0–100 km/h (62 mph) in 7.5 seconds, the 430i can accelerate from 0–97 km/h (60 mph) in 5.5 seconds (5.3 seconds for the xDrive version) while the M440i can accelerate from 0–100 km/h (62 mph) in 4.3 seconds. All models have an electronically limited top speed of 250 km/h (155 mph).

== Equipment ==
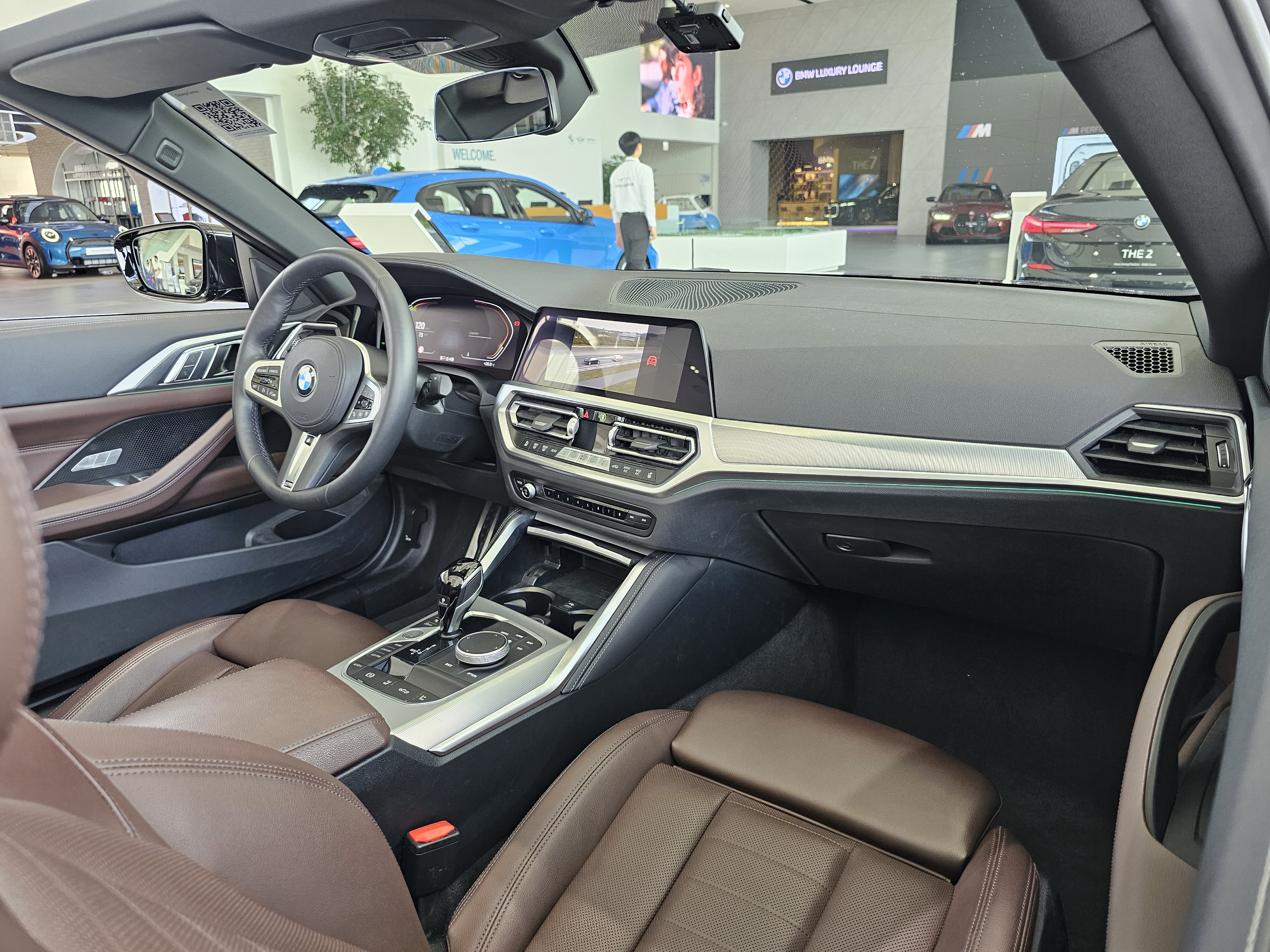
Interior (pre-Facelift)

The 4 Series comes with various exterior packages, such as the M Sport package which adds high gloss exterior trim pieces, a carbon fibre detailing pack which replaces the high gloss trim with carbon fibre and an M Sport Pro package which adds more high gloss trim pieces and 19 inch wheels, unique interior trim and exterior colours. The 4 Series comes standard with the M Sport suspension but buyers can also have the M Adaptive suspension as an option which tweaks steering, damping, and accelerator response. Laser headlamps are also optional aside from the adaptive LED headlamps with hexagonal lighting technology.

Most of the interior is carried over from the G20 3 Series upholstered in SensaTec faux leather with front sports seat being standard. The interior is offered in five colours with full leather upholstery being optional. The rear seats fold down to provide a total boot capacity of 440 L (15.5 cu ft). The iDrive 7.0 system is standard and features an 8.8-inch screen on the centre console along with a 5.1-inch screen in the instrument cluster. A 10.3 inch screen for the infotainment system along with a 12.3 inch screen for the instrument cluster are optional. The iDrive 7.0 has over-the-air updates for the navigational maps and operating system, and features a voice-controlled digital assistant. The 4 Series comes standard with the BMW navigation, the next-generation BMW head-up display, which has a 70 percent larger projection surface, and 3D environment visualization within the digital instrument cluster. Apple Car Play and Android Auto are also standard interior amenities. A Driving Assistance Professional package is optional, which adds adaptive cruise control with stop and go, lane-keep assist with side collision avoidance, and rear automatic emergency braking.

420-430 models with the M Sport trim and M440 models can be fitted with M Performance Parts. These include a splitter, canards, a lip spoiler, larger wheels and side skirts.

== Engines ==
Performance figures refer to rear-wheel drive coupés (G22); numbers in brackets are for xDrive coupés.

=== Petrol ===
Model	Years	Engine	Power	Torque	0–100 km/h (0–62 mph)
420i 420i xDrive	2021–present	2.0 L turbo I4; B48B20M0	135 kW (184 PS; 181 hp) at 4,400–6,000 rpm	300 N⋅m (221 ft⋅lb) at 1,250–4,300 rpm	7.5 seconds
430i 430i xDrive	2021-present	2.0 L turbo I4; B48B20O1	190 kW (258 PS; 255 hp) at 5,000-6,500 rpm	400 N⋅m (295 ft⋅lb) at 1,550-4,400 rpm	5.8 seconds
M440i; M440i xDrive	2021-present	3.0 L turbo I6; B58B30TÜ1 (Note: US engine code is B58B30O1)	EU: 275 kW (374 PS; 369 hp) at 5,500-6,500 rpm US: 285 kW (387 PS; 382 hp) at 5,800-6,500 rpm	500 N⋅m (369 ft⋅lb) at 1,800-5,000 rpm	[4.5] seconds

=== Diesel ===
Model	Years	Engine	Power	Torque	0–100 km/h (0–62 mph)
420d 420d xDrive	2021-present	2.0 L B47 turbo I4	140 kW (190 PS) at 4,000 rpm	400 N⋅m (295 ft⋅lb) at 1,750-2,500 rpm	7.1 [7.4] seconds
430d xDrive	2021-present	3.0 L B57 turbo I6	210 kW (286 PS) at 4,000 rpm	650 N⋅m (479 ft⋅lb) at 1,750-2,500 rpm	[5.1] seconds
M440d xDrive	2021-present	3.0 L B57 twin-turbo I6	250 kW (340 PS) at 4,400 rpm	700 N⋅m (516 ft⋅lb) at 1,750-2,250 rpm	[4.6] seconds

- Starting in late 2024, the diesel engines for the facelifted 4 series (LCI) will no longer be offered in United Kingdom, leaving petrol engines only.

== Safety ==
=== ANCAP ===
ANCAP test results* BMW 4 Series 2.0 litre Coupe variants (2019, aligned with Euro NCAP)
Test	Points	%
Overall:	5 /5 stars	
Adult occupant:	37	97%
Child occupant:	42.1	86%
Pedestrian:	44.7	93%
Safety assist:	9.6	73%

ANCAP test results* BMW 4 Series 2.0 litre Convertible variants (2019, aligned with Euro NCAP)
Test	Points	%
Overall:	5 /5 stars	
Adult occupant:	36.8	96%
Child occupant:	44.7	93%
Pedestrian:	44.7	93%
Safety assist:	9.6	73%

=== Euro NCAP ===
Euro NCAP test results* BMW 420d (LHD) (2019)
Test	Points	%
Overall:	5 /5 stars	
Adult occupant:	37.1	97%
Child occupant:	41.1	83%
Pedestrian:	44.8	93%
Safety assist:	9.5	72%

Euro NCAP test results* BMW 420d (LHD) (2019)
Test	Points	%
Overall:	5 /5 stars	
Adult occupant:	36.8	96%
Child occupant:	39.6	80%
Pedestrian:	44.8	93%
Safety assist:	9.5	72%

== BMW M4 (G82) ==
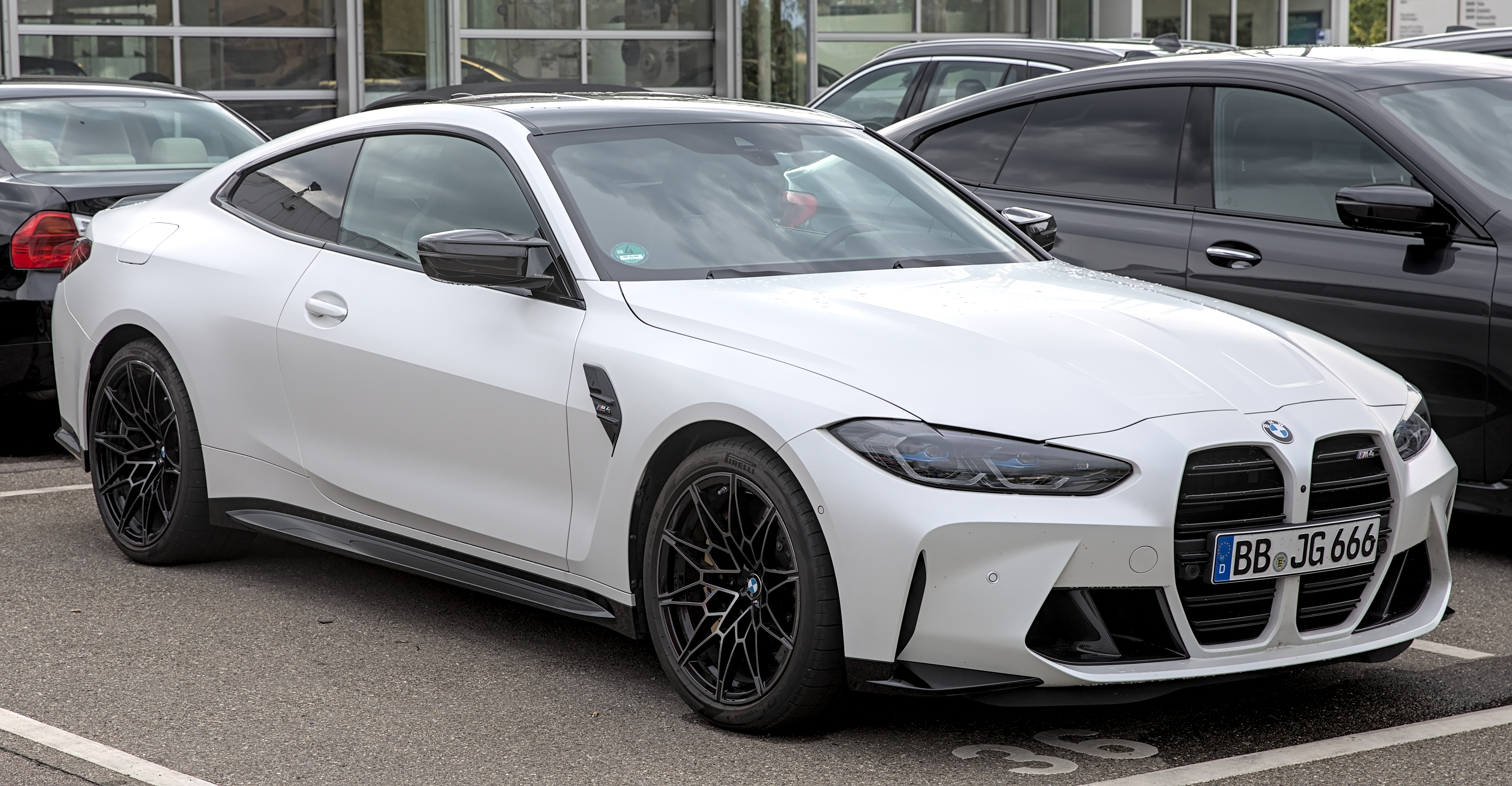
BMW M4 (G82)

The M4 variants are the most powerful of the 4 Series, yielding a maximum of 503 horsepower in the M4 competition series. It was designed and developed by BMW M, a division of BMW that engineers performance variants of the company's standard vehicles. The M4 is new to the market relative to other M models, being manufactured from 2014 to the present.

Two generations of M models have been made from the 4 series: the F32 (first generation) and the G22. Like other M variants, upgrades from the standard 4 series are designed to increase the vehicle's speed and handling. These include a more powerful engine with better response time, more powerful brake pistons and calipers, body styling adjustments, improved steering, and a better suspension.

== BMW i4 (G26) ==
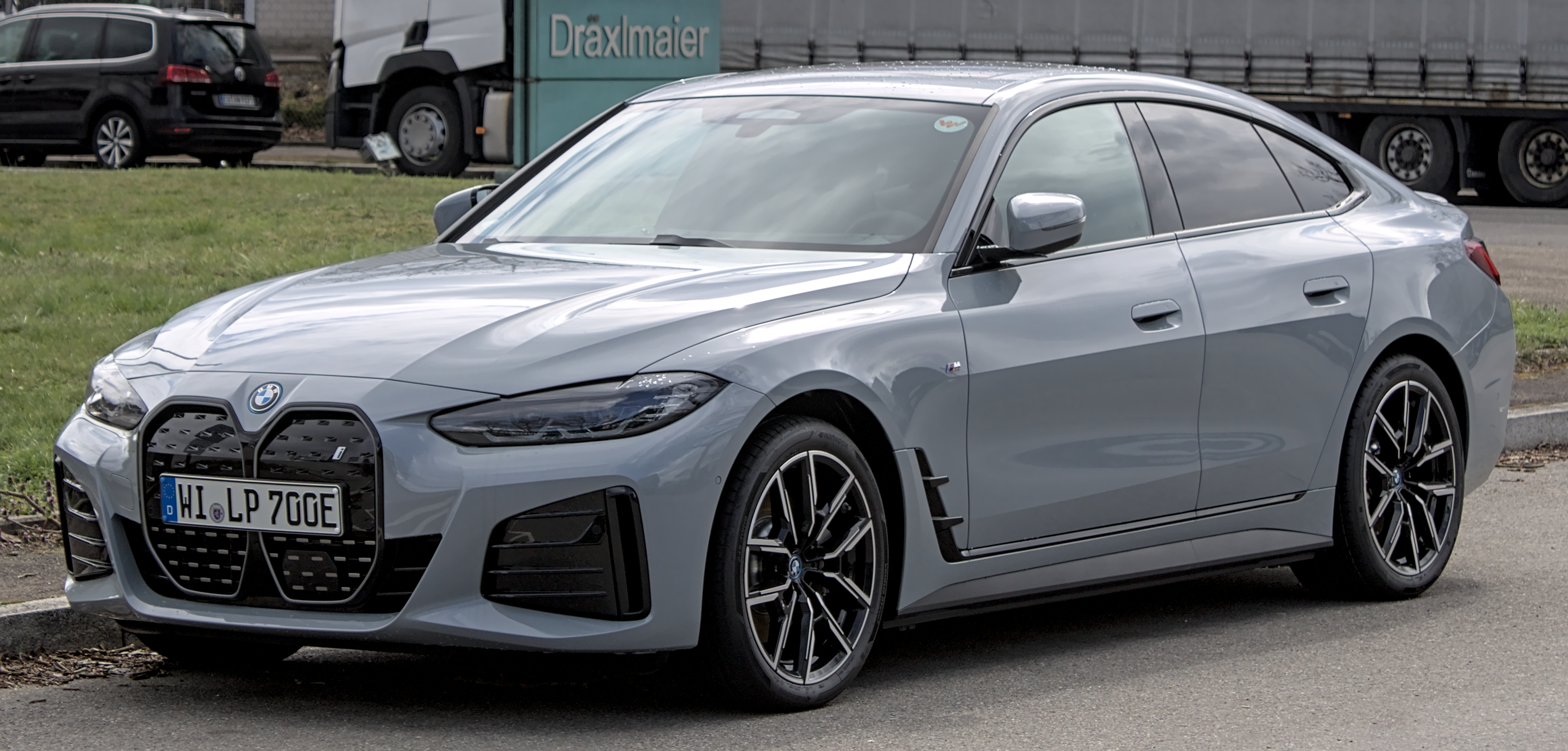
BMW i4

Based on the 4 Series Gran Coupé, the i4 is a battery electric liftback produced since 2021.
