= BMW B48 =

Turbocharged inline-four petrol engine

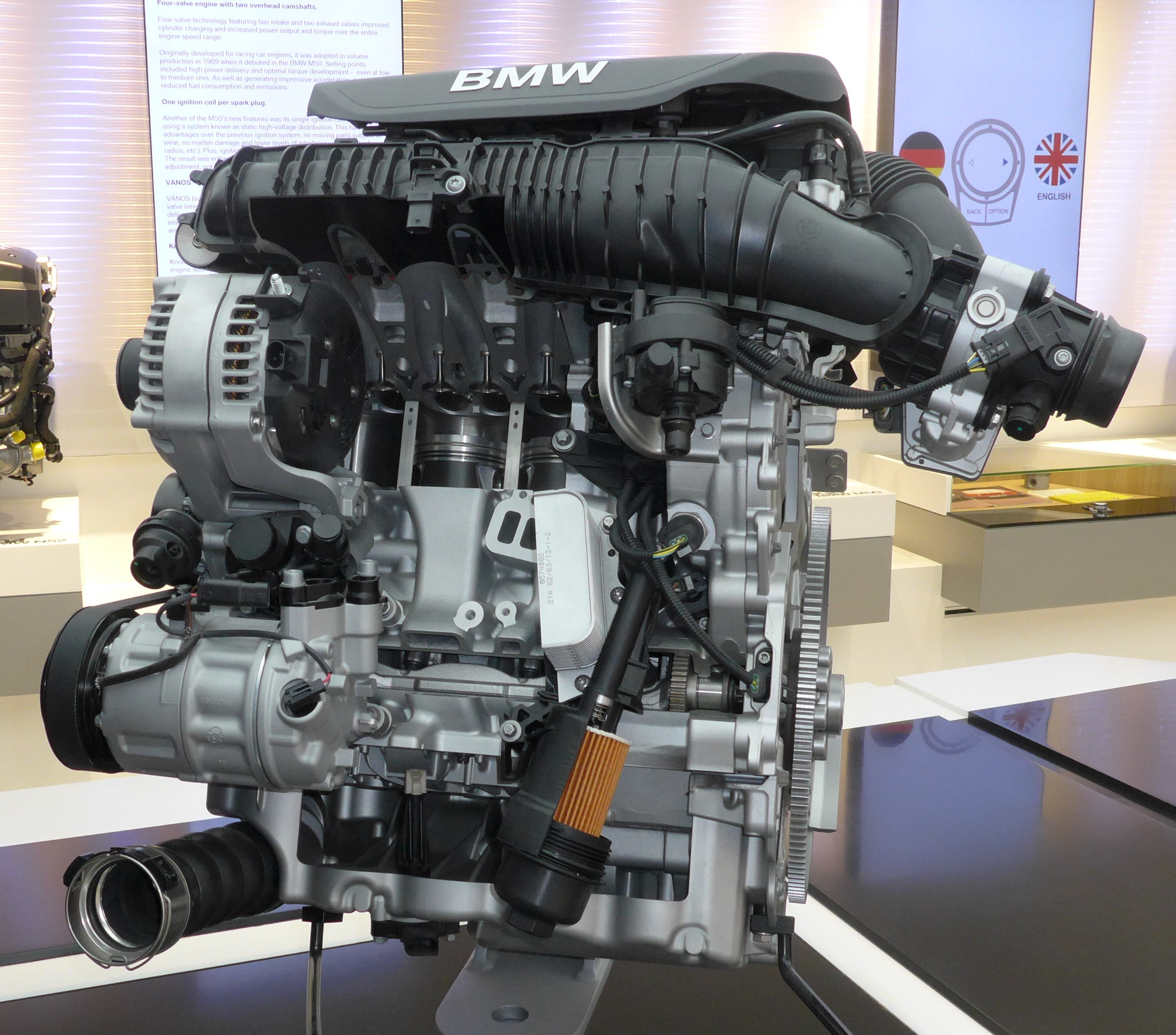

Overview
- Manufacturer: BMW
- Production: 2014–present

Layout
- Configuration: Inline-four
- Displacement: 1,597 cc (97 cu in); 1,998 cc (122 cu in)
- Cylinder bore: 82.0 mm (3.23 in)
- Piston stroke: 75.6 mm (2.98 in); 94.6 mm (3.72 in)
- Cylinder block material: Aluminium
- Cylinder head material: Aluminium
- Valvetrain: DOHC, with VVT & VVL
- Valvetrain drive system: Chain
- Compression ratio: 9.5:1; 11:1

Combustion
- Turbocharger: Single twin-scroll with air-to-liquid intercooler
- Fuel system: Bosch HDEV5/HDEV5 EVO 200 bar (2,901 psi) central high-pressure Gasoline direct fuel injection. One direct injector per cylinder fed by an Bosch engine-driven high-pressure fuel pump (B48 non-TU); Bosch HDEV6 350 bar (5,076 psi) central high-pressure gasoline direct fuel injection. One direct injector per cylinder fed by an Bosch HDP6 engine-driven high-pressure fuel pump (B48TU)
- Management: Bosch Di-Motronic
- Fuel type: Petrol
- Oil system: Wet sump with water heat exchanger
- Cooling system: Water-cooled

Output
- Power output: 115–233 kW (154–312 hp)
- Torque output: 250–450 N⋅m (184–332 lb⋅ft)

Chronology
- Predecessor: BMW N20

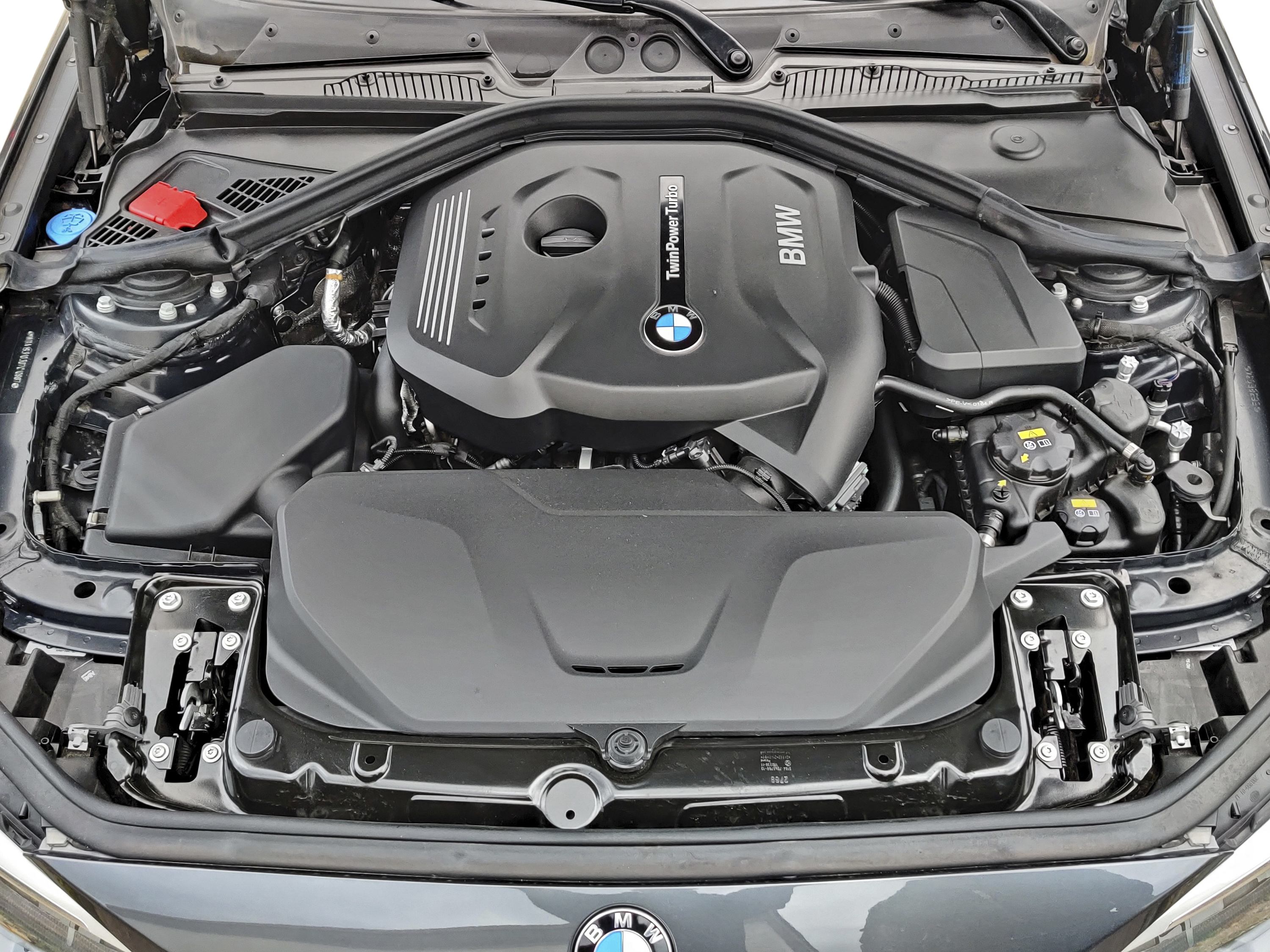
BD

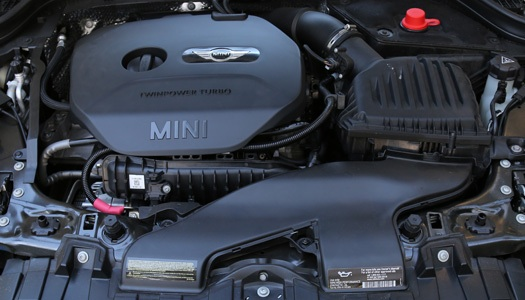
B48 in a 2014 MINI Cooper S

The BMW B48 is a turbocharged inline-four petrol engine which replaced the BMW N20 and has been in production since 2014. It was first used in the F56 Mini Hatch and has been used in BMW applications since 2015.

The B48 is part of a modular BMW engine family of 3-cylinder (B38/B37), 4-cylinder (B48/B47) and 6-cylinder (B58/B57) engines, which use a displacement of 500 cc (30.5 cu in) per cylinder.

A SULEV version of the BMW B48, the B46, is sold in the United States and other regions with strict emissions standards. Outside of minor differences, primarily with emissions control hardware, the two lines of engines are essentially identical and feature similar performance and reliability.

== Design ==
Compared with its N20 predecessor, the B48 uses a more undersquare design, and an engine block using "closed-deck construction". As with the N20, the block and head are made from aluminium. Other features shared with the N20 include a twin-scroll turbocharger, direct injection, variable valve lift (Valvetronic) and variable valve timing (Double VANOS).

=== Technical Update versions ===
The B48 engine was revised in 2018, dubbed "B48TU" ("Technical Update"), with notable changes and improvements; a new one-part timing chain as opposed to the earlier two-part, a new separate cooling circuits for the cylinder head and crankcase, and forged conrods and forged crankshaft is now 2.03 lb (1 kg) lighter due to the use of lighter materials and different machining. The fuel system also upgraded with the new Bosch HDP6 high pressure fuel pump and Bosch HDEV6 injectors that borrows from the P48 Turbo Engine.

== Models ==
Engine		Power	Torque	Years
B48B16	1,597 cc (97 cu in)	125 kW (168 hp) at 5,000–6,000 rpm	250 N⋅m (184 lb⋅ft) at 2,000–4,700 rpm	2017–
B48B20	1,998 cc (122 cu in)	115 kW (154 hp) at 4,500–6,500 rpm	250 N⋅m (184 lb⋅ft) at 1,300–4,300 rpm	2020–
B48A20U1	1,998 cc (122 cu in)	131 kW (176 hp) at 5,000–5,500 rpm	280 N⋅m (207 lb⋅ft) at 1,350–4,200 rpm	2020–
B48B20M0	1,998 cc (122 cu in)	135 kW (181 hp) at 5,000–6,500 rpm	270 N⋅m (199 lb⋅ft) at 1,350–4,600 rpm	2016–
B48B20M0	1,998 cc (122 cu in)	135 kW (181 hp) at 5,000–6,500 rpm	290 N⋅m (214 lb⋅ft) at 1,350–4,250 rpm	2016–
B48A20M1	1,998 cc (122 cu in)	141 kW (189 hp) at 5,000–6,500 rpm	280 N⋅m (207 lb⋅ft) at 1,250–4,600 rpm	2014–
B48A20M1	1,998 cc (122 cu in)	141 kW (189 hp) at 4,700–6,000 rpm	280 N⋅m (207 lb⋅ft) at 1,250–4,750 rpm	2014–
B48A20M1	1,998 cc (122 cu in)	141 kW (189 hp) at 5,000–6,000 rpm	280 N⋅m (207 lb⋅ft) at 1,350–4,600 rpm	2014–
B48A20M1	1,998 cc (122 cu in)	195 kW (261 hp) at 5,000–6,000 rpm	400 N⋅m (295 lb⋅ft) at 1,350–4,600 rpm	2014–
B48B20M1	1,998 cc (122 cu in)	145 kW (194 hp) at 4,500–6,600 rpm	320 N⋅m (236 lb⋅ft) at 1,450–4,200 rpm	2019–
B48B20O1	1,998 cc (122 cu in)	165 kW (221 hp) at 5,000–6,500 rpm	310 N⋅m (229 lb⋅ft) at 1,400–5,000 rpm	2016–
B48A20O1	1,998 cc (122 cu in)	170 kW (228 hp) at 5,000–6,000 rpm	350 N⋅m (258 lb⋅ft) at 1,250–4,500 rpm	2015–
B48A20O1	1,998 cc (122 cu in)	170 kW (228 hp) at 5,200–6,200 rpm	300 N⋅m (221 lb⋅ft) at 1,250–4,800 rpm	2015–
B48A20O1	1,998 cc (122 cu in)	170 kW (228 hp) at 5,000–6,000 rpm	350 N⋅m (258 lb⋅ft) at 1,450–4,500 rpm	2015–
B48O1ZIK	1,998 cc (122 cu in)	180 kW (241 hp) at 4,500–6,500 rpm	400 N⋅m (295 lb⋅ft) at 1,600–4,000 rpm	
B48B20O0	1,998 cc (122 cu in)	185 kW (248 hp) at 5,200–6,500 rpm	350 N⋅m (258 lb⋅ft) at 1,450–4,800 rpm	2015–
B48B20O1	1,998 cc (122 cu in)	190 kW (255 hp) at 5,000–6,500 rpm	400 N⋅m (295 lb⋅ft) at 1,550–4,400 rpm	2019–
B48A20T1	1,998 cc (122 cu in)	225 kW (302 hp) at 5,000–6,250 rpm	450 N⋅m (332 lb⋅ft) at 1,750–4,500 rpm	2019–
B48A20T2	1,998 cc (122 cu in)	233 kW (312 hp) at 5,000–6,250 rpm	400 N⋅m (295 lb⋅ft) at 1,750–4,500 rpm	2024–

=== 115 kW version ===
- 2020–present G20 318i
- 2022–present G42 218i

=== 125 kW version ===
- 2019–present G20 320i (Turkish and Tunisian market)
- 2020–present G22 420i (Turkish market)
- 2021–present G26 420i (Turkish market)
- 2017–present G30 520i (Turkish and Tunisian market)
- 2018–present G01 X3 sdrive20i (Turkish market)

=== 131 kW version ===
- 2021–present F54 MINI Cooper S Clubman (B48A20M)
- 2020–2024 F40 BMW 120i

=== 135 kW version ===
When combined with the electric motor, the 330e and 530e overall output is 185 kW (248 hp) and 420 N⋅m (310 lb⋅ft).

- 2016–2019 F20 120i
- 2016–2019 F22/F23 220i
- 2015–2019 F30/F31/F34 320i
- 2016–2019 F30 330e
- 2016–2019 F32/F33/F36 420i
- 2017–present G30/G31 520i
- 2018–present G30/G31 530e
- 2018–present G01 X3 xDrive20i
- 2018–present G02 X4 xDrive20i
- 2019–present G20 320i
- 2019–present G20 330e
- 2020–present G22 420i
- 2021–present G42 220i

=== 141 kW version ===
- 2017–2020 F60 MINI Cooper S Countryman
- 2014–2017 F45 BMW 2 Series Active/Gran Tourer 220
- 2024–present G45 X3 20/30e xDrive

=== 145 kW version ===
In the MINI Cooper S, a temporary overboost increases peak torque by 20 N⋅m (15 lb⋅ft) to 300 N⋅m (221 lb⋅ft).

- 2014–present F56 MINI Cooper S (B48A20A)
- 2020–present F44 220i Gran Coupe
- 2016–present F48 X1 20i
- 2017–present F39 X2 sDrive20i
- 2018–2026 G29 Z4 sDrive20i
- 2019–2026 J29/DB82 Toyota Supra (Japanese SZ models)

=== 150 kW version ===
- 2024-present F70 123

=== 165 kW version ===
- 2016–2019 F20 125i
- 2021–present U06 223i

=== 170 kW version ===
- 2014–present F56 MINI JCW Hardtop and JCW Cabrio (320 Nm)
- 2017–present F56 MINI JCW Clubman and JCW Countryman ALL4 (350 Nm)
- 2015–present F45 Active Tourer 225i
- 2016–present F48 X1 25i/28i
- 2017–present F39 X2 25i/28i
- 2019–current F44 228i Gran Coupé xDrive

=== 180 kW version ===
- 2022–present G42 230i
- 2022–present G20/G21 330i
- 2022–present G22 430i
- 2023–present U11 X1 28i xDrive

=== 185 kW version ===
- 2015–2019 F30/F31/F34 330i
- 2016–present F22/F23 230i
- 2016–present F32/F33/F36 430i
- 2018–present G01 X3 xDrive30i
- 2018–present G02 X4 xDrive30i
- 2020–present G01 X3 xDrive30e (PHEV Version)
- 2016–present G30/G31 530i

=== 190 kW version ===
- 2016–present G11 730i/730Li
- 2017–2019 G11 740e xDrive/740Le xDrive (combined with an 82 kW electric motor for a total output of 240 kW)
- 2017–2021 G32 630i
- 2019–2022 G20/G21 330i
- 2019–2026 G29 Z4 sDrive30i
- 2019–2026 J29/DB22 Toyota Supra
- 2020–present Morgan Plus Four
- 2020–present G22/G23/G26 430i

=== 195 kW version ===
- 2020–2024 BMW F40 128ti

=== 225 kW version ===
Introduced in May 2019 this engine features a reinforced crankshaft with larger main bearings and new pistons with a lower 9.5:1 compression ratio, this allows the engine to take more boost pressure from a larger turbocharger, which blows compressed air through a reworked intake tract.

- 2019–2024 F40 M135i xDrive
- 2019–2024 F44 M235i xDrive Gran Coupé
- 2019–2023 F39 X2 M35i xDrive
- 2019–present F54 Clubman JCW
- 2019–present F60 Countryman JCW
- 2020–present F56 MINI John Cooper Works GP

=== 233 kW version ===
In the EU BMW has had to drop the power output to 300 hp due to new emissions standards. In the US it actually gets an upgrade to 312 hp.

- 2025-present F70 M135 xDrive
- 2025-present F74 M235 xDrive Gran Coupé
- 2024–present U11 X1 M35i xDrive
- 2024–present U10 X2 M35i xDrive
- 2024-present U25 Countryman John Cooper Works All4
