= BMW 1 Series (F70) =

Fourth generation of BMW 1 Series

BMW 1 Series (fourth generation)
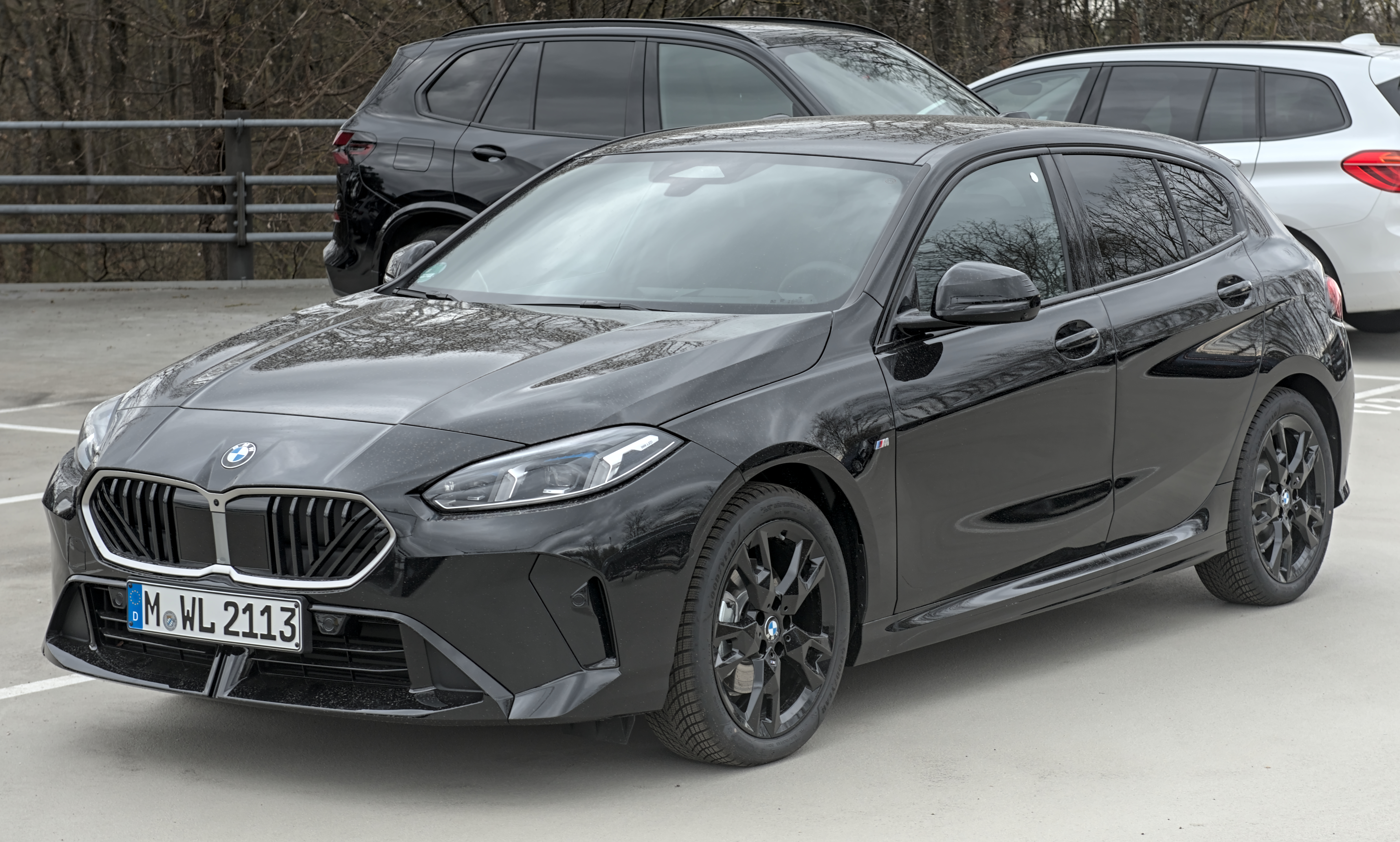
- 2024 BMW 120

Overview
- Manufacturer: BMW
- Model code: F70
- Production: July 2024 – present
- Model years: 2025–present
- Assembly: Germany: Leipzig (BMW Leipzig Plant)
- Designer: José Casas, Jae-heon Lee, Ted Lee (exterior); Julius Laurien (interior)

Body and chassis
- Class: Subcompact executive car
- Body style: 5-door hatchback
- Layout: Front-engine, front-wheel-drive; Front-engine, all-wheel-drive (xDrive)
- Platform: BMW UKL2 platform
- Related: BMW 2 Series Gran Coupé (F74/F78)

Powertrain
- Engine: Petrol: 1.5 L B38 turbo I3; 1.5 L B38; turbo I3 mild hybrid; 2.0 L B48 turbo I4; Diesel: 2.0 L B47 turbo I4; 2.0 L B47 turbo I4 mild hybrid
- Electric motor: 48V power booster (MHEV)
- Transmission: 7-speed Steptronic automatic Getrag/Magna 7DCT300
- Hybrid drivetrain: Mild Hybrid (MHEV)

Dimensions
- Wheelbase: 2,670 mm (105.1 in)
- Length: 4,361 mm (171.7 in)
- Width: 1,800 mm (70.9 in)
- Height: 1,459 mm (57.4 in)
- Kerb weight: 1,425–1,550 kg (3,142–3,417 lb)

Chronology
- Predecessor: BMW 1 Series (F40)

The BMW 1 Series (F70) is the fourth generation of the BMW 1 Series range of subcompact executive hatchback cars. Like the previous generation F40 1 Series, the F70 1 Series uses a front-wheel drive configuration and is only available as a 5-door hatchback.

== Overview ==
The F70 1 Series was officially unveiled on 4 June 2024. It retains the UKL2 platform, which underpins F74 2 Series Gran Coupé. Production at the BMW Leipzig Plant commenced in July 2024 with a schedule market launch in October 2024.

The F70 1 Series is the first BMW model to drop the 'i' suffix for petrol models, to adapt with BMW's strategy for using the 'i' prefix for battery electric models. The diesel models continued to be marketed with the 'd' suffix.

Compared to its predecessor, the F70 1 Series is 42 mm (1.7 in) longer and 25 mm (0.98 in) taller. The boot capacity is unchanged at 380 L (13 cu ft) with the rear seats raised, and 1,200 L (42 cu ft) with the rear seats folded. For the mild hybrid models, boot space decreased by 80 L (2.8 cu ft) to 300 L (11 cu ft) due to the placement of a 48-volt battery under the boot floor.

The exterior is an evolution of its predecessor being a heavy facelift of the F40 1 Series instead of a complete redesign. Exterior highlights includes the number '1' in the Hofmeister kink C-Pillar trim piece when equipped with BMW Individual Shadow Line trim, LED taillights which has a similar shape from the X2 and the first BMW model to have a contrast roof option. Unlike newer BMW models, the F70 1 Series retain its conventional grab handles.

The interior is completely redesigned and has a similar layout to the X1 (U11). It features a BMW Curved Display which houses both the 10.25-inch digital instrument cluster and a 10.7-inch touchscreen infotainment system (powered by BMW Operating System 9) with QuickSelect functions. A gear selector switch is used for the automatic transmission instead of a gear lever and the number of physical interior controls has been reduced, including the omission of the iDrive control wheel (like on other entry-level BMW models).

The 1 Series is available with the latest generation of petrol and diesel engines borrowed from the X1 (U11), a plug-in hybrid option is not available for the 1 Series. All models come standard with a 7-speed Steptronic automatic transmission. For the first time in its history, the 1 Series will not be offered with a manual transmission.

M135 xDrive models features an Adaptive M Chassis with sport steering, an M Compound brake system with 385 mm (38.5 cm) front and 330 mm (33 cm) rear disc brakes available as part of the M Technology package and M Specific quad exhaust system. For Europe, the M135 is detuned to 296 hp (221 kW) due to strict European emission standards.

=== Safety ===
Euro NCAP test results BMW 1 Series 1.5 M Sport (LHD) (2025)
Test	Points	%
Overall:	4 /5 stars	
Adult occupant:	31.2	78%
Child occupant:	41.6	84%
Pedestrian:	53.9	85%
Safety assist:	14.5	80%

ANCAP test results BMW 1 Series (2025, aligned with Euro NCAP)
Test	Points	%
Overall:	4 /5 stars	
Adult occupant:	31.24	78%
Child occupant:	42.37	86%
Pedestrian:	53.92	85%
Safety assist:	14.61	81%

=== Gallery ===
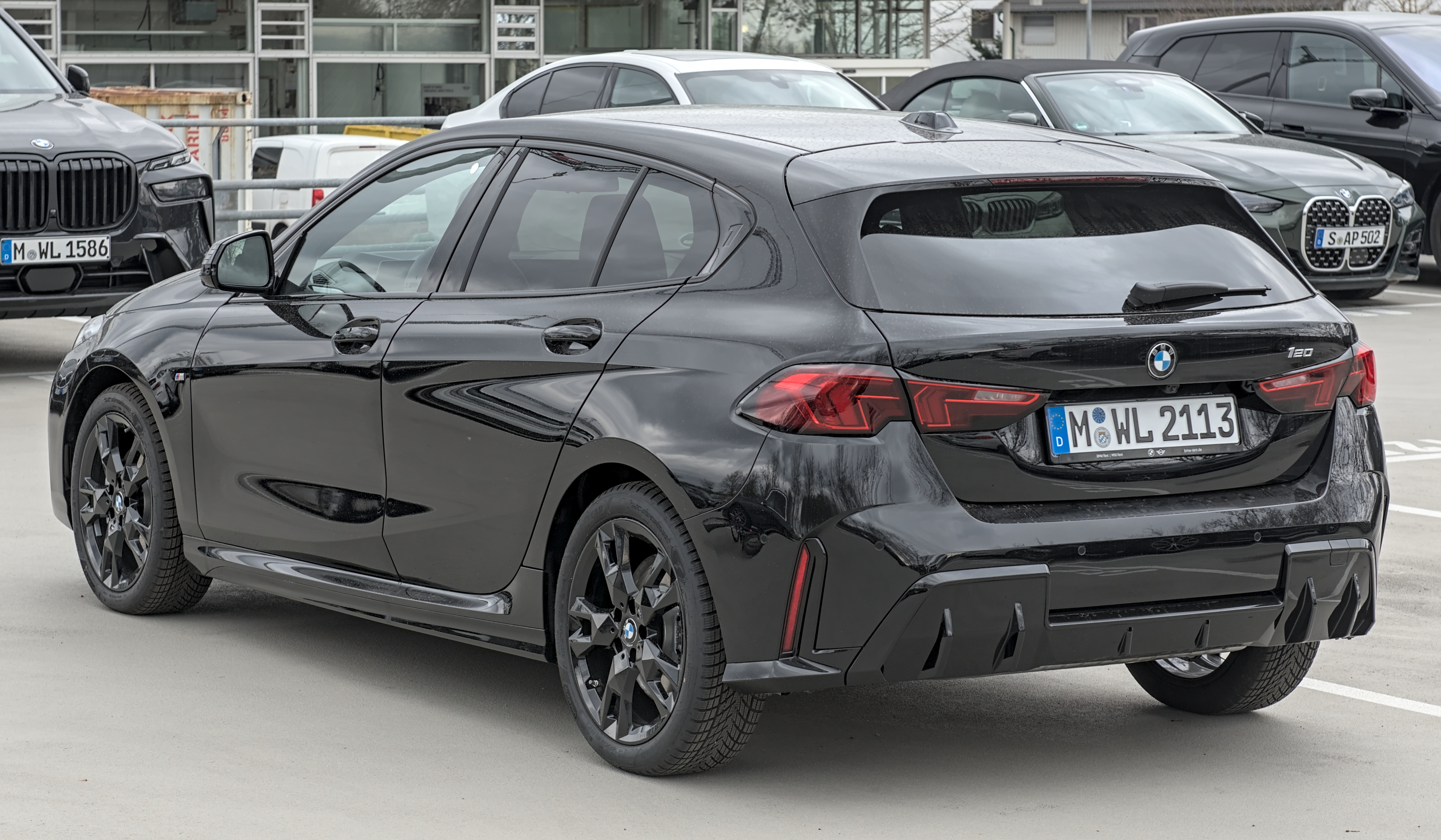
Rear view

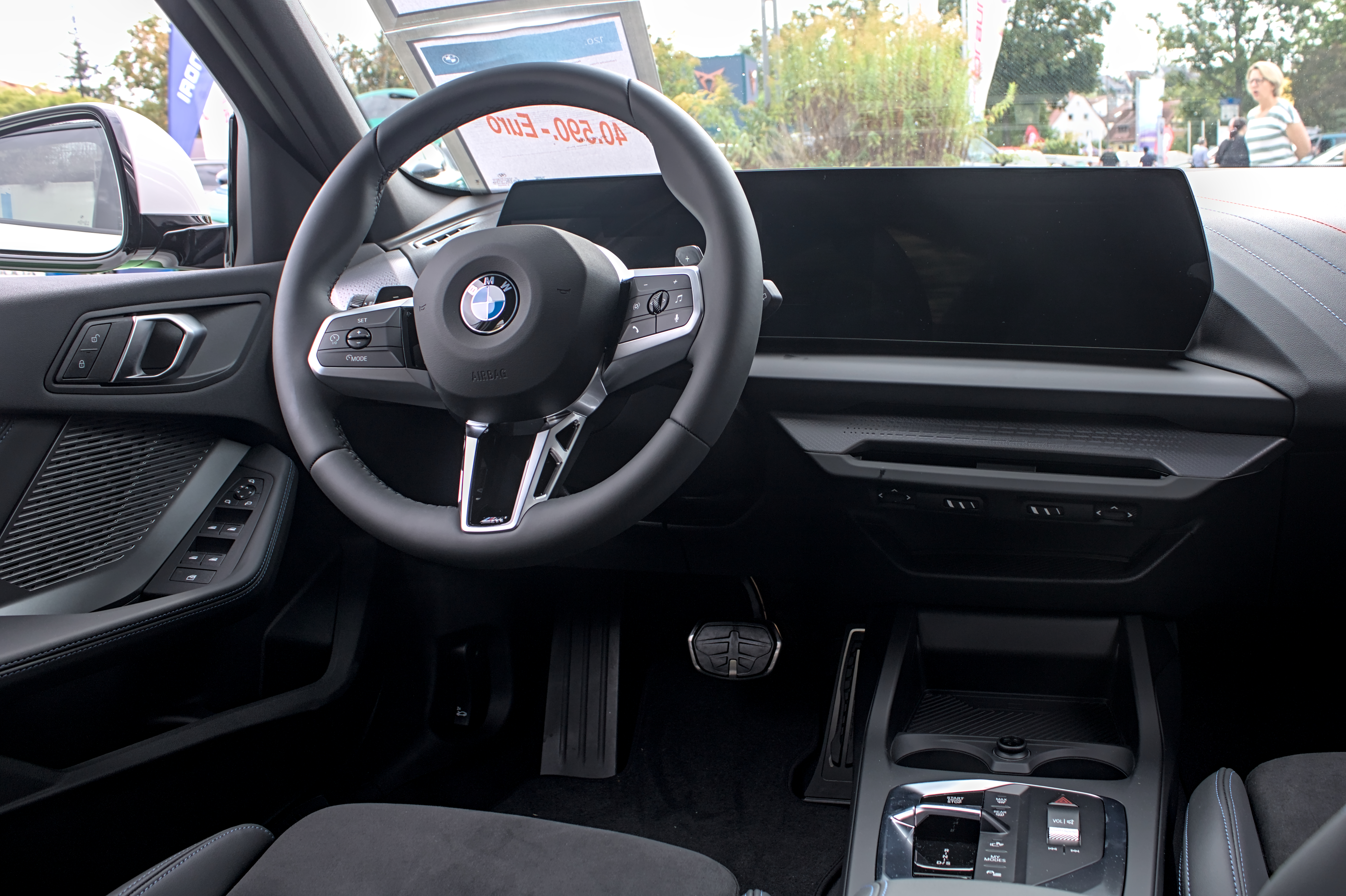
Interior

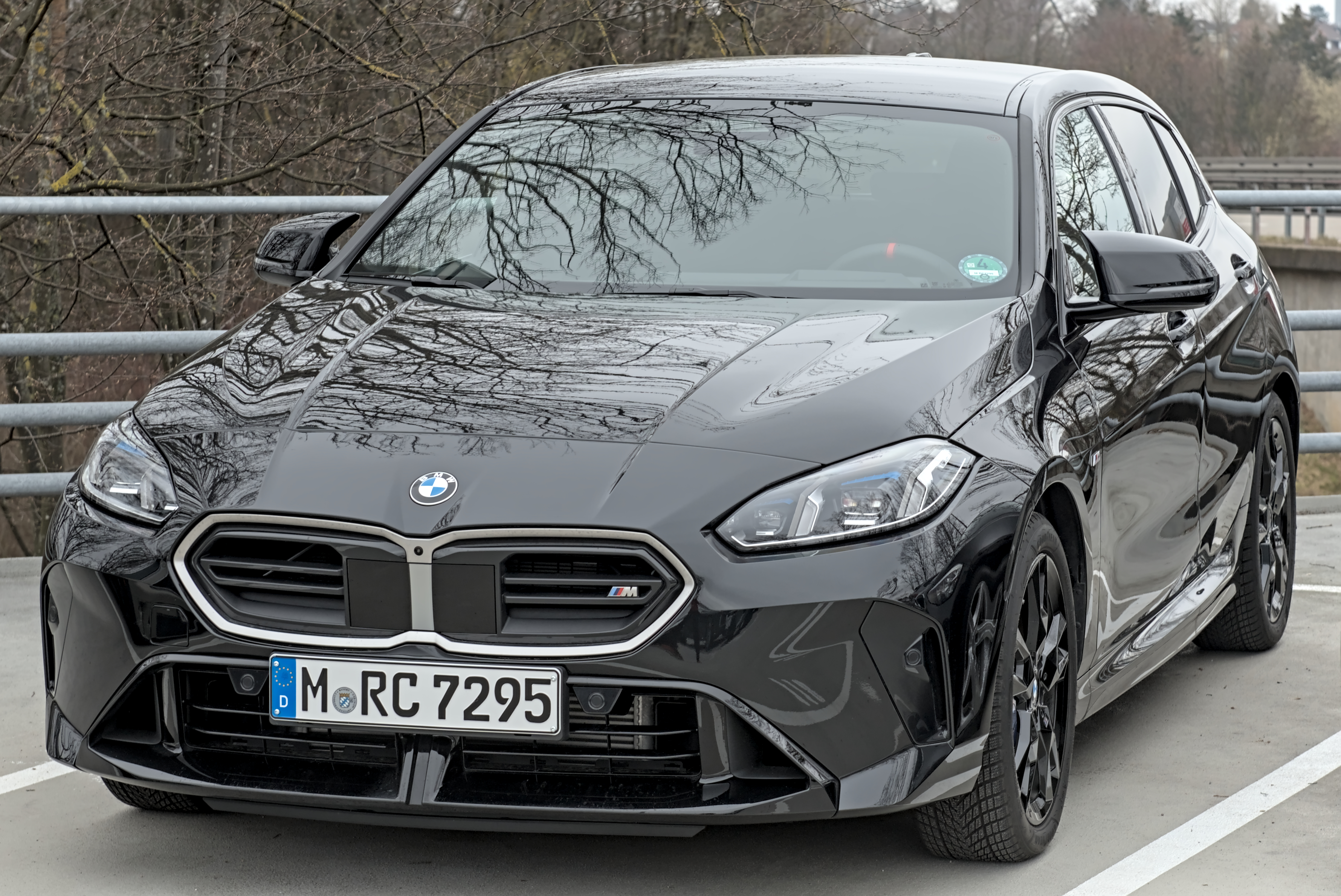
BMW M135 (Germany)

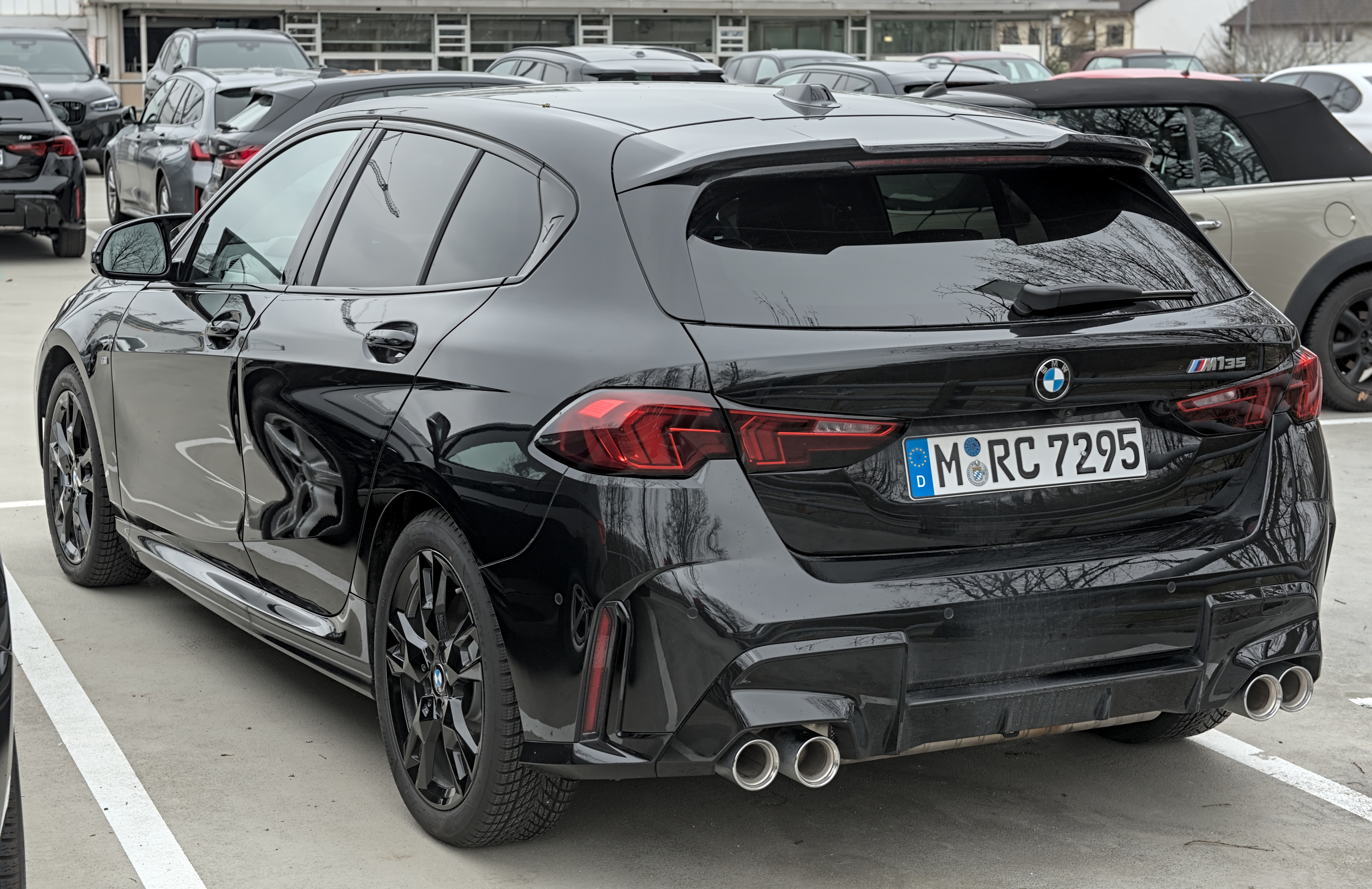
BMW M135 (Germany, rear view)

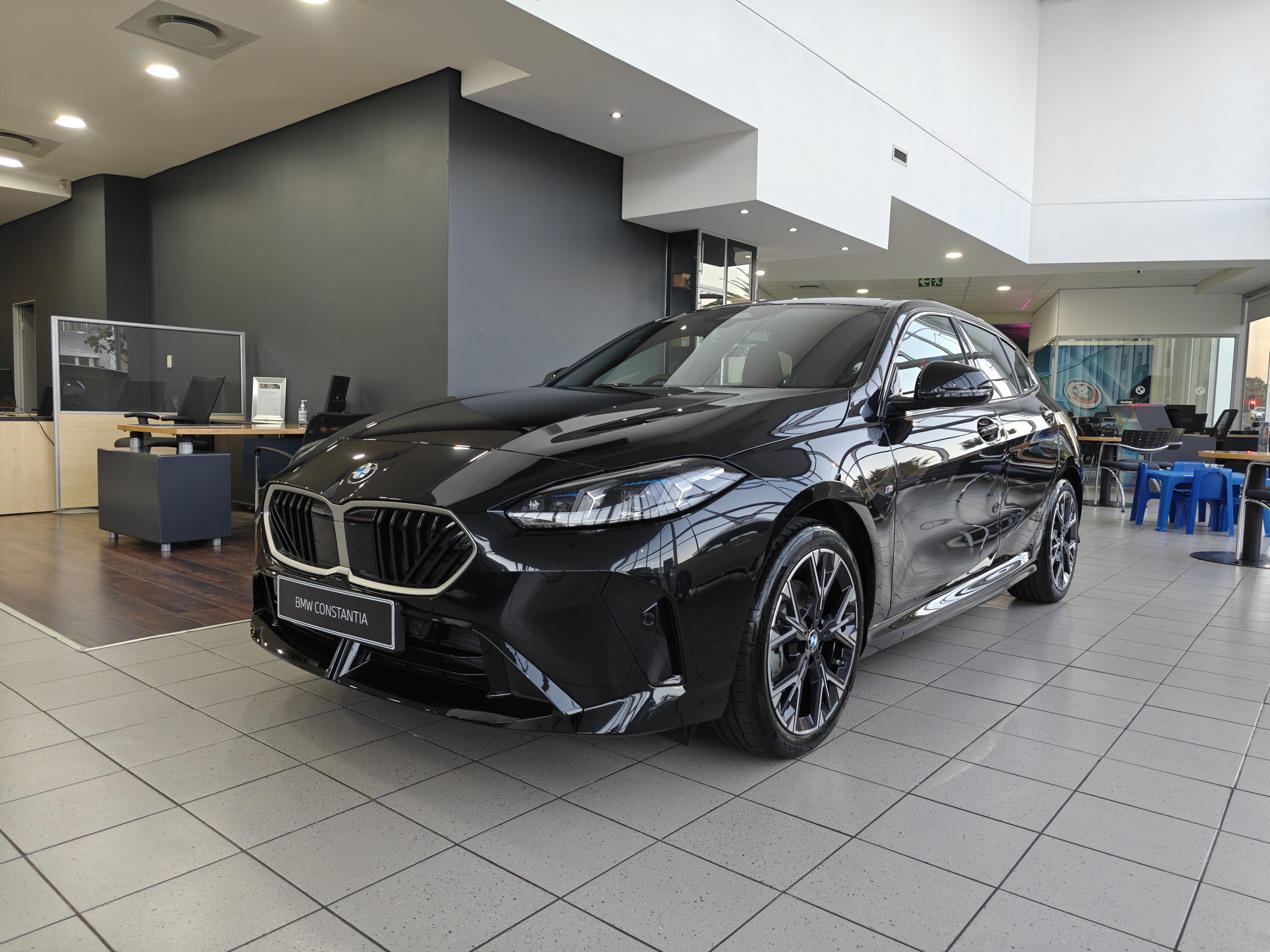
BMW 118 (South Africa)

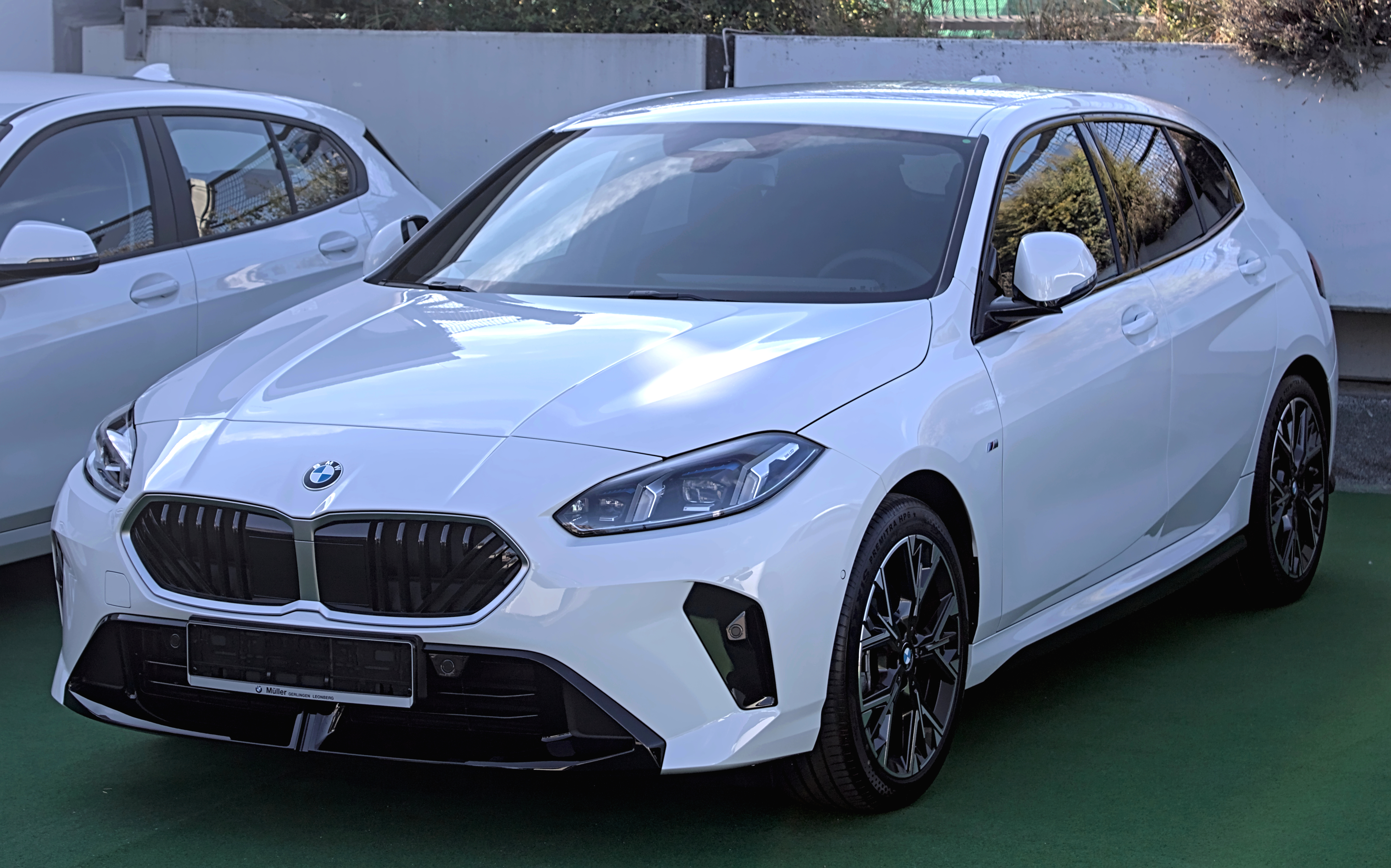
BMW 120 M Sport (Germany)

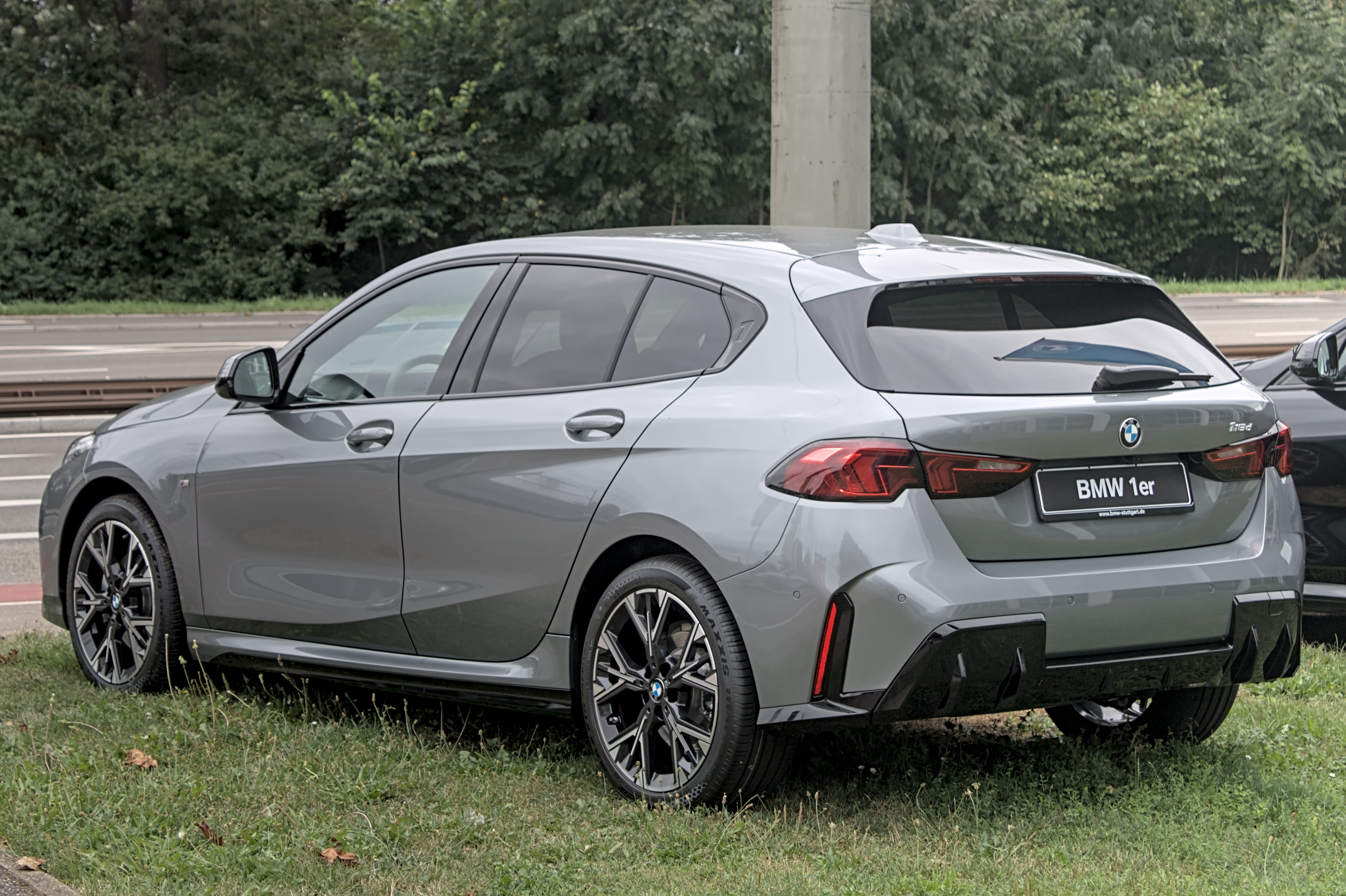
BMW 118d M Sport (Germany, rear view)

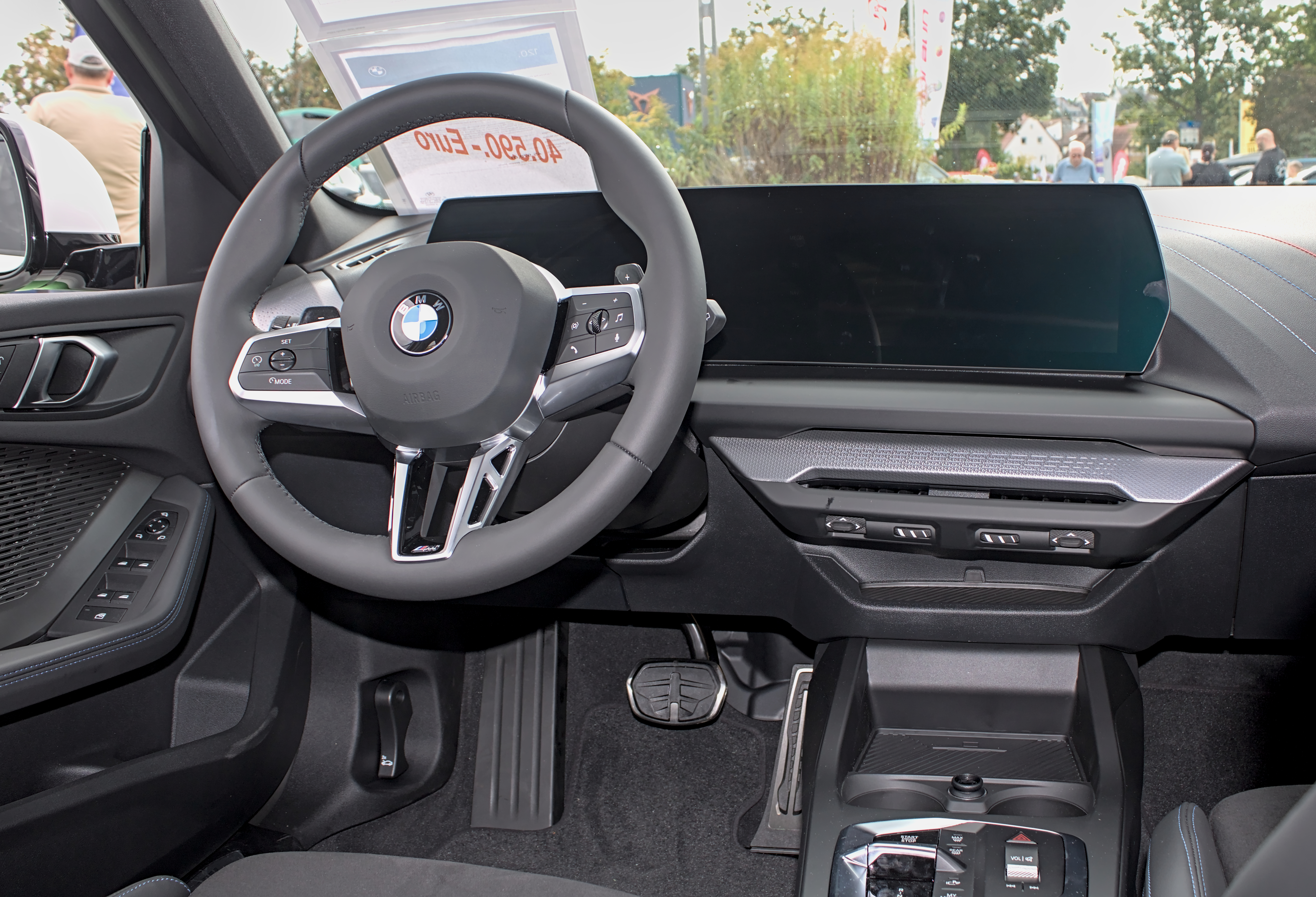
Interior (M Sport)

== Engines ==
Type	Model	Engine code	Displacement	Power	Torque	Electric motor	Battery	Top speed	0–100 km/h (0–62 mph)	Transmission
Petrol	116	B38	1,499 cc (1.5 L) I3 turbo	91 kW (122 hp; 124 PS) @ 4,400-6,500 rpm	230 N⋅m (23.5 kg⋅m; 170 lb⋅ft) @ 1,500-4,000 rpm	-	-	200 km/h (124 mph)	10.5 sec	7-speed Dual-Clutch Transmission Getrag/Magna Powertrain 7DCT300
Petrol	118 (Australia)	B38	1,499 cc (1.5 L) I3 turbo	100 kW (134 hp; 136 PS) @ 4,400-6,500 rpm	230 N⋅m (23.5 kg⋅m; 170 lb⋅ft) @ 1,500-4,000 rpm	-	-	208 km/h (129 mph)	9.2 sec	7-speed Dual-Clutch Transmission Getrag/Magna Powertrain 7DCT300
Petrol	118 (Australia)	B38	1,499 cc (1.5 L) I3 turbo	115 kW (154 hp; 156 PS) @ 4,900-6,500 rpm	230 N⋅m (23.5 kg⋅m; 170 lb⋅ft) @ 1,500-4,600 rpm	-	-	215 km/h (134 mph)	9 sec	7-speed Dual-Clutch Transmission Getrag/Magna Powertrain 7DCT300
Petrol	120 (Australia)	B48	1,998 cc (2.0 L) I4 turbo	150 kW (204 hp; 207 PS) @ 5,000-6,500 rpm	300 N⋅m (30.6 kg⋅m; 221 lb⋅ft) @ 1,450–4,500 rpm	-	-	246km/h (153 mph)	7.2 sec	7-speed Dual-Clutch Transmission Getrag/Magna Powertrain 7DCT300
Petrol	M135	B48	1,998 cc (2.0 L) I4 turbo	221 kW (296 hp; 300 PS) @ 5,750-6,250 rpm	400 N⋅m (40.8 kg⋅m; 295 lb⋅ft) @ 2,000–4,500 rpm	-	-	250km/h (155 mph)	4.9 sec	7-speed Dual-Clutch Transmission Getrag/Magna Powertrain 7DCT300
Petrol mild hybrid	120	B38	1,499 cc (1.5 L) I3 turbo	125 kW (168 hp; 170 PS) @ 4,700-6,500 rpm Motor: 14 kW (19 hp; 19 PS)	240 N⋅m (24.5 kg⋅m; 177 lb⋅ft) @ 1,500-4,000 rpm Motor: 55 N⋅m (5.61 kg⋅m; 40.6 lb⋅ft)	48 V power booster	20 Ah rear battery	216 km/h (134 mph)	8.3 sec	7-speed Dual-Clutch Transmission Getrag/Magna Powertrain 7DCT300
Petrol mild hybrid	123	B48	1,998 cc (2.0 L) I4 turbo	160 kW (215 hp; 218 PS) @ 5,000-6,500 rpm Motor: 14 kW (19 hp; 19 PS)	320 N⋅m (32.6 kg⋅m; 236 lb⋅ft) @ 1,500-4,000 rpm Motor: 55 N⋅m (5.61 kg⋅m; 40.6 lb⋅ft)	48 V power booster	20 Ah rear battery	233 km/h (145 mph)	6.3 sec	7-speed Dual-Clutch Transmission Getrag/Magna Powertrain 7DCT300
Diesel	118d	B47	1,995 cc (2.0 L) I4 turbo	110 kW (148 hp; 150 PS) @ 3,750-4,000 rpm	360 N⋅m (36.7 kg⋅m; 266 lb⋅ft) @ 1,500-2,500 rpm	-	-	210 km/h (130 mph)	8.9 sec	7-speed Dual-Clutch Transmission Getrag/Magna Powertrain 7DCT300
Diesel mild hybrid	120d	B47	1,995 cc (2.0 L) I4 turbo	120 kW (161 hp; 163 PS) @ 3,750-4,000 rpm Motor: 14 kW (19 hp; 19 PS)	360 N⋅m (36.7 kg⋅m; 266 lb⋅ft) @ 1,500-2,500 rpm Motor: 55 N⋅m (5.61 kg⋅m; 40.6 lb⋅ft)	48 V power booster	20 Ah rear battery	225 km/h (140 mph)	8.6 sec	7-speed Dual-Clutch Transmission Getrag/Magna Powertrain 7DCT300
