= Gasoline particulate filter =

Emissions control device

A Gasoline Particulate Filter (GPF) is an emissions control device designed to reduce fine particulate emissions from gasoline direct injection (GDI) engines. It is derived from the diesel particulate filter (DPF), which became common on diesel engine vehicles before stricter emissions standards such as Euro VI and China 6a required similar systems for gasoline engines used in light-duty automobiles.

Unlike DPFs that capture relatively large soot particles, gasoline particulate filters are optimized to capture fine particulates measuring 2.5 microns (PM_{2.5}) and smaller. These particulates are particularly prevalent in gasoline direct injection engines due to incomplete combustion of fuel droplets during the combustion process.

== Operation ==
A GPF typically consists of a porous honeycomb structure made from ceramic cordierite, a material commonly used in catalytic converters and diesel particulate filters due to its low thermal expansion and high resistance to thermal shock. The GPF is installed in the exhaust system downstream of the catalytic converters.

When exhaust gases flow through the filter, particulate matter becomes trapped within the cell walls. Under suitable conditions—typically when exhaust gas temperatures exceed 600 °C (1,100 °F)—these particulates are oxidized into carbon dioxide in the presence of oxygen, particularly during engine overrun.

If oxidation does not occur for extended periods, the trapped particulates can accumulate and gradually increase back pressure in the exhaust, potentially affecting engine performance. This issue is less common in gasoline engines than in diesel engines because gasoline engines generally operate with higher exhaust temperatures.

When necessary, a process known as regeneration is triggered by the engine control unit (ECU). The ECU temporarily increases exhaust temperature, often by adjusting the air–fuel ratio to run leaner. The elevated temperature enables the oxidation of accumulated soot, clearing the filter and restoring normal exhaust flow.

== Applications ==
Gasoline particulate filters are most commonly found in light-duty passenger vehicles equipped with gasoline direct injection engines that are subject to modern emissions standards such as Bharat Stage 6, Euro VI, China 6a, or EPA Tier 4. These regulations set strict limits on particulate emissions and mandate filtration technologies in many markets.

In Europe, all PSA Group models have been fitted with GPFs since late 2017. Manufacturers such as Volkswagen Group—whose brands include Volkswagen, Audi, SEAT, and Škoda—and BMW have also implemented GPFs across their vehicle lineups since 2018. Other brands including Mercedes-Benz, Volvo, and Opel have similarly adopted this technology.

High-performance vehicles are also subject to these regulations. Cars such as the Porsche 911 range (including the GT3 variant), the Audi R8, and various models from Ferrari beginning with the F8 Tributo employ gasoline particulate filters to meet European emission norms. An exception is the Lamborghini Huracán Evo, which shares a similar engine design to the Audi R8 but does not use a GPF, as its combination of fuel injection systems—both port and direct—reduces particulate formation and prevents excessive soot accumulation.

In the United States, EPA Tier 4 standards, which restrict particulate emissions from gasoline vehicles, are scheduled to come into effect starting in 2027. As of March 2026, Ford has begun implementing GPFs on models such as the Maverick and the F-150 powered by EcoBoost engines.
