= BMW X2 =

Subcompact luxury crossover SUV

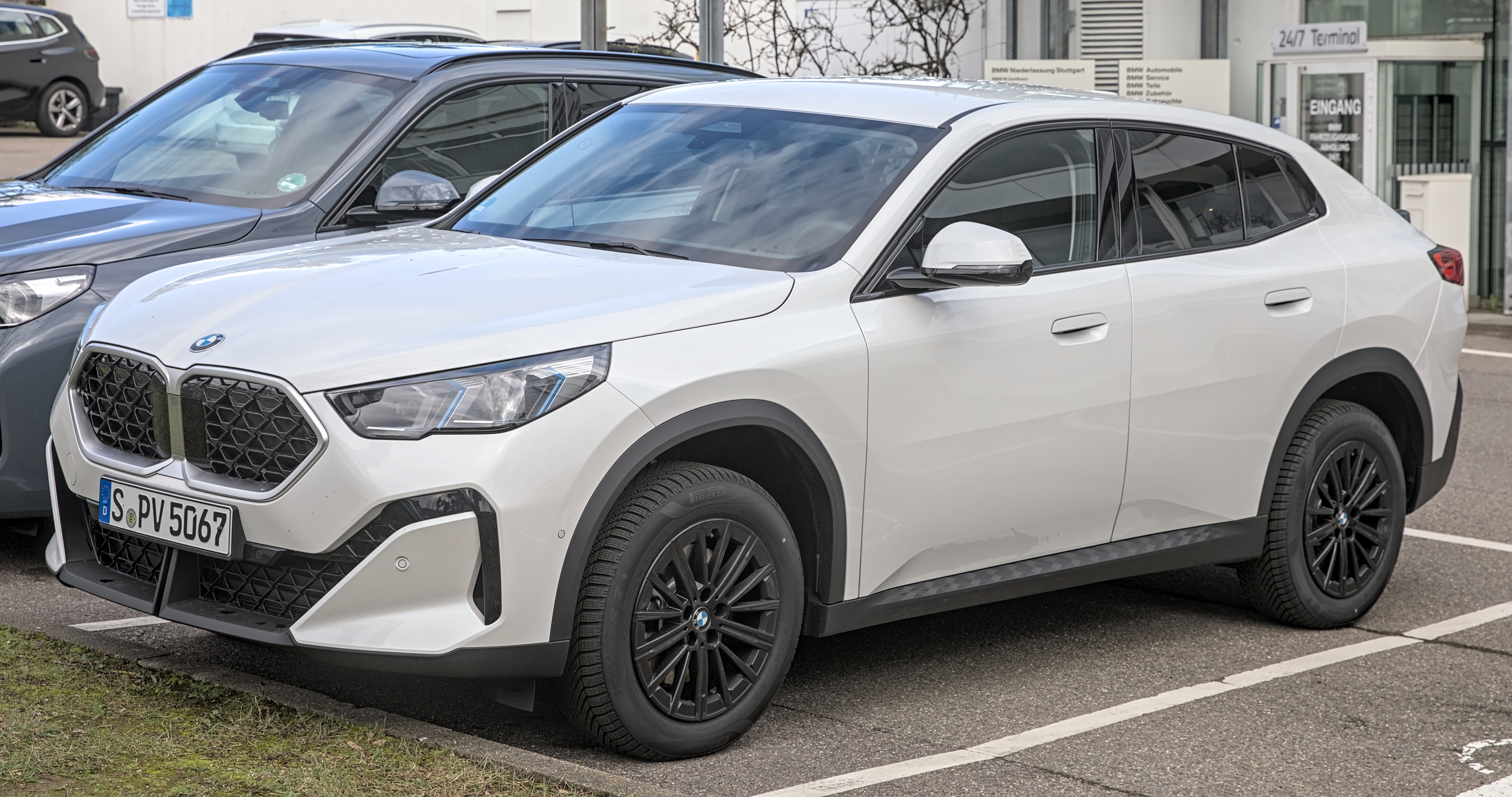

Overview
- Manufacturer: BMW
- Production: November 2017–present

Body and chassis
- Class: Subcompact luxury crossover SUV
- Body style: 5-door SUV
- Layout: Front-engine, front-wheel-drive; Front-engine, all-wheel-drive (xDrive); Dual-motors, all-wheel-drive (iX2)
- Related: BMW X1

The BMW X2 is a subcompact luxury crossover SUV produced by BMW since 2017. It is marketed as a sports activity coupé (SAC), and is considered a sportier and less practical alternative to the X1, as is the case with other even-numbered X models with their respective odd-numbered counterparts. As of 2026, it is positioned between the X1 and the larger X3 in BMW's SUV global lineup.

== First generation (F39; 2017) ==
First generation
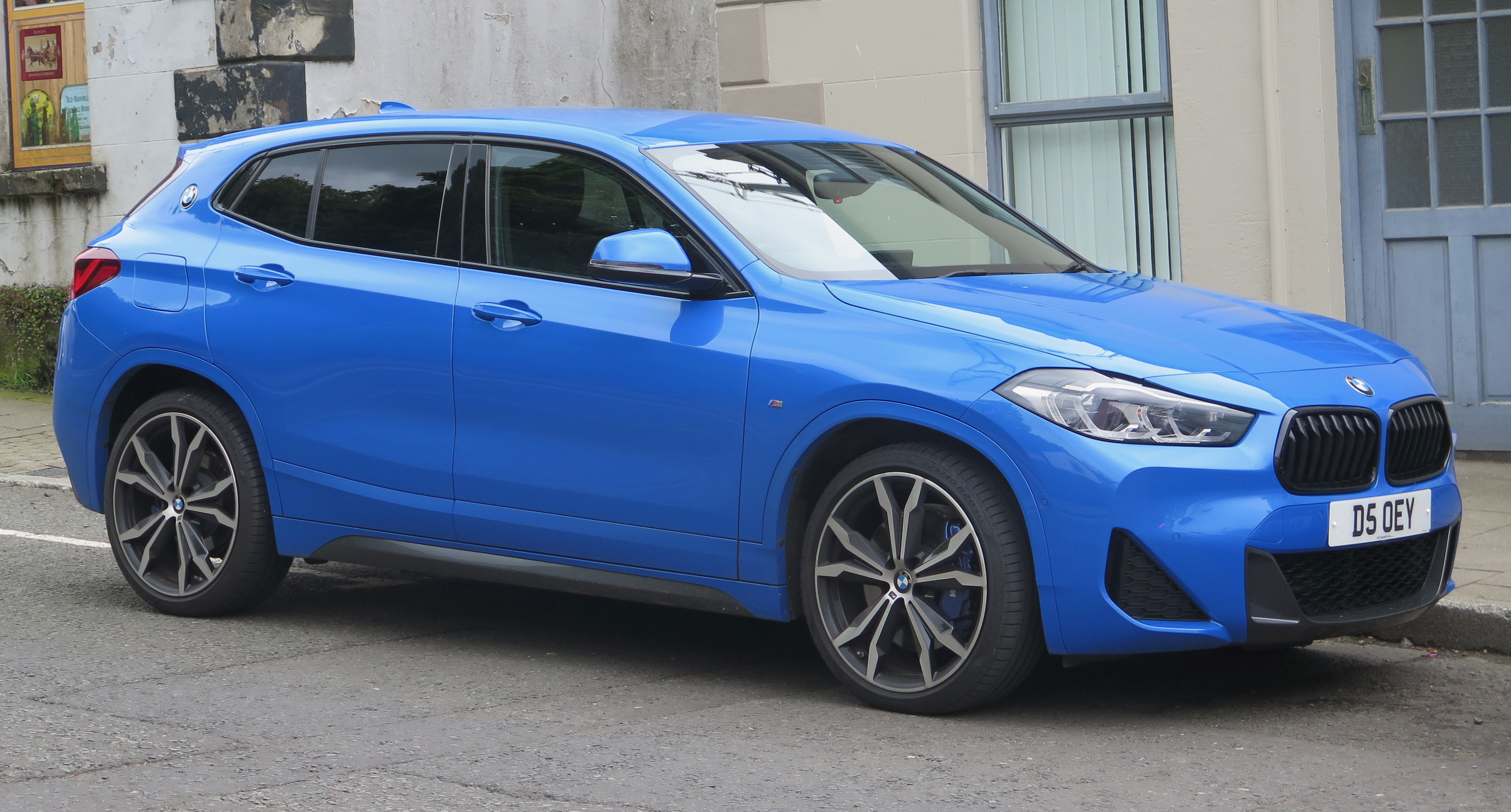

Overview
- Model code: F39
- Production: November 2017 – October 2023
- Model years: 2018–2023
- Assembly: Germany: Regensburg; China: Tiexi, Shenyang (BBA)
- Designer: Sebastian Simm

Body and chassis
- Body style: 5-door SUV
- Platform: BMW UKL2 platform
- Related: BMW 1 Series (F52); BMW 2 Series Active Tourer (F45); BMW X1 (F48); Mini Countryman (F60); Mini Clubman (F54)

Powertrain
- Engine: Petrol: 1.5 L B38 I3 turbo; 2.0 L B48 I4 turbo; Petrol plug-in hybrid: 1.5 L B38A15M0 petrol I3 turbo; Diesel: 1.5 L B37 I3 turbo; 2.0 L B47 I4 turbo
- Electric motor: 70 kW (94 hp) Permanent magnet AC synchronous motor (PHEV)
- Power output: 162 kW (217 hp) (X2 xDrive25e)
- Transmission: 6-speed manual; 8-speed Aisin AW F8F35 automatic; 7-speed DCT
- Hybrid drivetrain: PHEV (X2 xDrive25e)
- Battery: Lithium-ion high-voltage (10.0 kWh)

Dimensions
- Wheelbase: 2,670 mm (105.1 in)
- Length: 4,360 mm (171.7 in)
- Width: 1,824 mm (71.8 in)
- Height: 1,526 mm (60.1 in)
- Kerb weight: 1,460–1,684 kg (3,219–3,713 lb)

The X2 was first previewed as the BMW Concept X2 at the 2016 Paris Motor Show, with a production version unveiled on 25 October 2017, with sales commenced in March 2018.

The X2 F39 is based on the same front-wheel drive UKL2 architecture as the X1 and MINI Countryman, and features the same 2,670 mm (105.1 in) wheelbase length. The X2 is assembled in Regensburg, Germany and is produced alongside the X1. Being a part of BMW X family, the vehicle is also available with xDrive all-wheel drive on higher end models.

Both the sDrive28i and xDrive28i models are available in North American markets.

A plug-in hybrid variant, called the xDrive 25e, was unveiled in January 2020. In September 2020 BMW presented the special variant M Mesh Edition with a sporty look.

Production concluded on 11 October 2023

=== Equipment ===
The X2 is offered in a standard, M Sport, and M Sport X trim. The standard trim features cloth seats, a 6.5-inch iDrive 6.0 screen, and 17-inch wheels, while M Sport and M Sport X models have 19-inch wheels and include dynamic damper control and a 10 mm (0.4 in) lower sports suspension.

Available upgrades include Dakota leather, an upgraded 8.8-inch or 10.25-inch iDrive system with touch controls, wireless charging, a heads up display, and a Driving Assistant package that includes cruise control, lane departure warning, and speed limit information.

sDrive18i and 18d models are available with a 6-speed manual transmission, while sDrive18i models can be upgraded to a 7-speed dual-clutch transmission. The rest of the model range uses an 8-speed automatic transmission.

16-28 models with the M Sport trim and M35 models can be fitted with M Performance Parts. These include black lower bumpers, carbon fibre mirrors, a sport steering wheel and black side skirts.

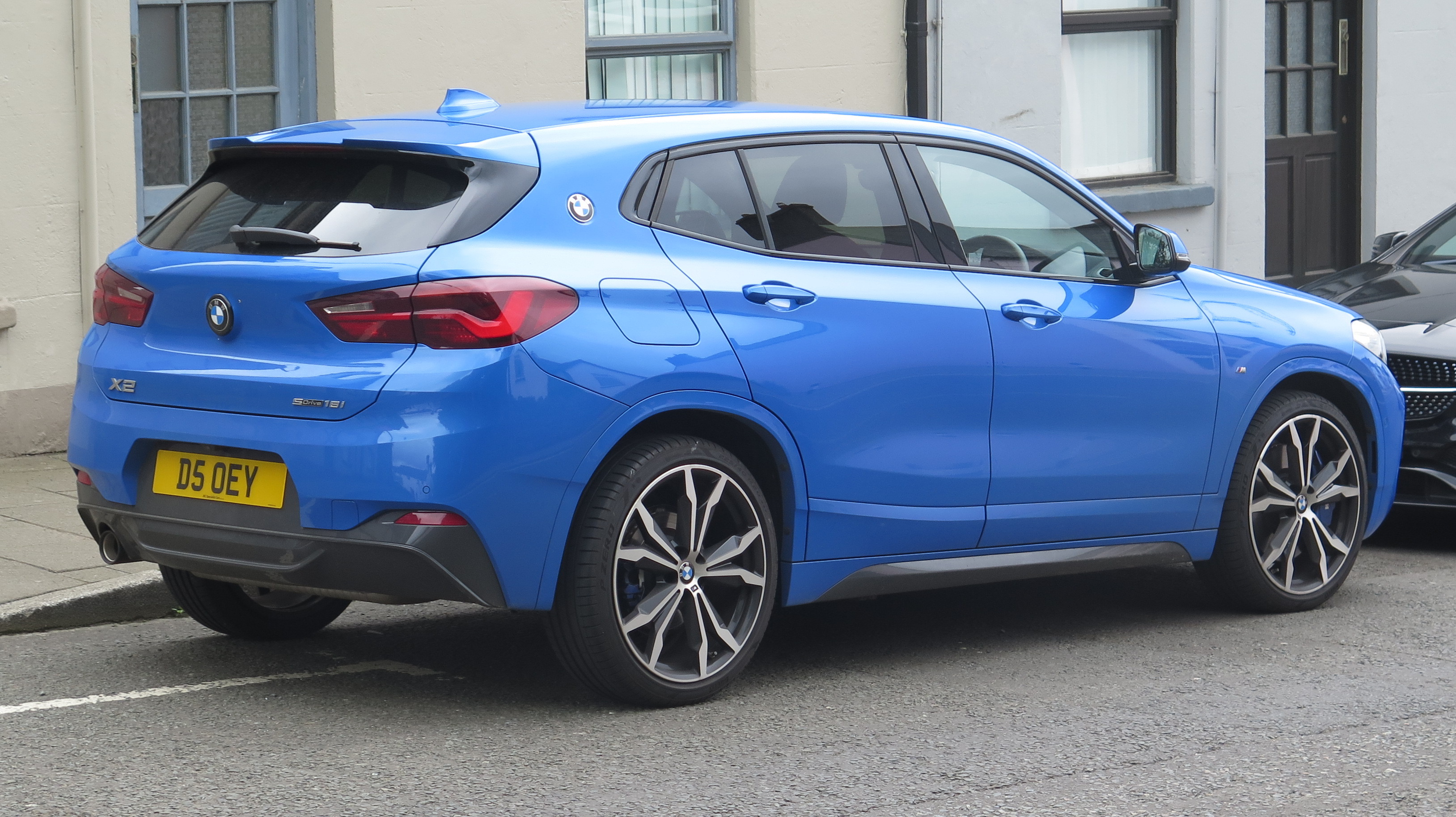
BMW X2 xDrive18i M Sport

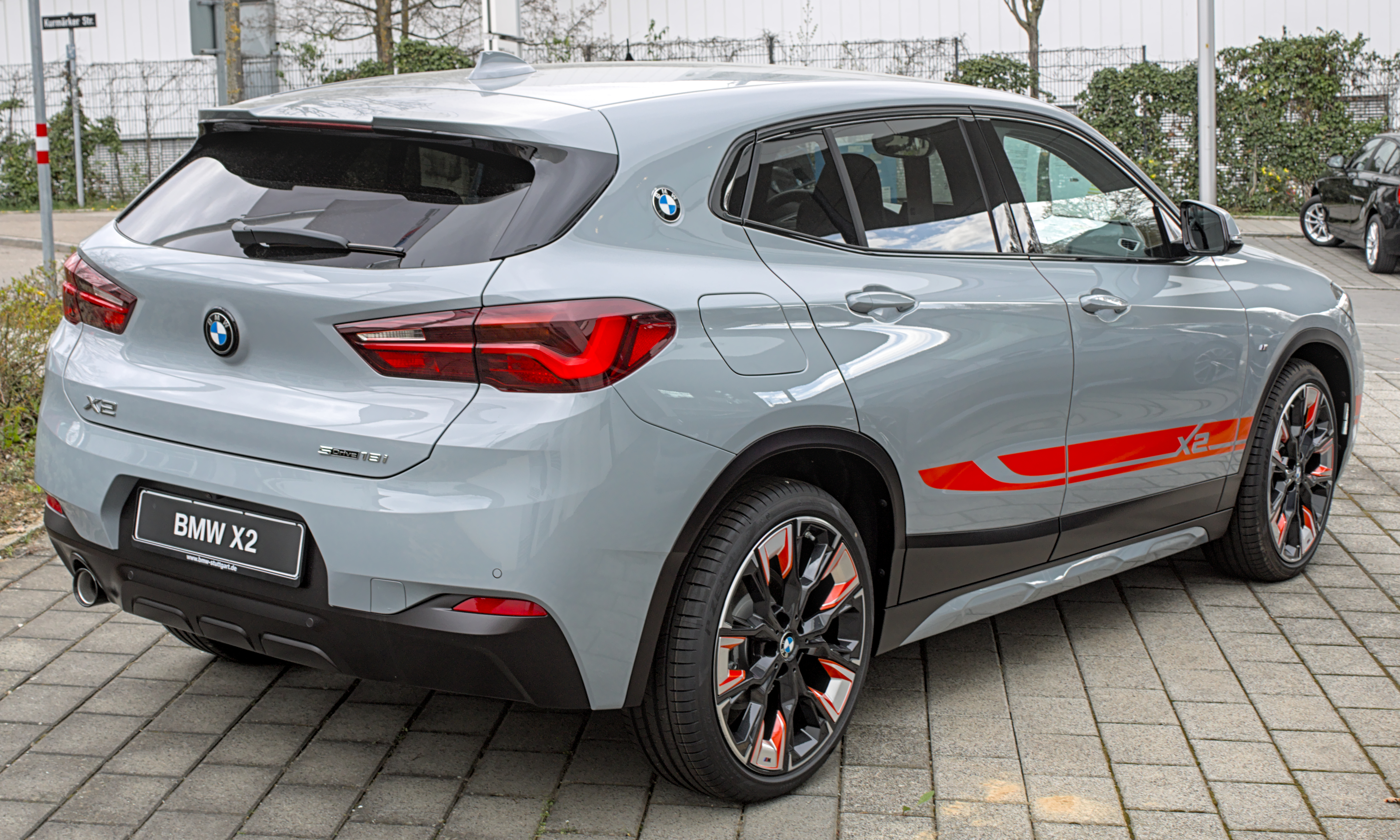
2021 BMW X2 sDrive18i M Mesh Edition

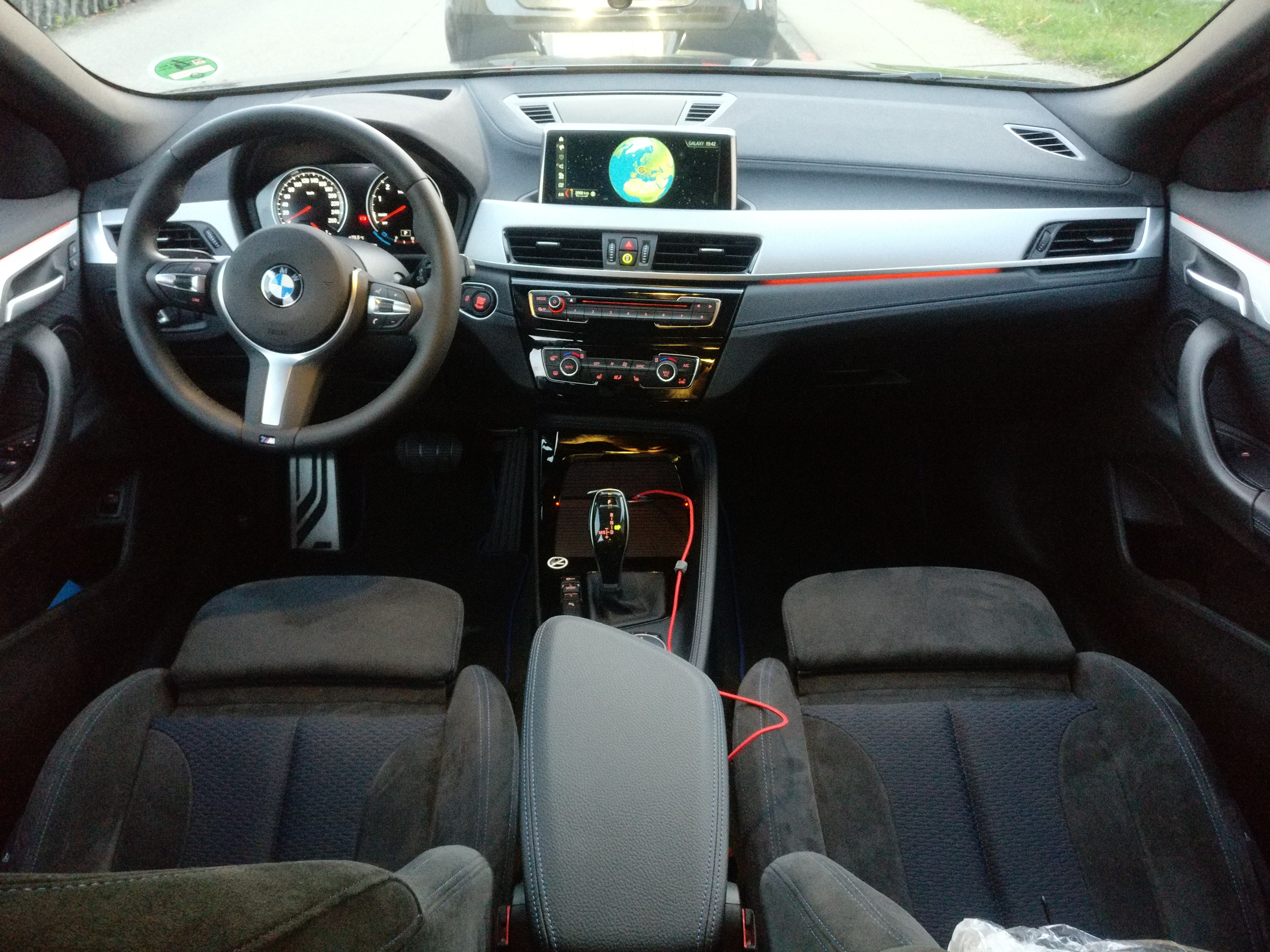
Interior

=== Models ===
==== Petrol engines ====
Model	Years	Engine- turbo	Power	Torque	0–100 km/h (0–62 mph)
sDrive18i	2018–2023	1.5 L B38 straight-3	103 kW (138 hp) at 4600–6500 rpm	220 N⋅m (162 lb⋅ft) at 1480–4200 rpm	9.6 s
sDrive20i	2018–2023	2.0 L B48 straight-4	141 kW (189 hp) at 5000–6000 rpm	280 N⋅m (207 lb⋅ft) at 1350–4600 rpm	7.4 s
xDrive25e	2020–2023	1.5 L B38 straight-3 + electric motor	168 kW (225 hp)	385 N⋅m (284 lb⋅ft)	6.8 s
sDrive28i	2018–2023	2.0 L B48 straight-4	170 kW (228 hp) at 5000 rpm	350 N⋅m (258 lb⋅ft) at 1250–4500 rpm	6.5 s
xDrive28i	2018–2023	2.0 L B48 straight-4	170 kW (228 hp) at 5000 rpm	350 N⋅m (258 lb⋅ft) at 1250–4500 rpm	6.4 s
M35i	2018–2023	2.0 L B48 straight-4	225 kW (302 hp) at 5000–6250 rpm	450 N⋅m (332 lb⋅ft) at 1750–4500 rpm	4.7 s

==== Diesel engines ====
Model	Years	Engine- turbo	Power	Torque	0–100 km/h (0-62 mph)
sDrive16d	2019–2023	1.5 L B37 straight-3	85 kW (114 hp) at 4000 rpm	270 N⋅m (199 lb⋅ft) at 1750–2250 rpm	11.5 s
sDrive18d	2018–2023	2.0 L B47 straight-4	110 kW (148 hp) at 4000 rpm	350 N⋅m (258 lb⋅ft) at 1750–2500 rpm	9.3 s
xDrive20d	2018–2023	2.0 L B47 straight-4	140 kW (188 hp) at 4000 rpm	400 N⋅m (295 lb⋅ft) at 1750–2500 rpm	7.7 s
xDrive25d	2018–2023	2.0 L B47 straight-4	170 kW (228 hp) at 4400 rpm	450 N⋅m (332 lb⋅ft) at 1500–3000 rpm	6.7 s

=== Awards ===
- 2017 iF Design Award for 'Mobility/Professional Concept' category
- 2018 EyesOn Design Awards for 'Best Vehicle Harmonization'
- 2018 EyesOn Design Awards for 'Best Production Vehicle'

=== Safety ===
ANCAP test results* BMW X2 all variants (2015, aligned with Euro NCAP)
Test	Points	%
Overall:	5 /5 stars	
Adult occupant:	34.4	90%
Child occupant:	43	87%
Pedestrian:	26.7	74%
Safety assist:	9.1	70%

=== BMW Concept X2 ===
The BMW Concept X2 is the concept car that preceded the introduction of the production version of the X2.

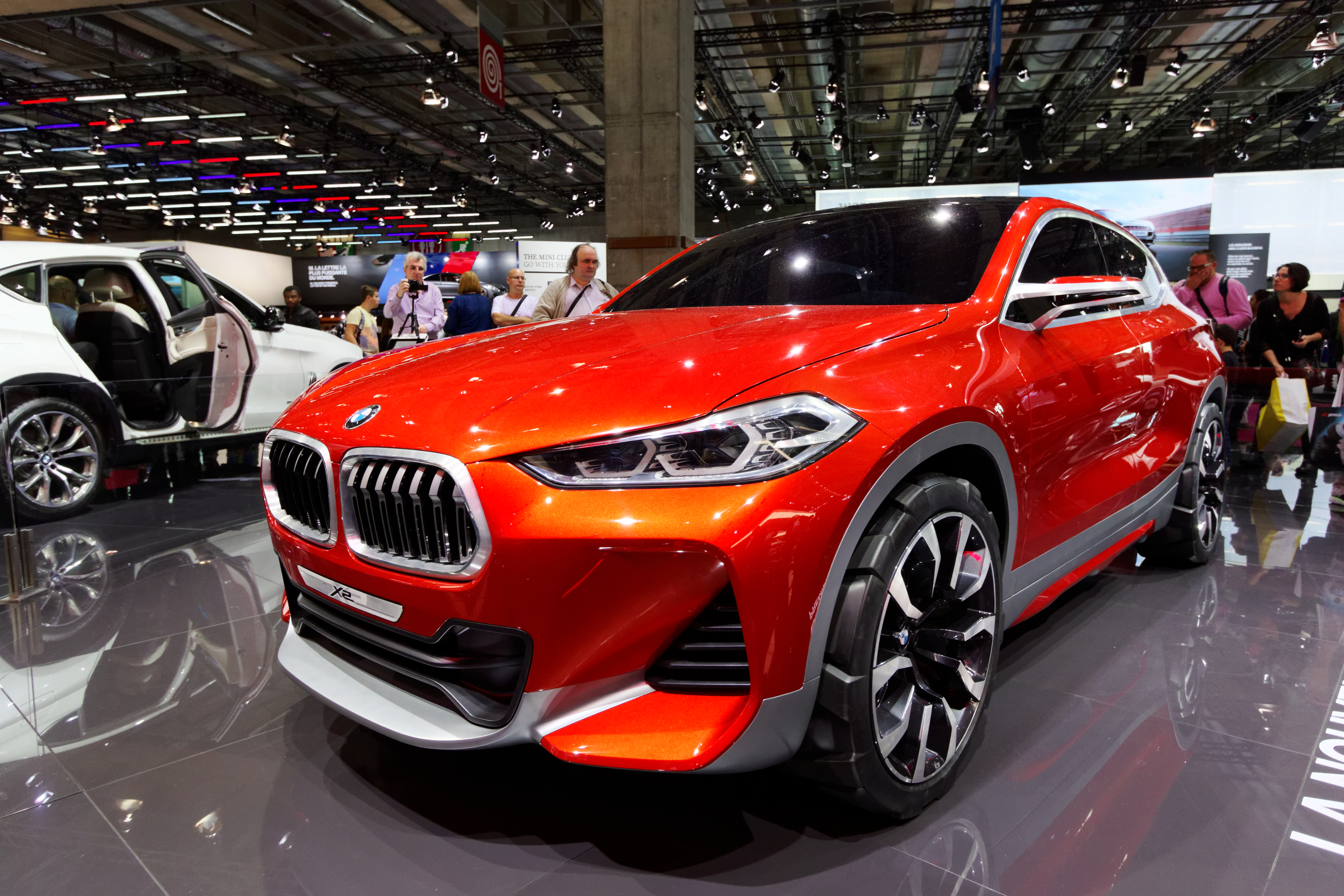
Front view

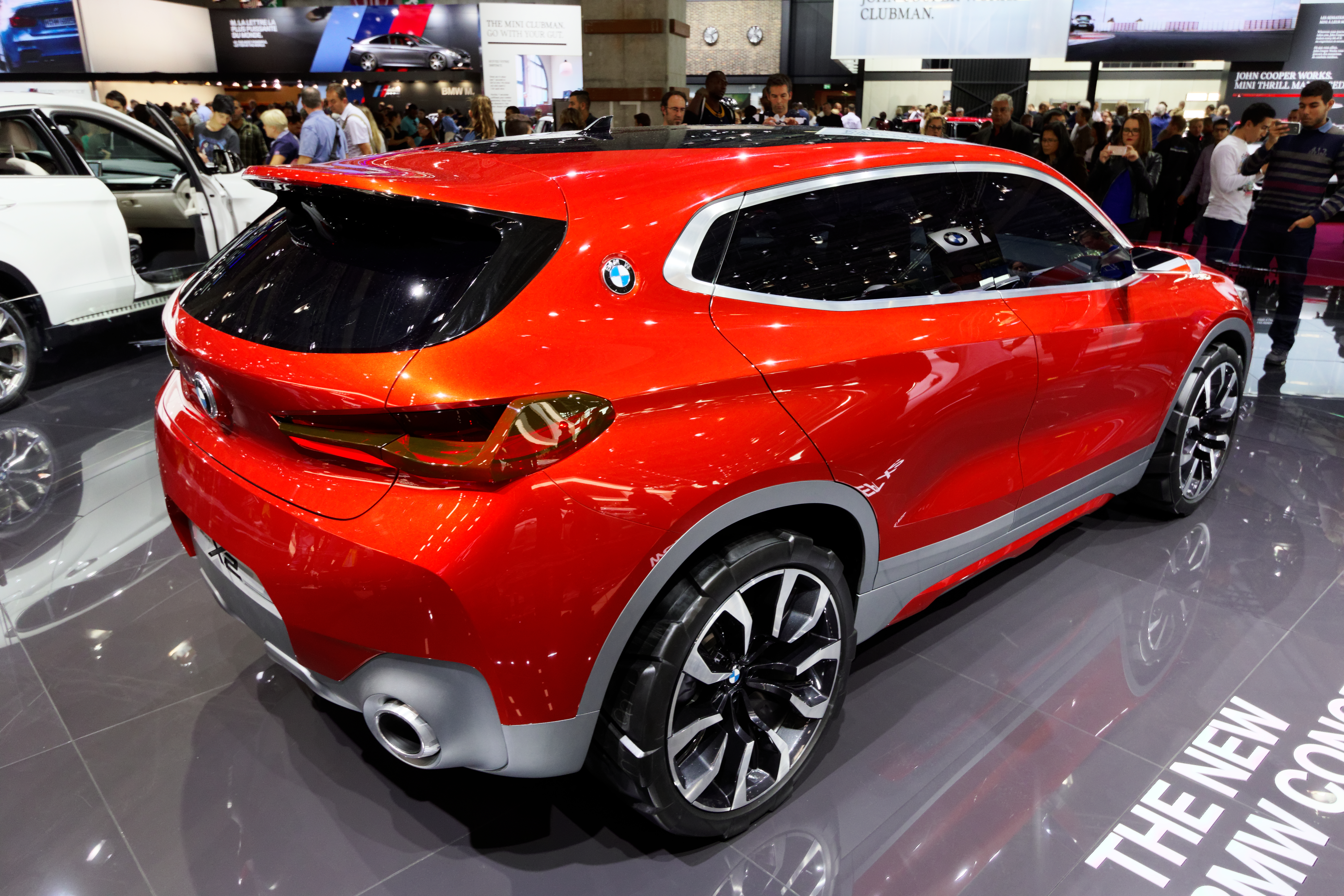
Rear view

== Second generation (U10; 2023) ==
Second generation
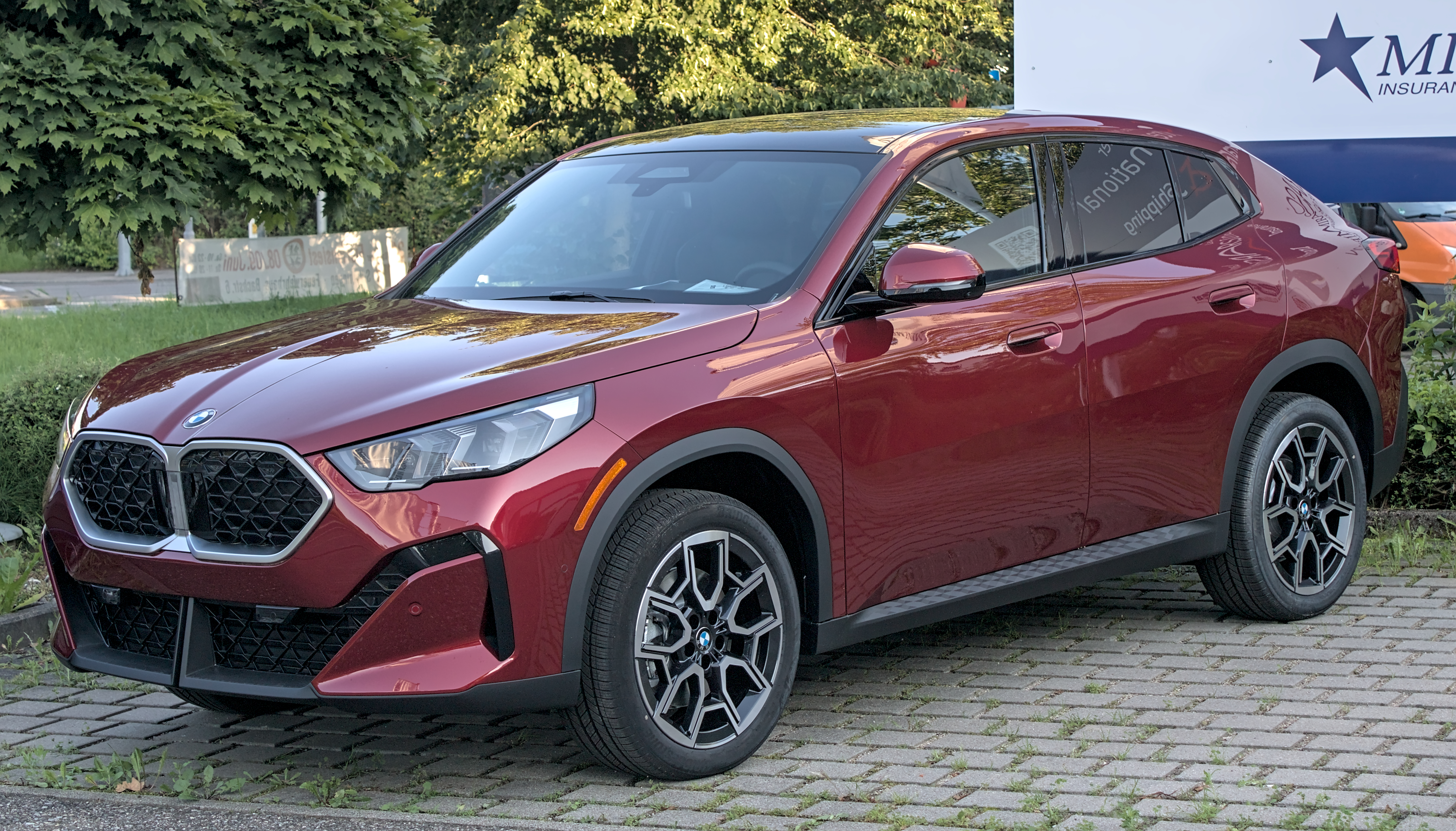
- BMW X2 sDrive20i

Overview
- Model code: U10
- Also called: BMW iX2 (electric version)
- Production: November 2023–present
- Model years: 2024–present
- Assembly: Germany: Regensburg
- Designer: Ernest Tsarukyan

Body and chassis
- Body style: 5-door coupe SUV
- Platform: BMW UKL2 platform
- Related: BMW X1 (U11)

Powertrain
- Engine: Petrol: 1.5 L B38 turbo I3 mild hybrid; 2.0 L B48 turbo I4; Diesel: 2.0 L B47 turbo I4; 2.0 L B47 turbo I4 mild hybrid
- Electric motor: 48V power booster (MHEV); 1 or 2 BMW eDrive 5.0 O170SF/M170SF permanently excited synchronous motors (PSM) (iX2 eDrive20/xDrive30)
- Transmission: 7-speed Steptronic automatic; Single-speed automatic (iX2)
- Hybrid drivetrain: Mild Hybrid (MHEV)
- Battery: 64.8 kWh lithium-ion (iX2)
- Electric range: 449–478 km (279–297 mi)

Dimensions
- Wheelbase: 2,692 mm (106.0 in)
- Length: 4,554 mm (179.3 in)
- Width: 1,845 mm (72.6 in)
- Height: 1,590 mm (62.6 in)
- Kerb weight: 1,645–2,095 kg (3,627–4,619 lb)

Ahead of the official reveal, the high-performance M35i was teased on social media, showing off details such as its illuminated grille, large wheels and four round tailpipes. It was fully revealed on 11 October 2023, with the introduction of the first ever battery-electric iX2 model. Both models went on sale in early 2024. The BMW X2 and iX2 was presented to the public at the Japan Mobility Show in Tokyo on 26 October 2023. Deliveries to US showrooms started in March 2024.

Compared to its predecessor, it has a sloping roofline similar to the X6. The exterior has BMW kidney grilles in a hexagonal shape which has the option of BMW Iconic Glow contour lighting, LED rear lights with dual arrow light patterns which also mirrors the LED daytime running lights of the headlights, and first compact BMW to be available with 21-inch alloy wheels.

The interior has BMW Curved Display which houses the 10.25-inch digital instrument cluster and 10.7-inch touchscreen infotainment system (operated by BMW's Operating System 9) with QuickSelect functions, a gear selector switch for the automatic transmission, and the omission of the iDrive control wheel (like in other entry-level BMW models).

The X2 M35i xDrive models features a 15mm lowered suspension, an Adaptive M suspension with sports steering, an M Compound braking system, M-specific design elements for the exterior and interior, and a quad exhaust system.

=== Gallery ===
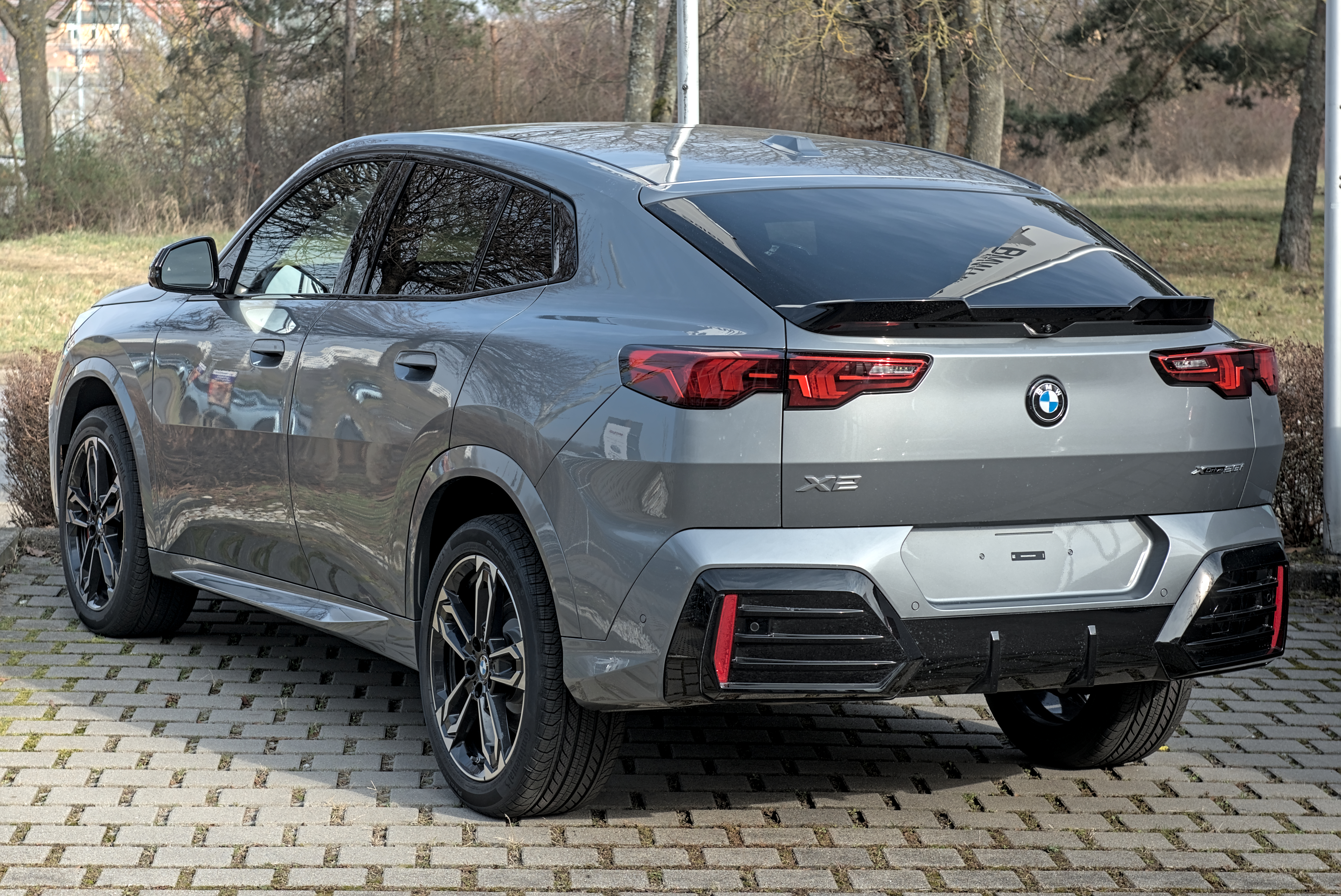
Rear view with M Sport Package

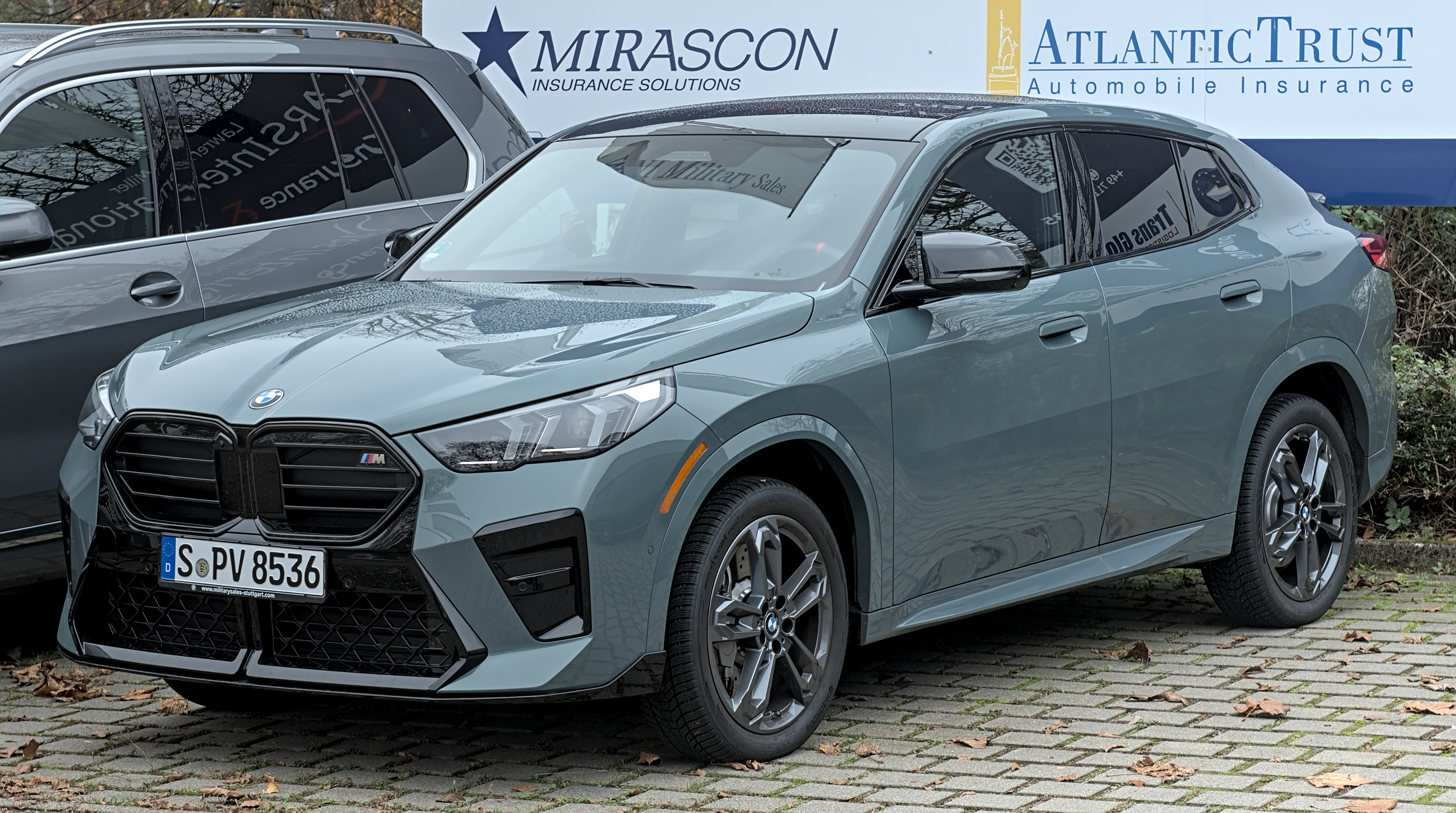
BMW X2 M35i

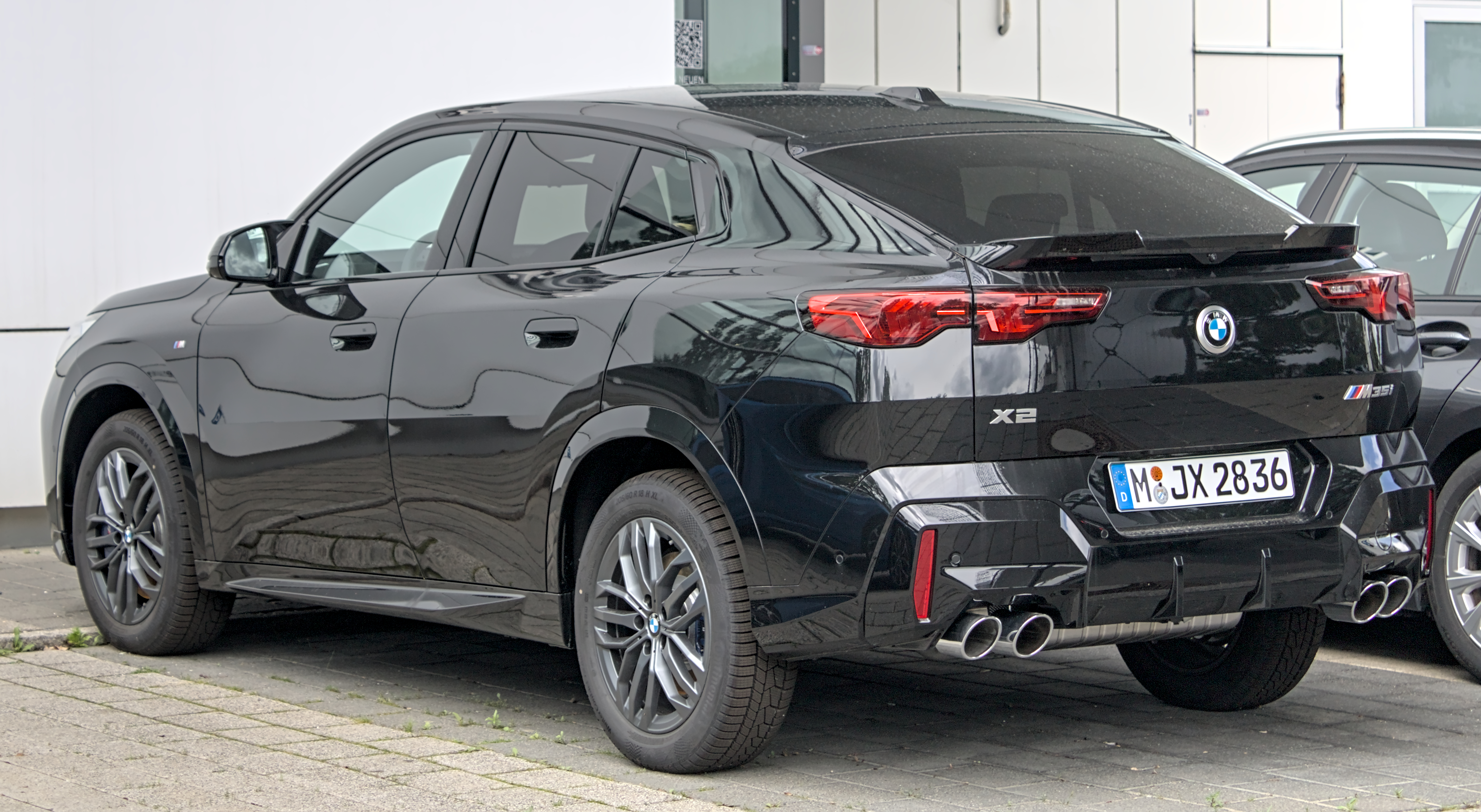
Rear view (M35i)

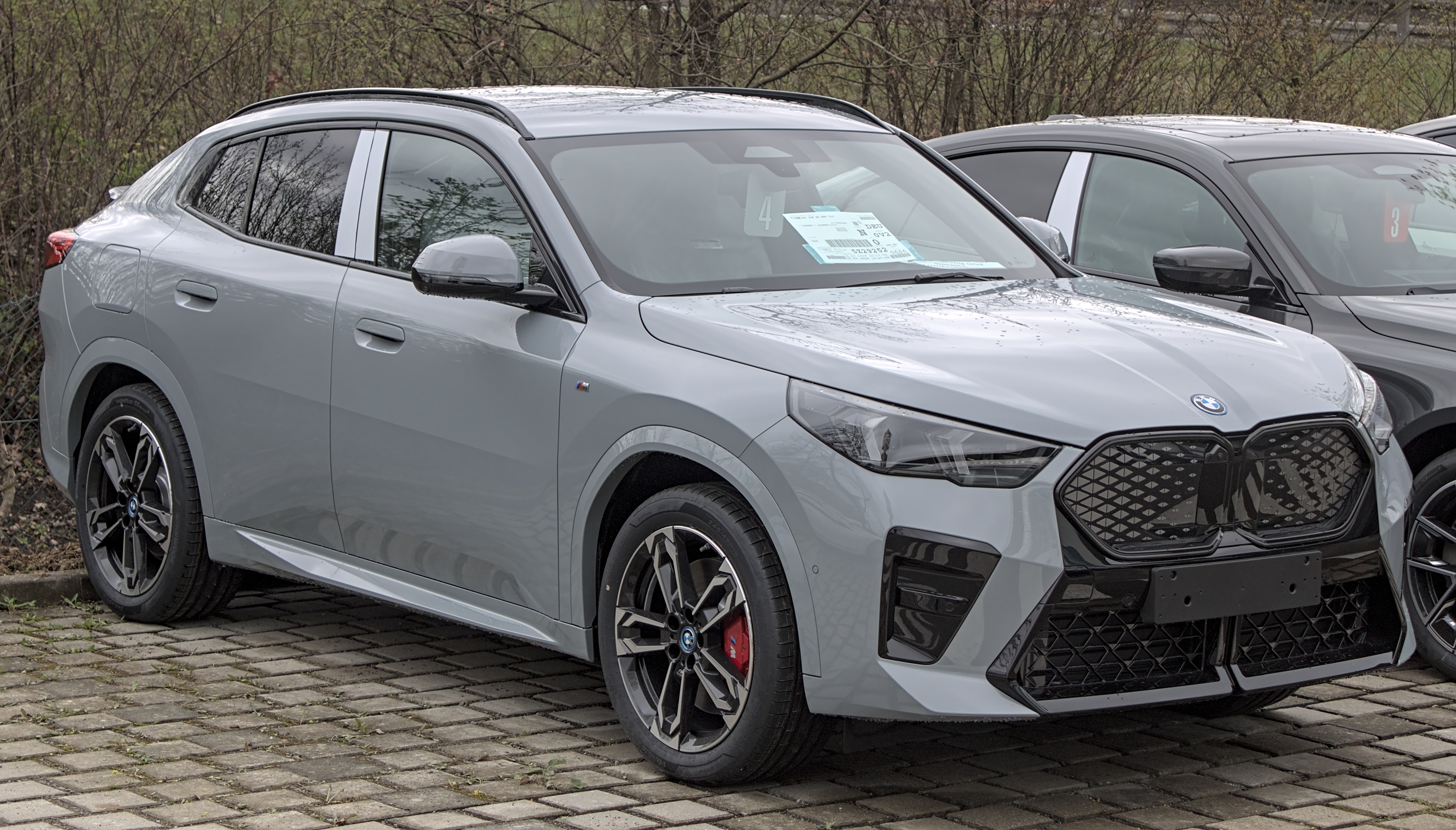
BMW iX2 with M Sport Package

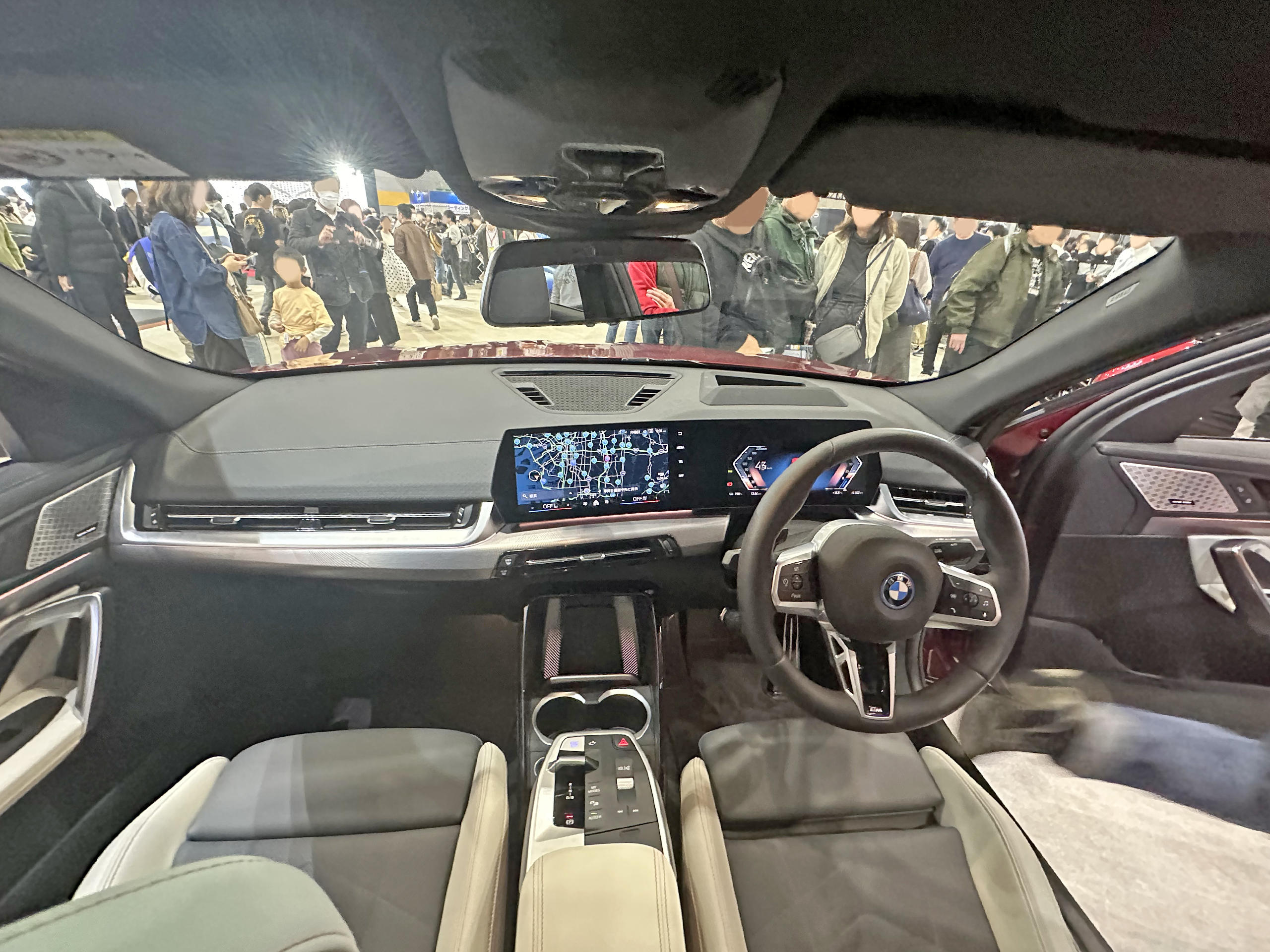
Interior

=== Powertrains ===
Model	Fuel type	Engine code	Displacement	Power	Torque	Transmission	Electric motor	Battery	Top Speed	Acceleration 0–100km/h (0–62mph)	Layout
sDrive20i	Petrol mild hybrid	B38	1.5 L (1,499 cc) I3 turbo	125 kW (170 PS; 168 hp) Motor: 14 kW (19 hp; 19 PS)	280 N⋅m (207 lb⋅ft)	7-speed Steptronic automatic	48 V power booster	0.9 kWh Lithium-ion	213 km/h (132 mph)	8.3 s	FWD
xDrive28i	Petrol	B48	2.0 L (1,998 cc) I4 turbo	180 kW (245 PS; 241 hp)	400 N⋅m (295 lb⋅ft)	7-speed Steptronic automatic	-	-	210 km/h (130 mph)	6.2 s	AWD
M35i xDrive*	Petrol	B48	2.0 L (1,998 cc) I4 turbo	221 kW (300 PS; 296 hp)	400 N⋅m (295 lb⋅ft)	7-speed Steptronic automatic	-	-	250 km/h (155 mph)	5.4 s	AWD
sDrive18d	Diesel	B47	2.0 L (1,995 cc) I4 turbo	110 kW (150 PS; 148 hp)	360 N⋅m (266 lb⋅ft)	7-speed Steptronic automatic	-	-	210 km/h (130 mph)	8.9 s	FWD
sDrive20d	Diesel mild hybrid	B47	2.0 L (1,995 cc) I4 turbo	120 kW (163 PS; 161 hp) Motor: 15 kW (20 hp; 20 PS)	400 N⋅m (295 lb⋅ft) Motor: 55 N⋅m (40.6 lbf⋅ft)	7-speed Steptronic automatic	48 V power booster	0.9 kWh Lithium-ion	210 km/h (130 mph)	8.5 s	FWD
xDrive20d	Diesel mild hybrid	B47	2.0 L (1,995 cc) I4 turbo	120 kW (163 PS; 161 hp) Motor: 15 kW (20 hp; 20 PS)	400 N⋅m (295 lb⋅ft) Motor: 55 N⋅m (40.6 lbf⋅ft)	7-speed Steptronic automatic	48 V power booster	0.9 kWh Lithium-ion	210 km/h (130 mph)	8.5 s	AWD
eDrive20	Electric	–	–	150 kW (204 PS; 201 hp)	247 N⋅m (182 lb⋅ft)	1-speed reduction gear	Permanent-magnet synchronous	66.5 kWh Lithium-ion	170 km/h (106 mph)	8.6 s	FWD
xDrive30	Electric	–	–	230 kW (313 PS; 308 hp)	494 N⋅m (364 lb⋅ft)	1-speed reduction gear	Permanent-magnet synchronous	66.5 kWh Lithium-ion	180 km/h (112 mph)	5.6 s	AWD

*= 233 kW (317 PS; 312 hp) for selected countries outside EU market.

== Production and sales ==
Year	Production	Sales		
Year	Production	Europe	U.S.	China
2017		245		
2018	67,576	36,484	16,154	
2019	91,812	45,126	11,293	
2020	74,229	32,745	7,387	
2021	N/A (Note: Starting in 2021, BMW Group combined total deliveries of the X1 and X2 in its annual report.)	28,699	6,565	
2022	N/A		2,641	
2023	N/A		191	16,599
2024	N/A		3,619	7,623
2025	N/A		6,739	7,077

== See also ==
- List of BMW vehicles
