= BMW UKL platform =

German automobile platform

Overview
- Manufacturer: BMW
- Parent company: BMW Group
- Production: 2014–present

Body and chassis
- Class: Subcompact car Compact car
- Layout: Front-engine, front-wheel-drive Front-engine, all-wheel-drive

The UKL platform (Untere Klasse, "lower class" in German) is a modular automobile platform developed by German car manufacturer BMW. It is a modular architecture to suit a range of front-wheel-drive and all-wheel drive models. The first production vehicle to use the UKL platform was the 2014 Mini Hatch.

The objective of the front-wheel-drive UKL platform is to offer smaller models with a large interior space, with enough room for passengers in the rear seats and large cargo space. These objectives are only possible to achieve by mounting transverse three or four-cylinder engines. At the time of release, BMW announced that any model under 4.5 m (177 in) in length and smaller than a 3 Series will make use of the UKL platform. According to Ian Robertson, BMW sales and marketing chief, "One of the big advantages of UKL is that we are able to launch a lot of products almost simultaneously because we are doing the engineering at once."

The UKL platform was developed into the UKL1 and UKL2 platforms under FAAR umbrella with pure ICE, hybrid and electric powertrains.

== UKL platform ==
Vehicles using platform (calendar years):

- Mini Hatch (F56) (2014–2024)
- Mini Hatch 5-door (F55) (2014–2024)
- Mini Convertible (F57) (2016–2024)
- BMW X1 (F48) (2015–2022)
- BMW 2 Series Active Tourer (F45) (2014–2021)
- BMW 2 Series Gran Tourer (F46) (2015–2021)
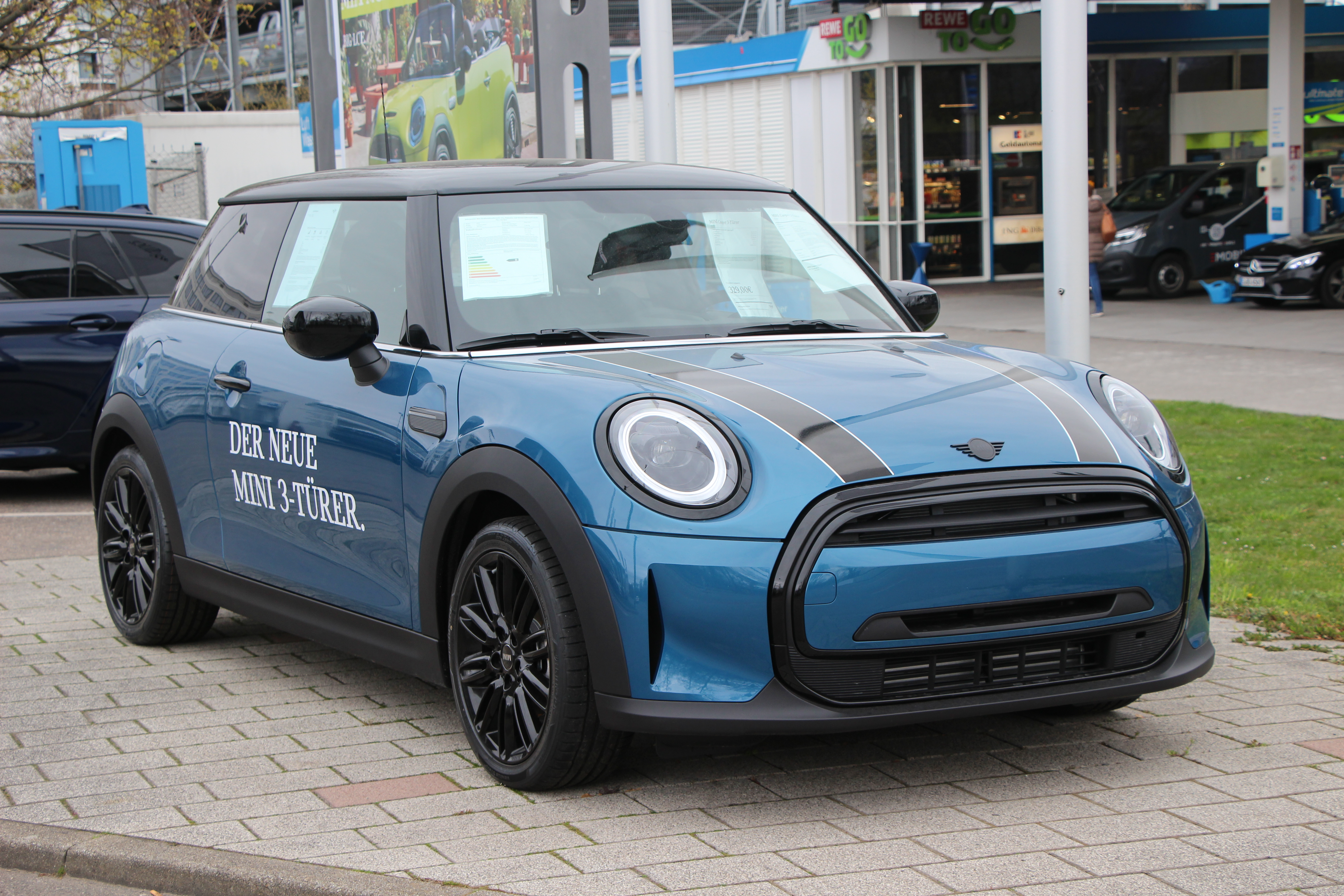
Mini Hatch (F56)

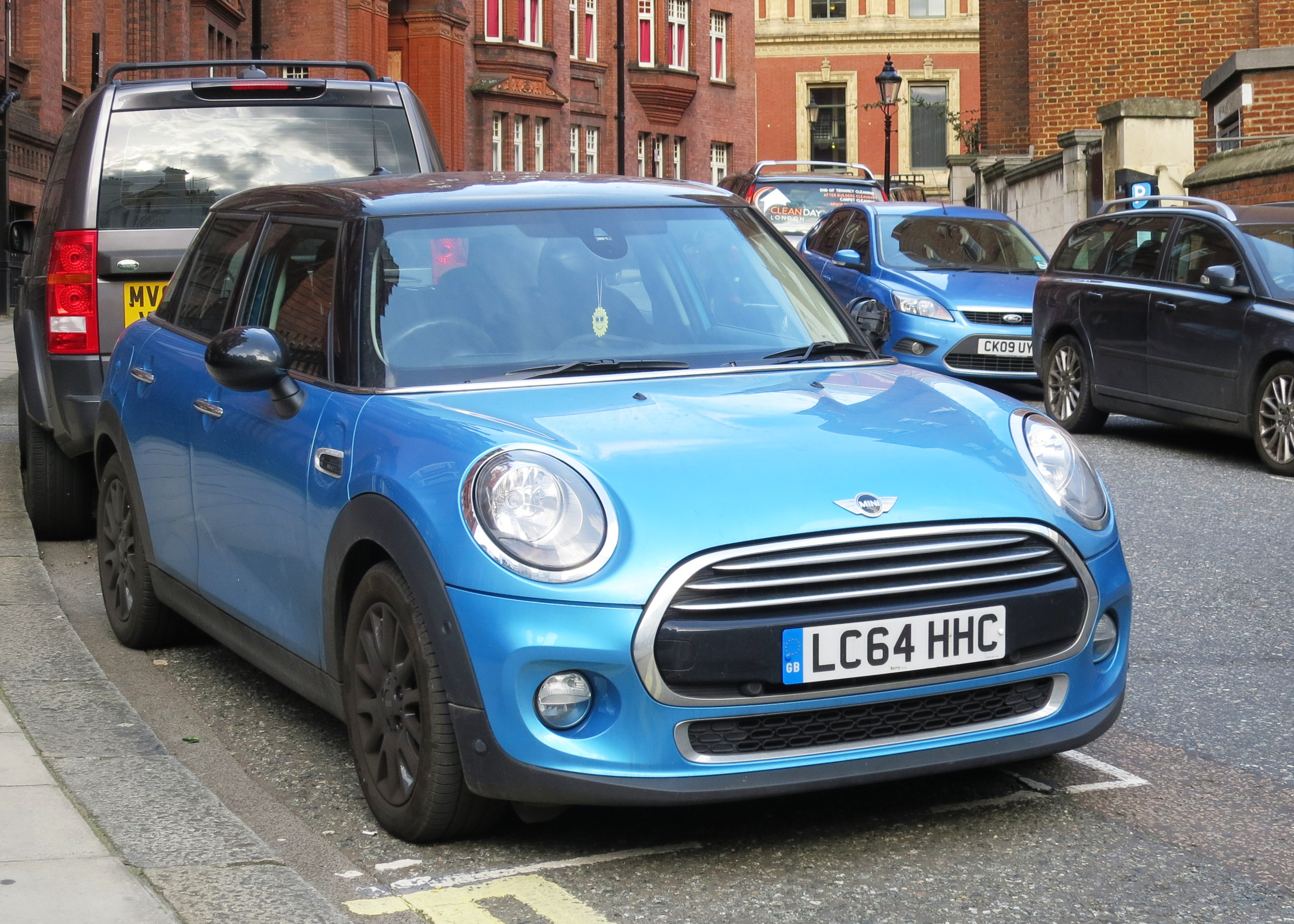
Mini Hatch 5-door (F55)

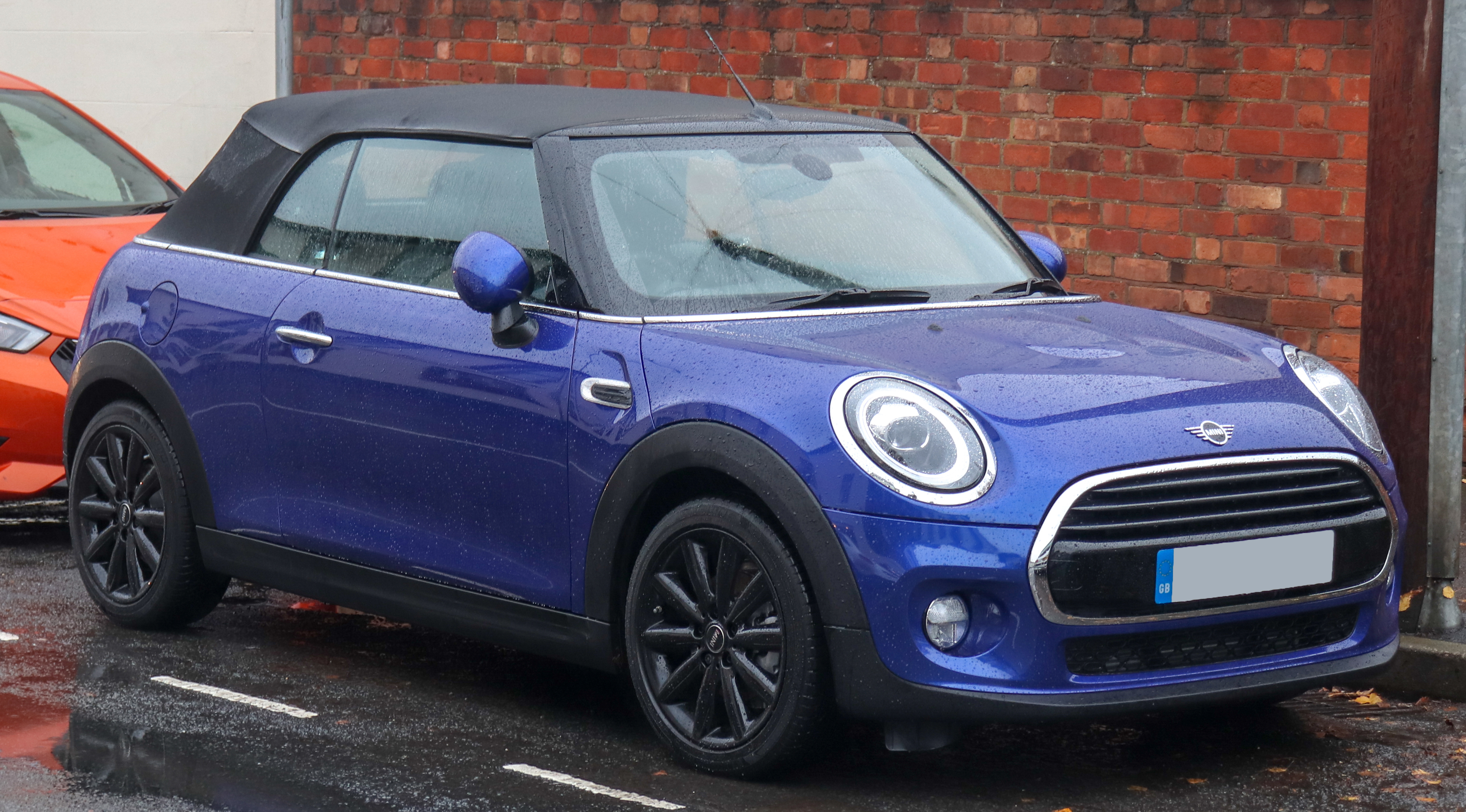
Mini Convertible (F57)

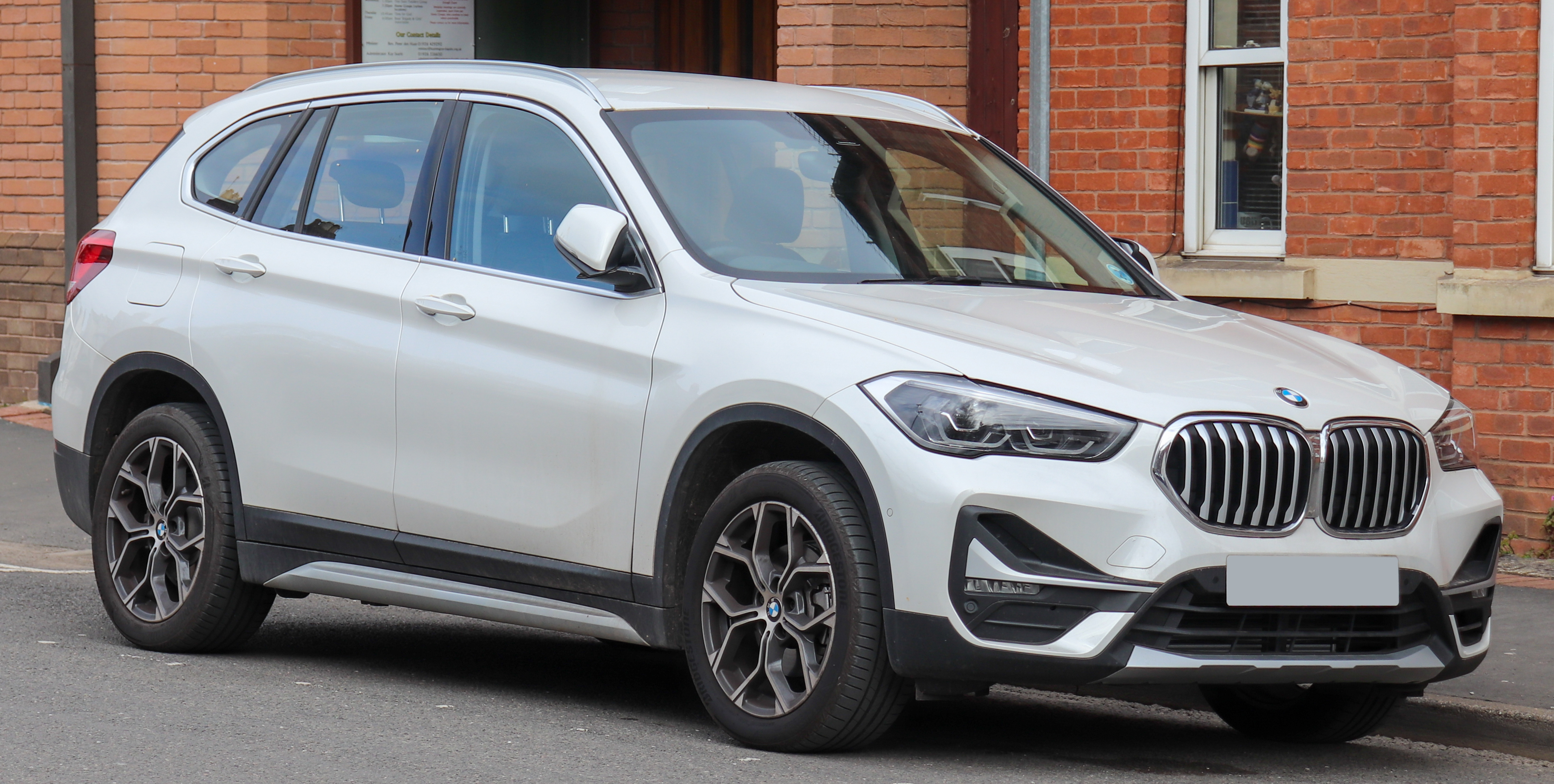
BMW X1 (F48)

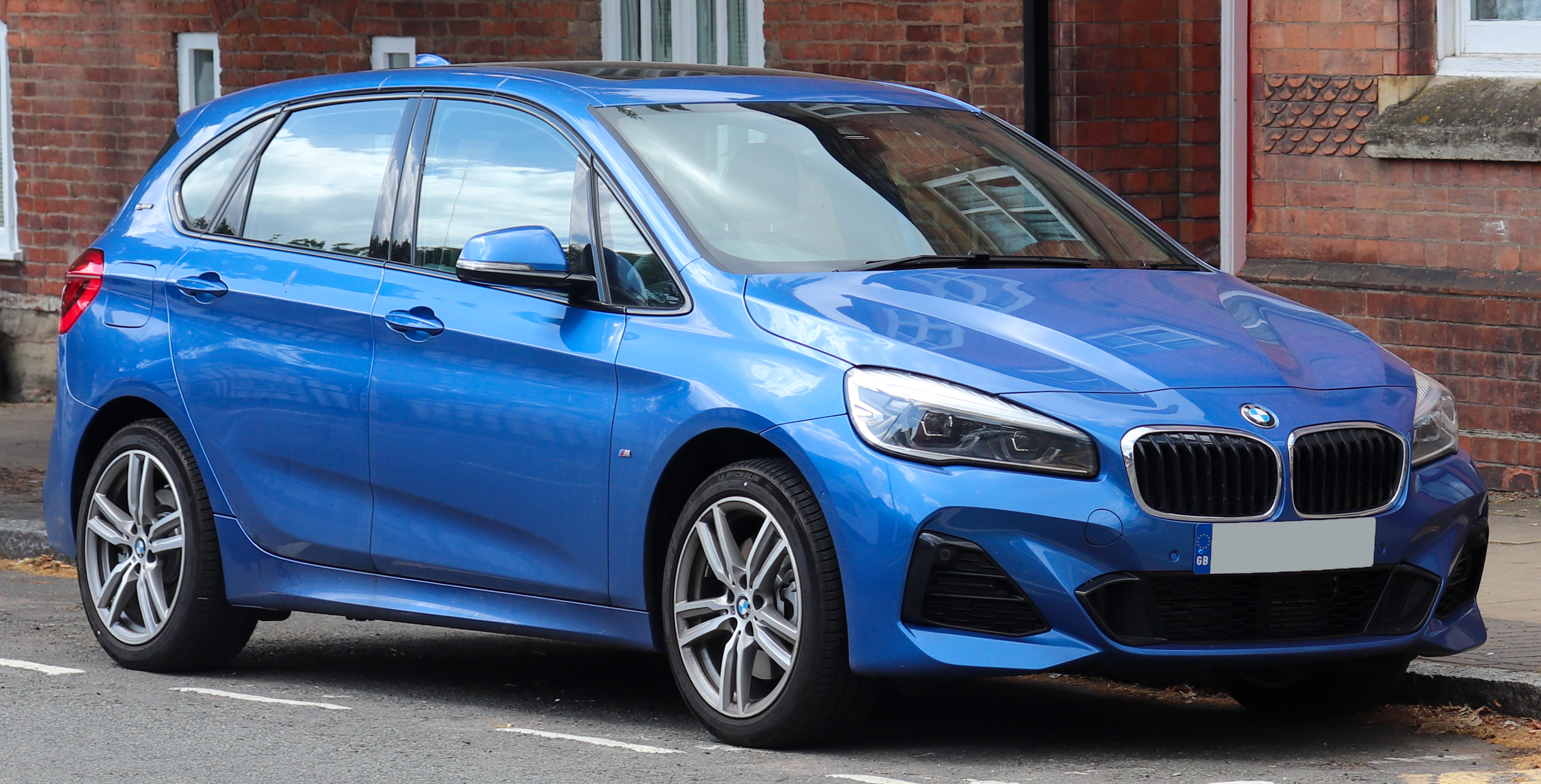
BMW 2 Series Active Tourer (F45)

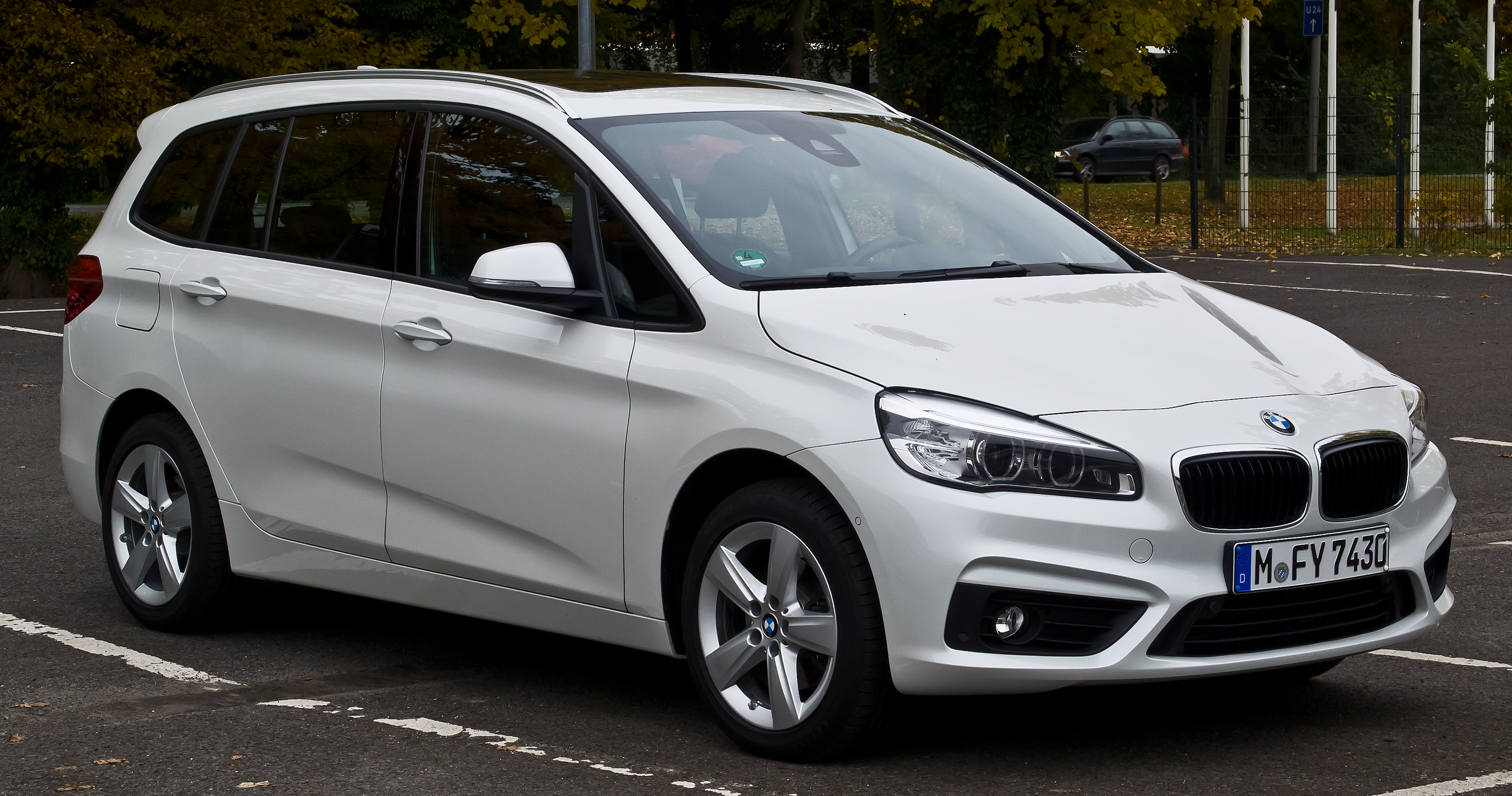
BMW 2 Series Gran Tourer (F46)

== UKL1 platform ==
- Mini Hatch (F66) (2024–present)
- Mini Hatch 5-door (F65) (2024–present)
- Mini Convertible (F67) (2024–present)
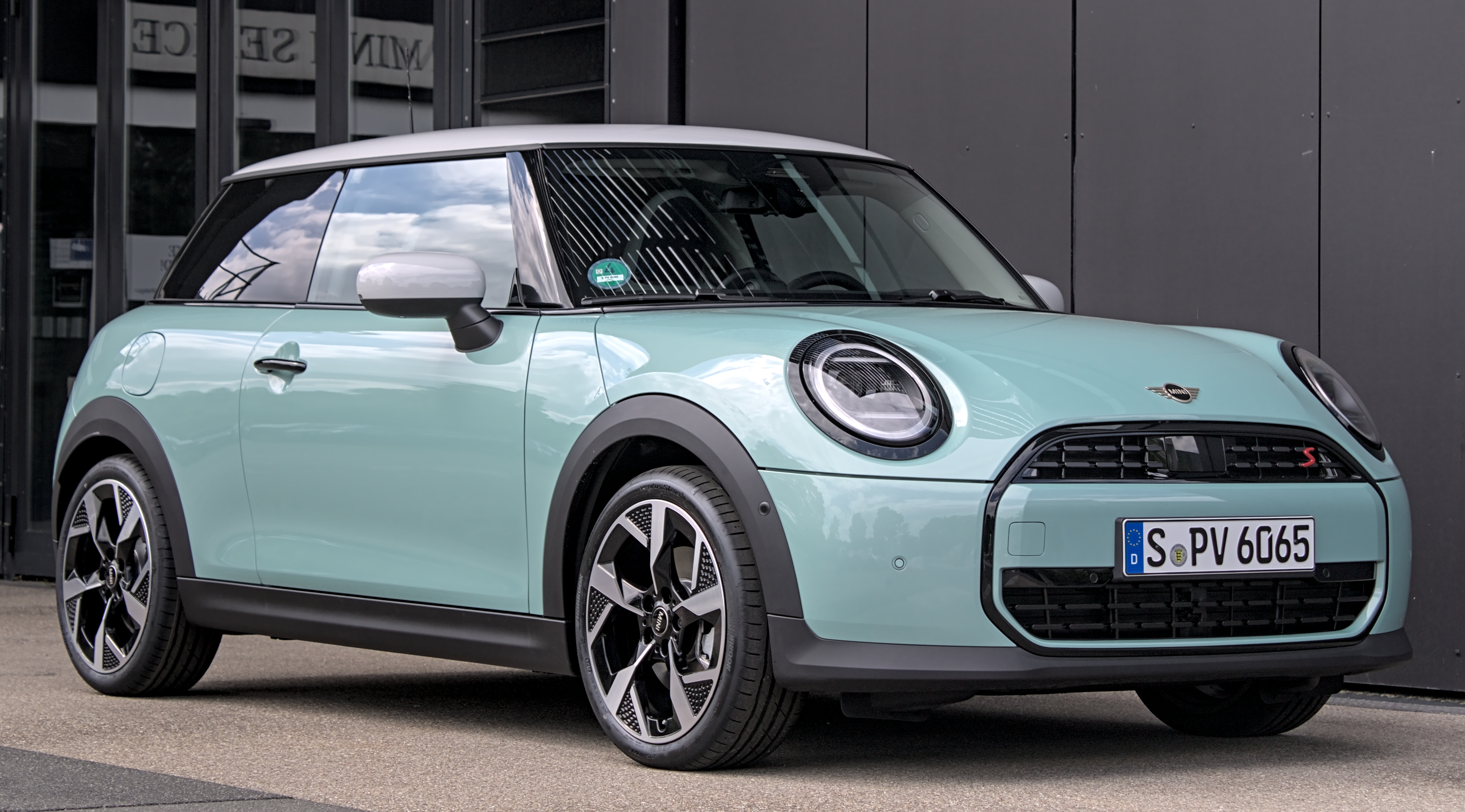
Mini Hatch (F66)

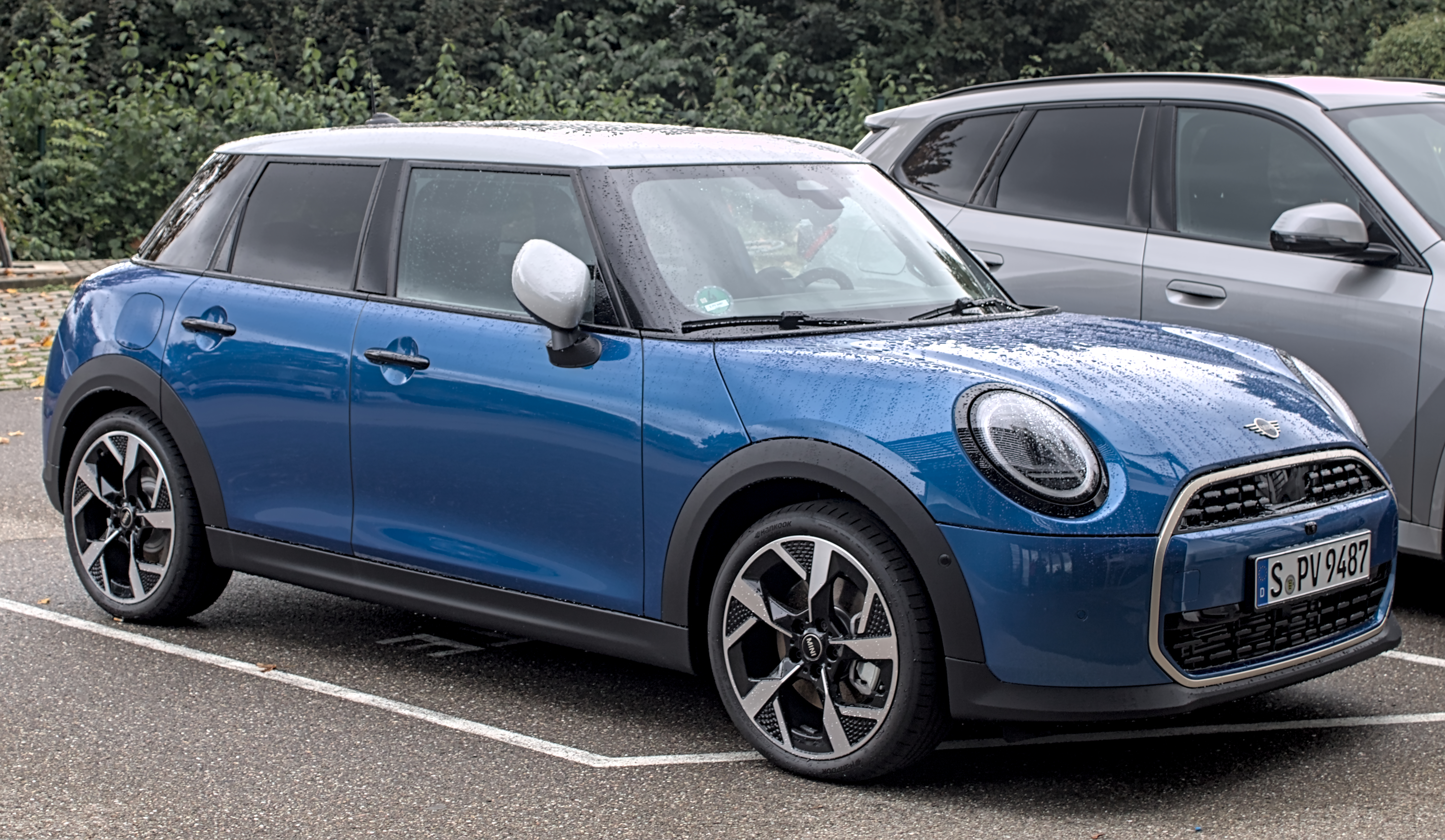
Mini Hatch 5-door (F65)

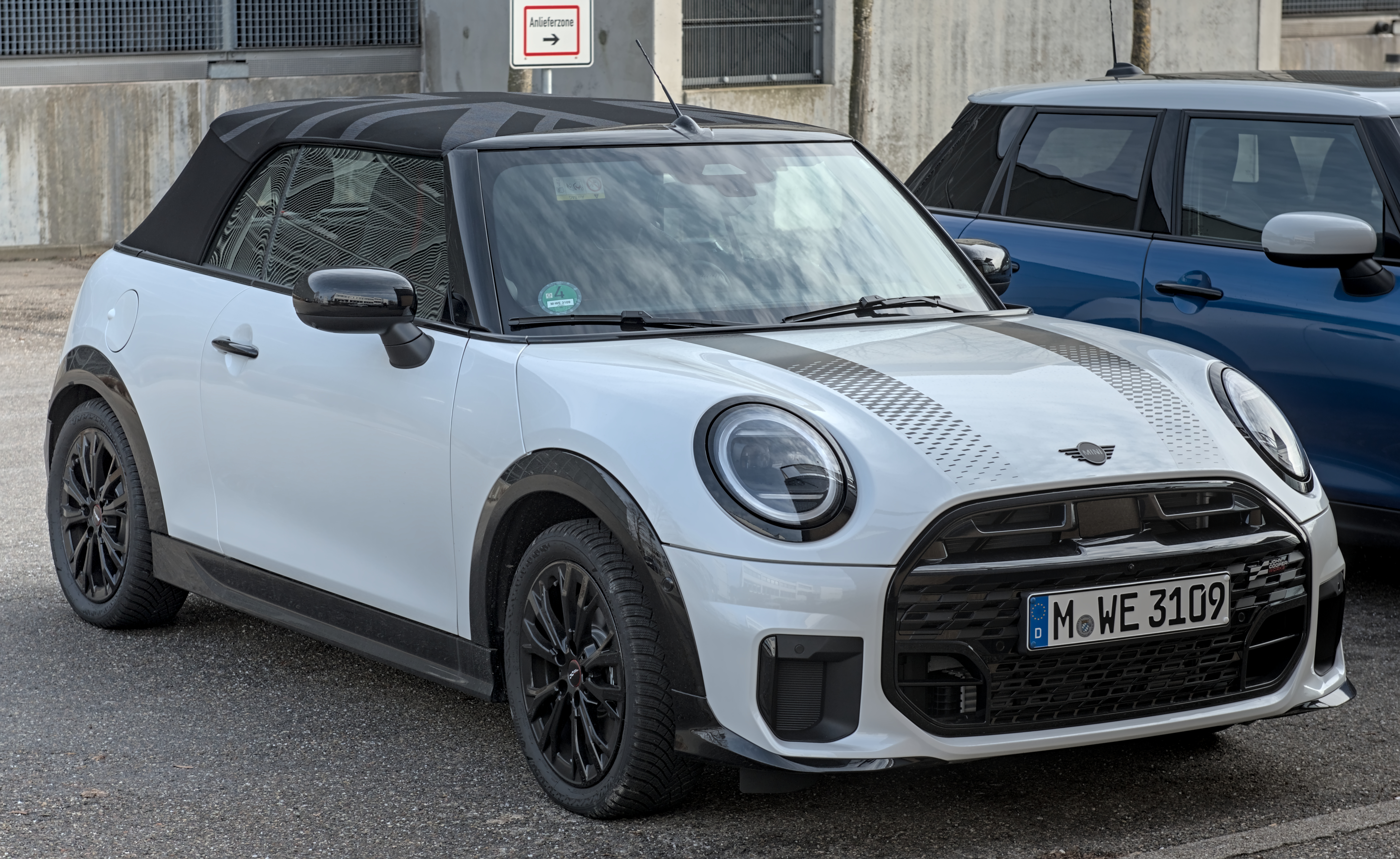
Mini Convertible (F67)

== UKL2 platform ==
Vehicles using platform (calendar years):

- BMW 1 Series Sedan (F52) (2017–2023)
- BMW 1 Series (F40) (2019–2024)
- BMW 1 Series (F70) (2024–present)
- BMW 2 Series Gran Coupé (F44) (2020–2024)
- BMW 2 Series Gran Coupé (F74) (2024–present)
- BMW 2 Series Active Tourer (U06) (2021–present)
- BMW X1 (U11) (2022–present)
- BMW X2 (F39) (2017–2022)
- BMW X2 (U10) (2023–present)
- Mini Countryman (F60) (2017–2023)
- Mini Countryman (U25) (2023–present)
- Mini Clubman (F54) (2016–2024)
- Zinoro 60H (F48) (2017–2020)
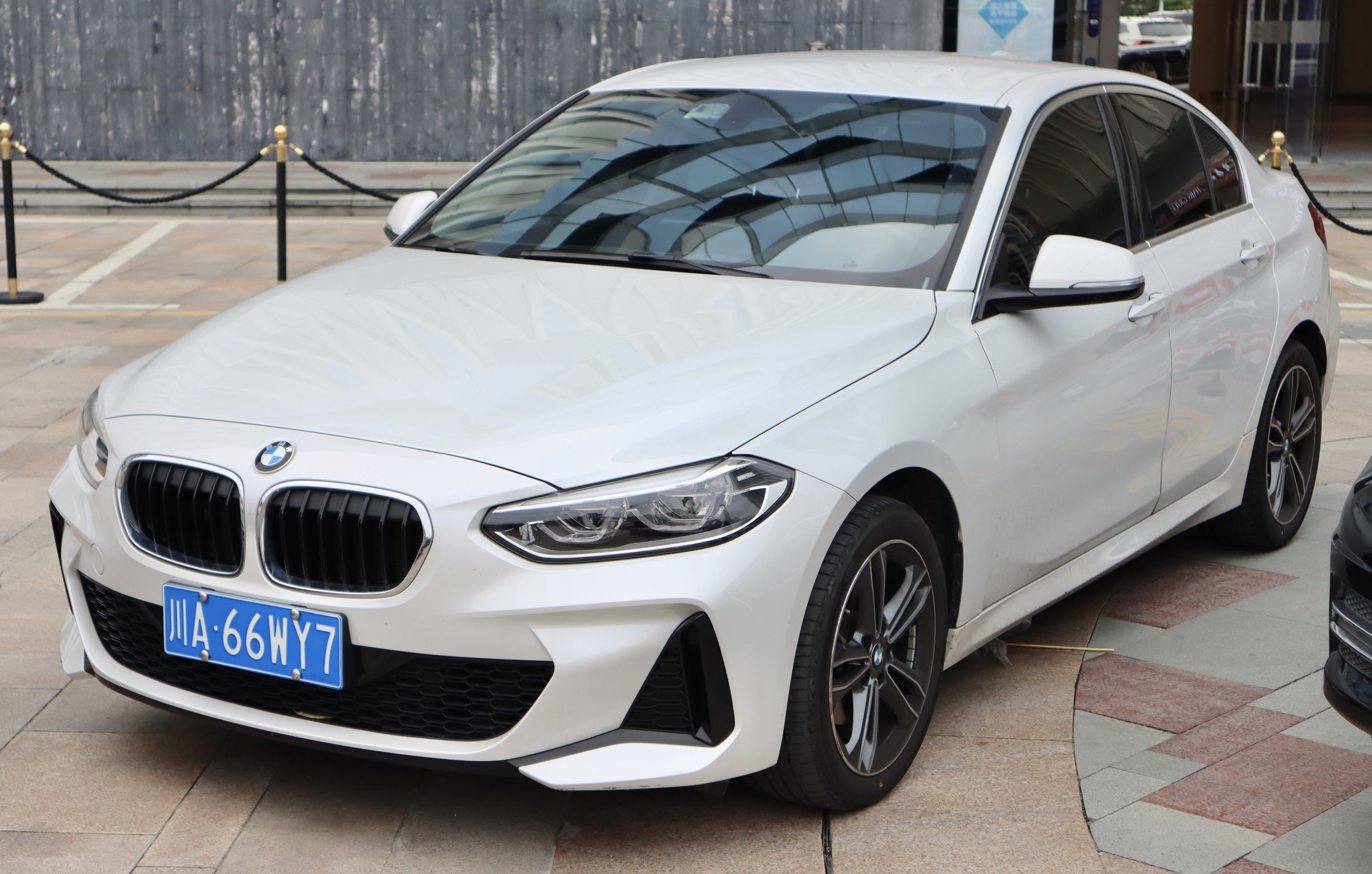
BMW 1 Series Sedan (F52)

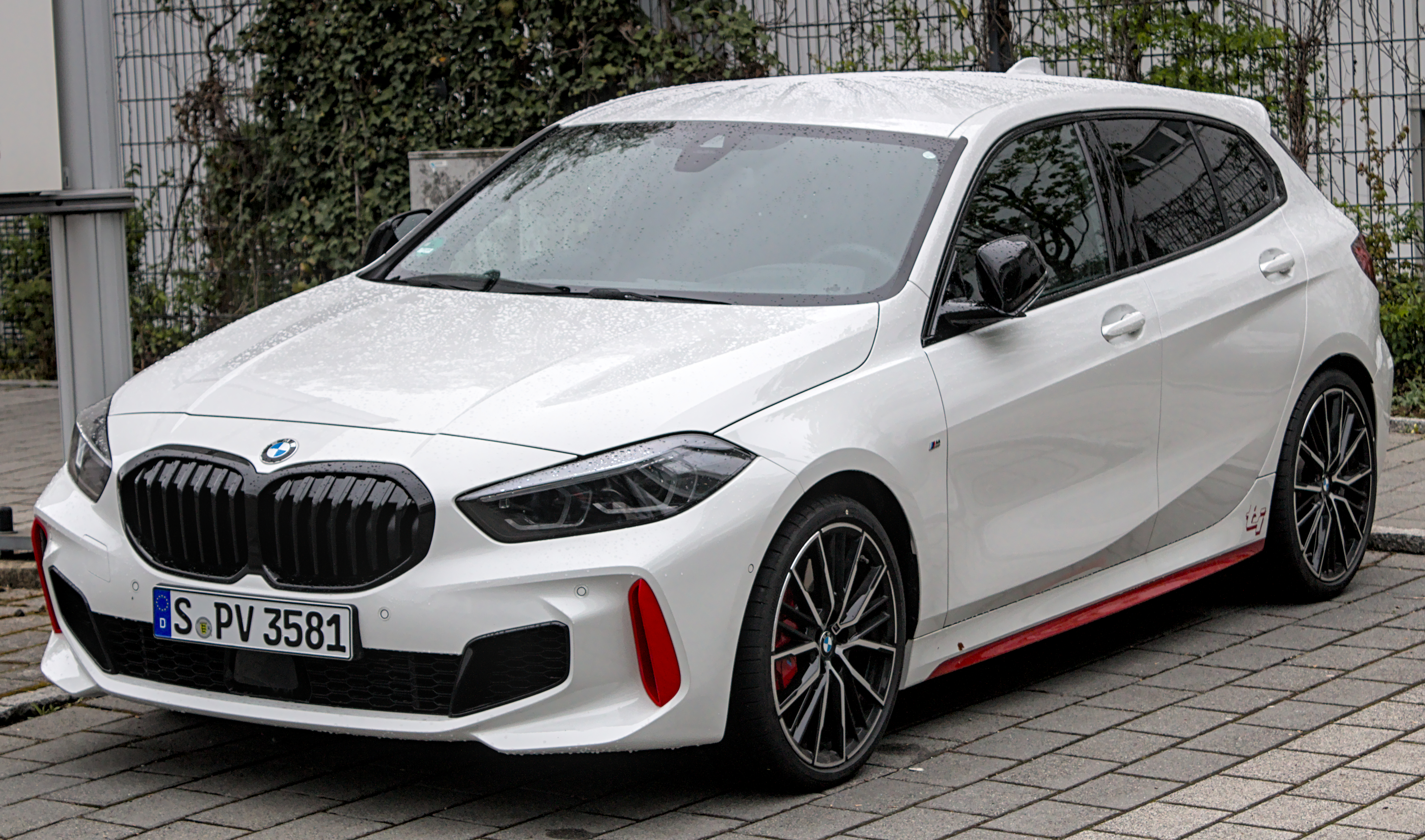
BMW 1 Series (F40)

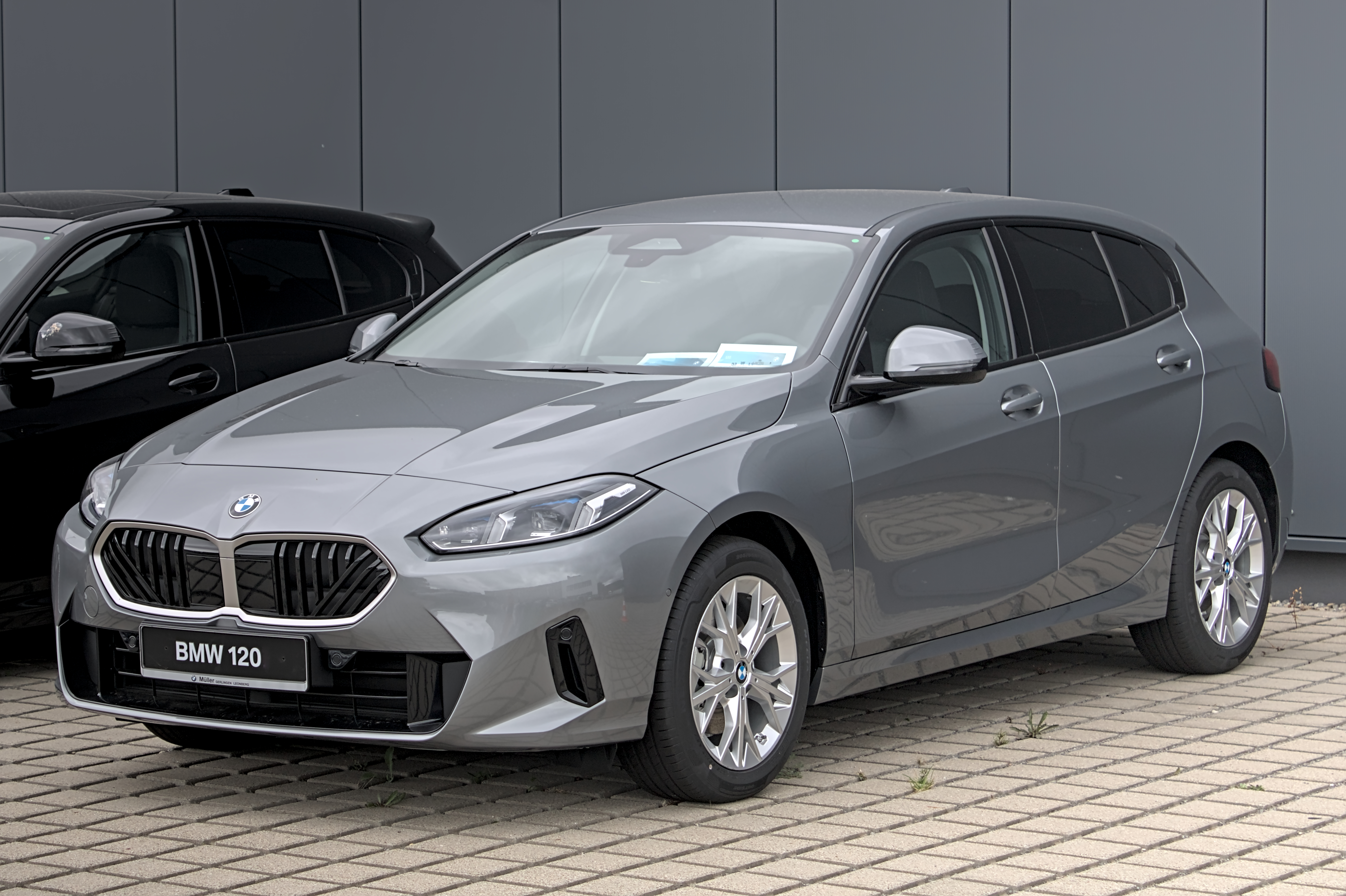
BMW 1 Series (F70)

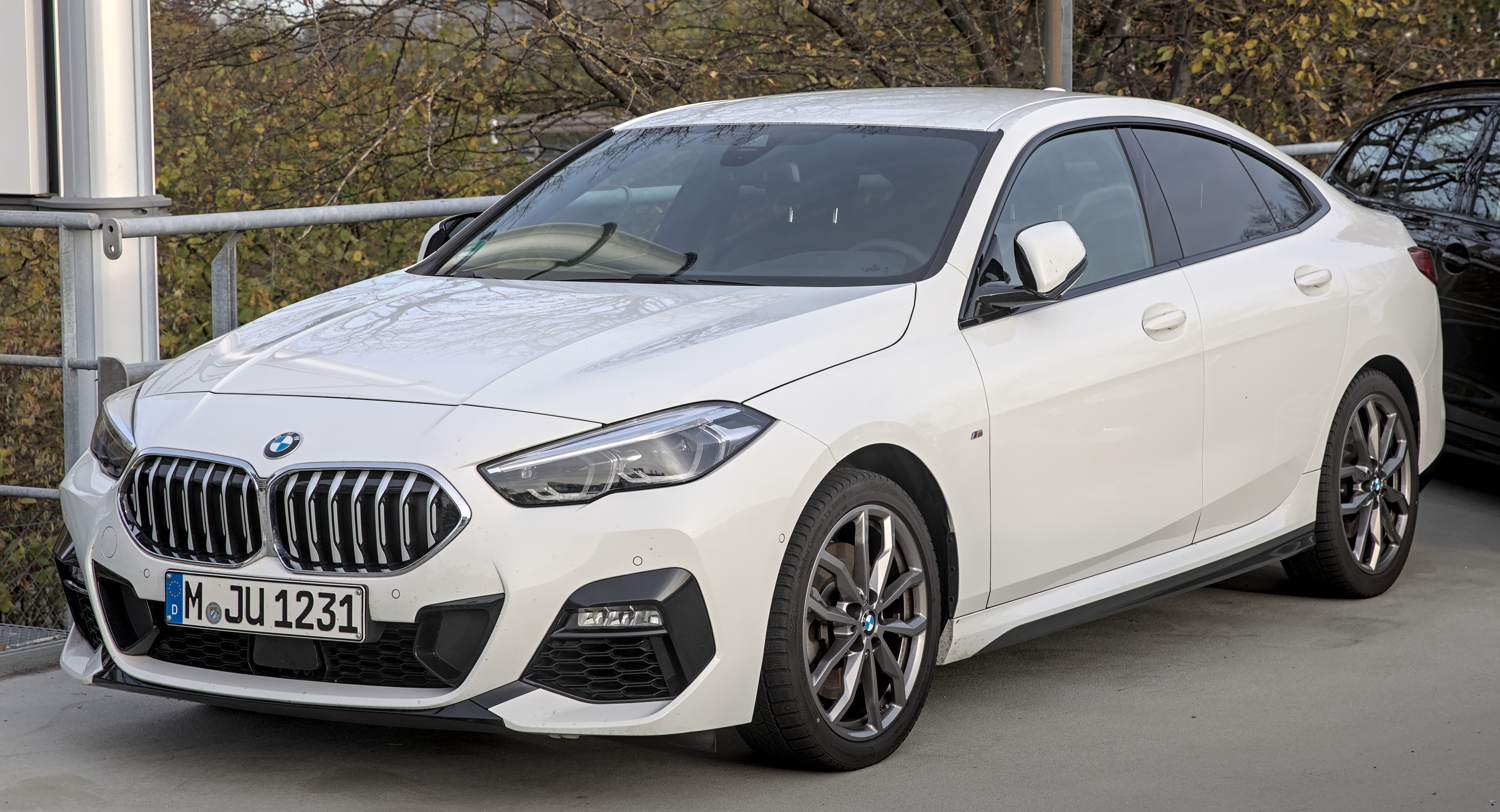
BMW 2 Series Gran Coupé (F44)

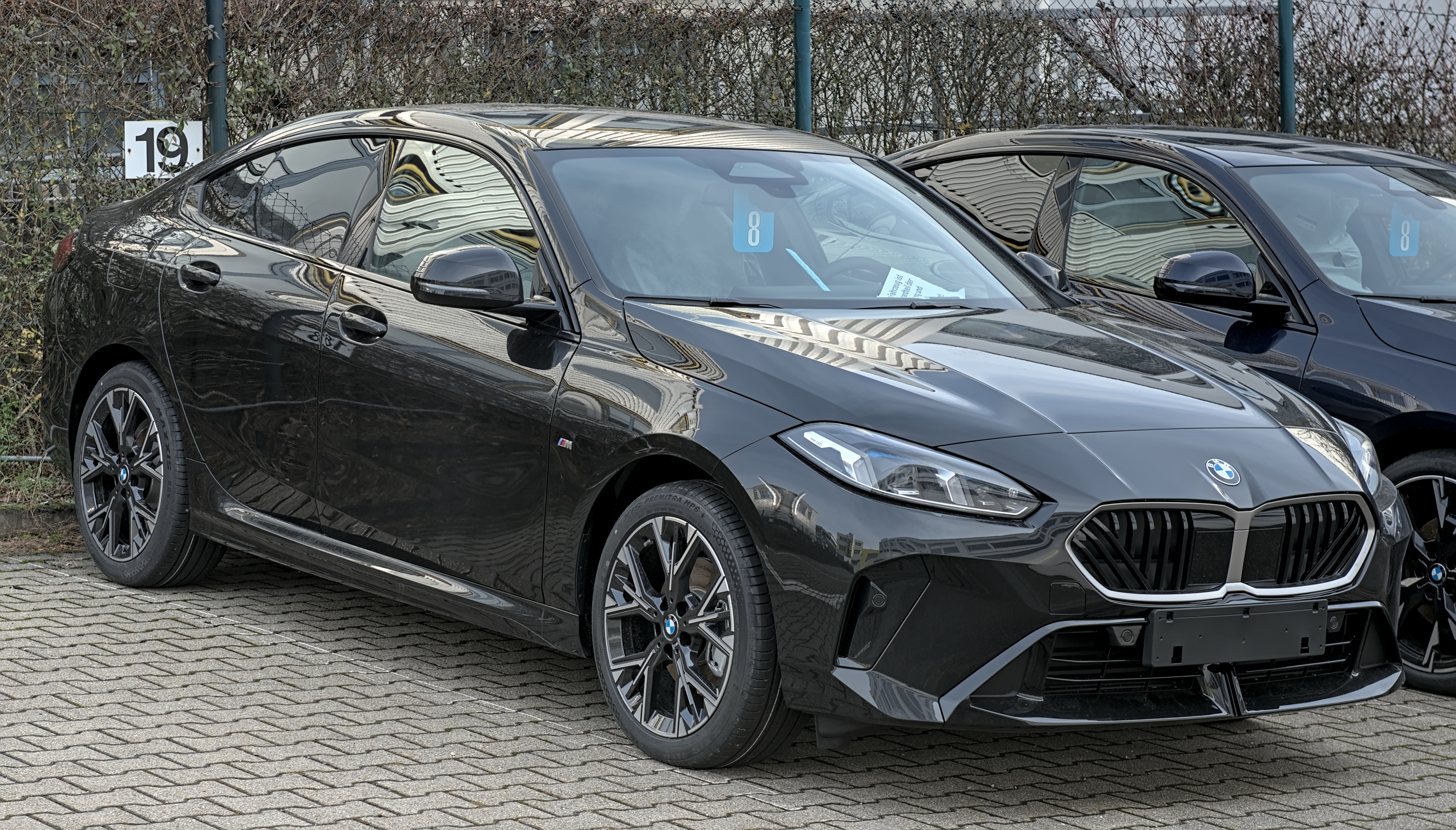
BMW 2 Series Gran Coupe (F74)

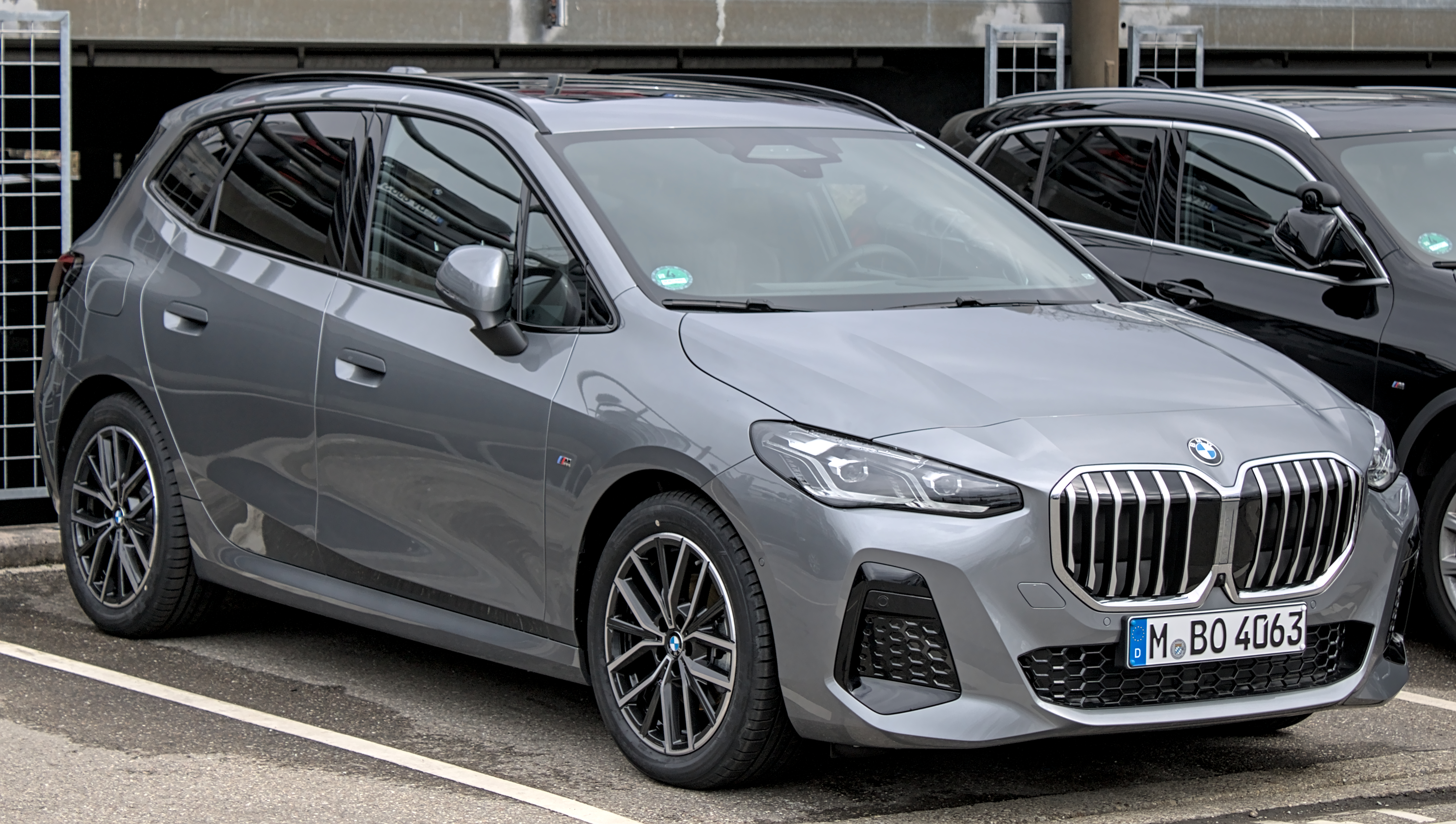
BMW 2 Series Active Tourer (U06)

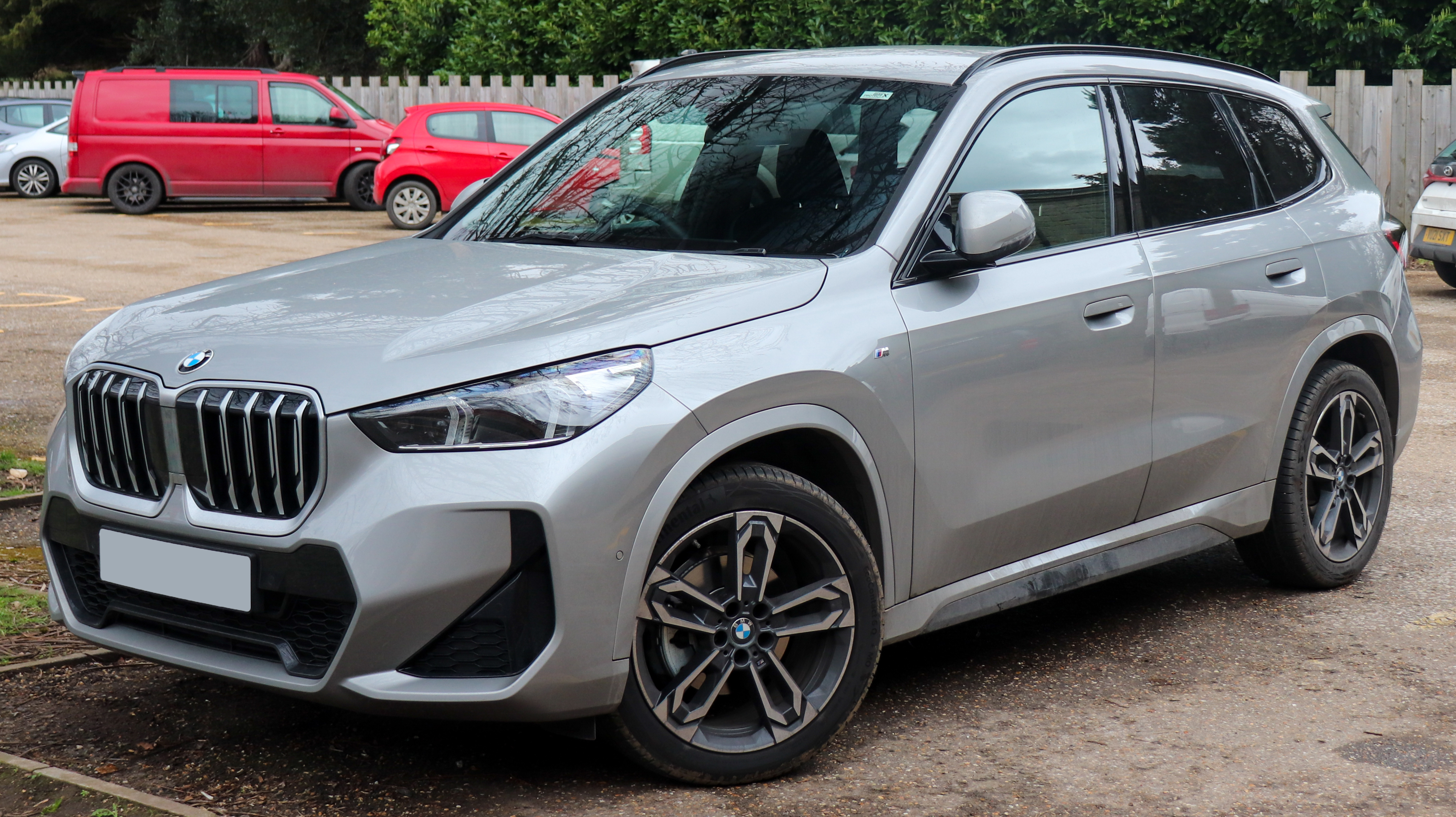
BMW X1 (U11)

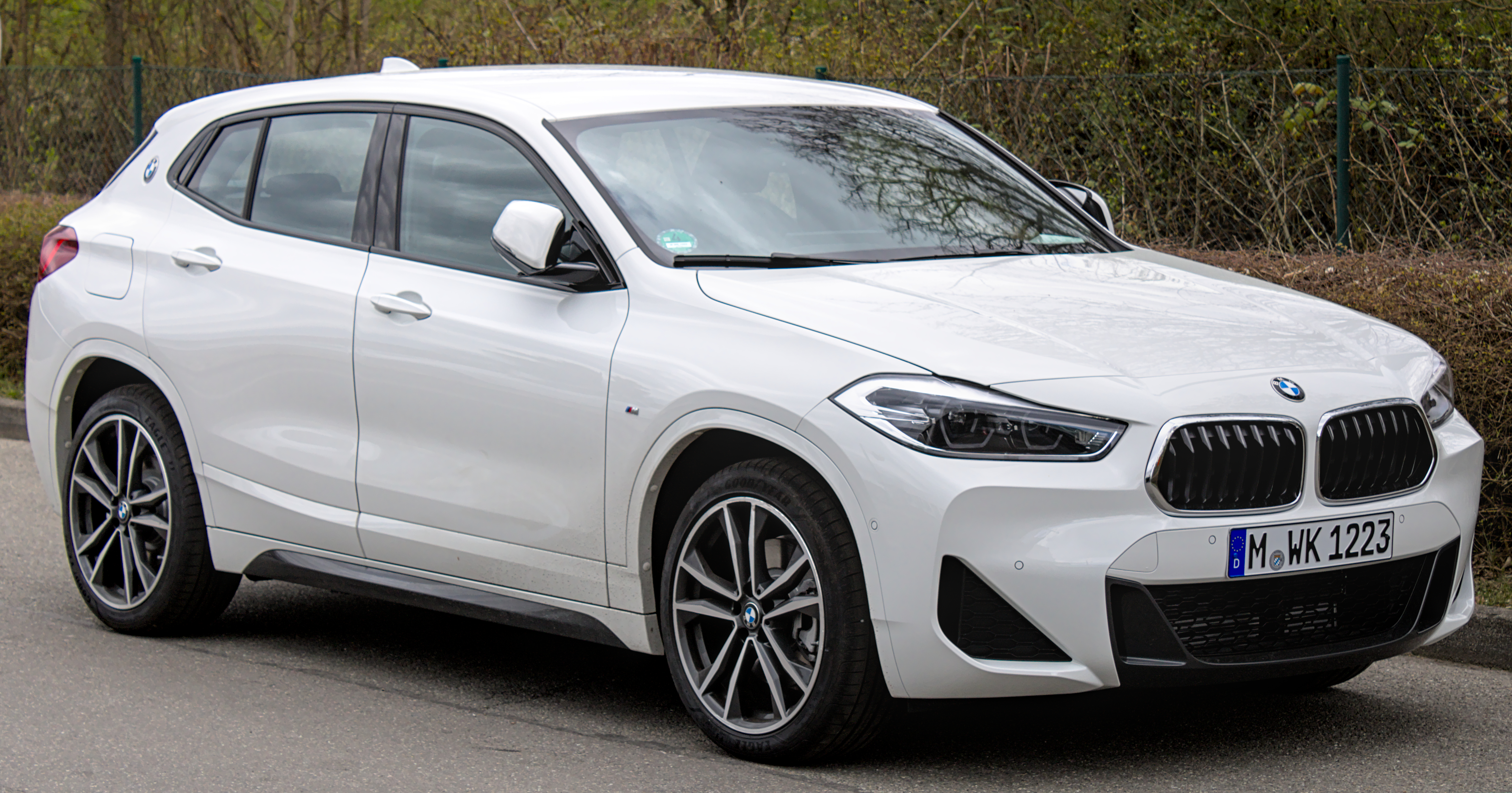
BMW X2 (F39)

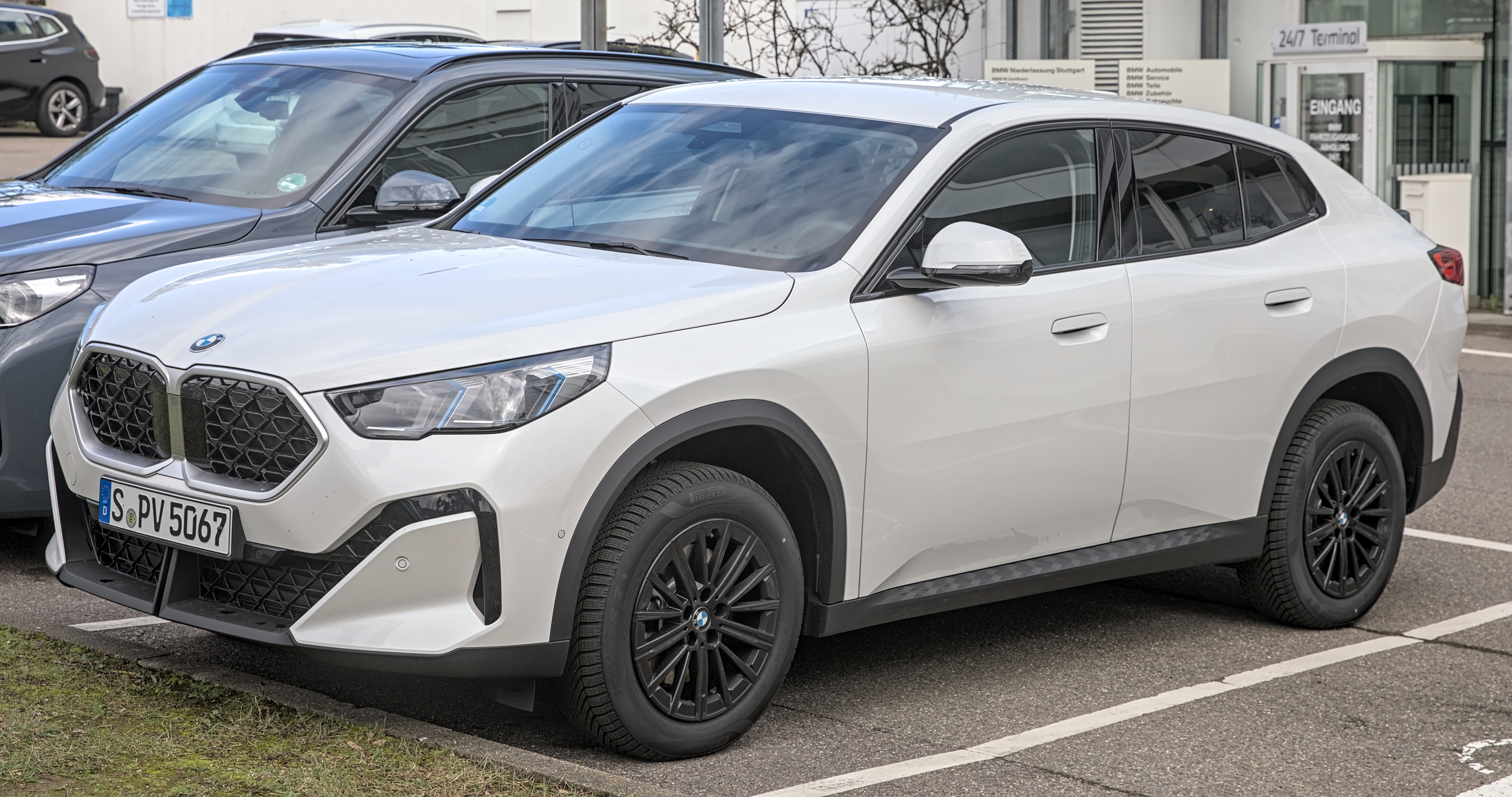
BMW X2 (U10)

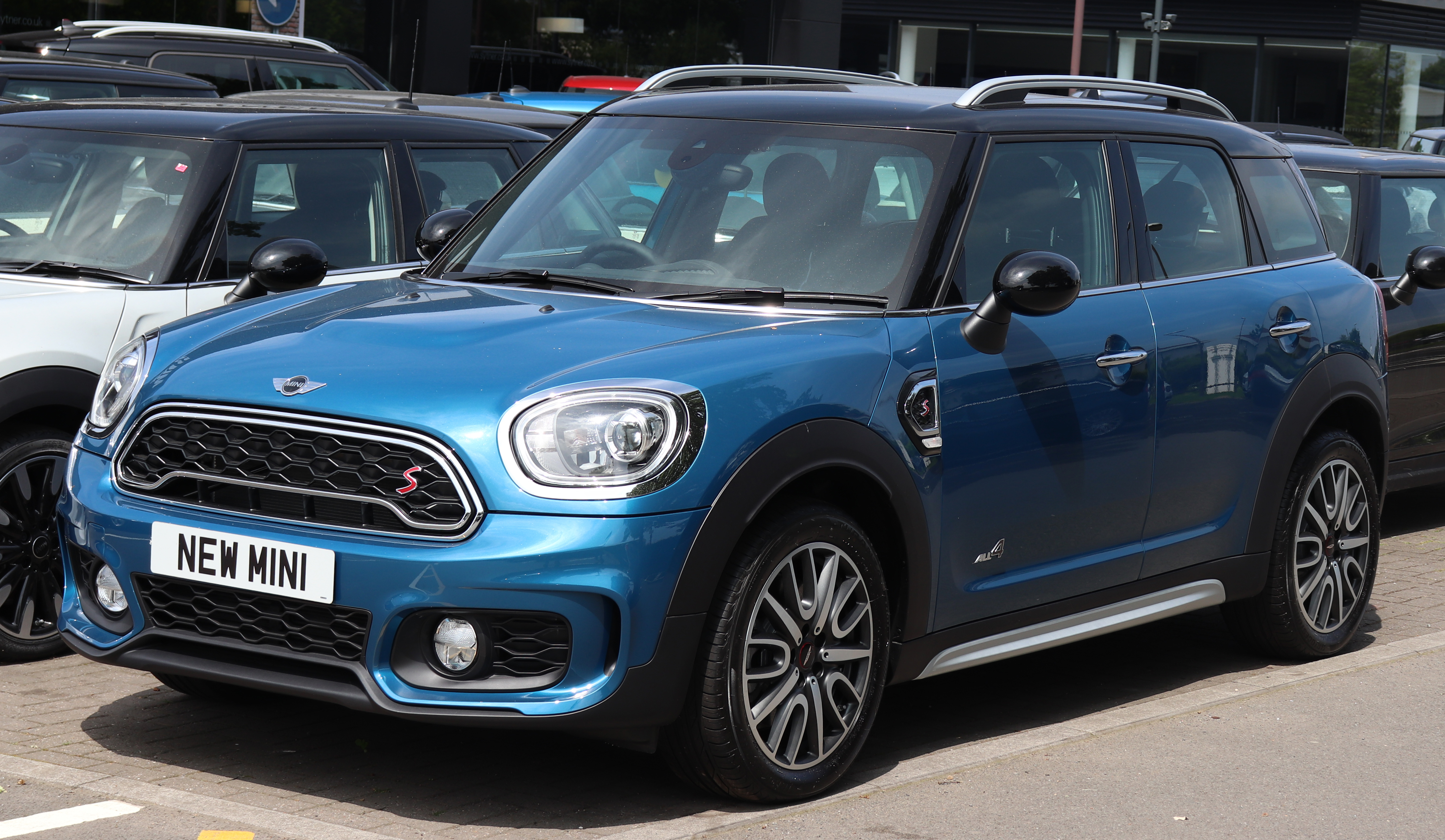
Mini Countryman (F60)

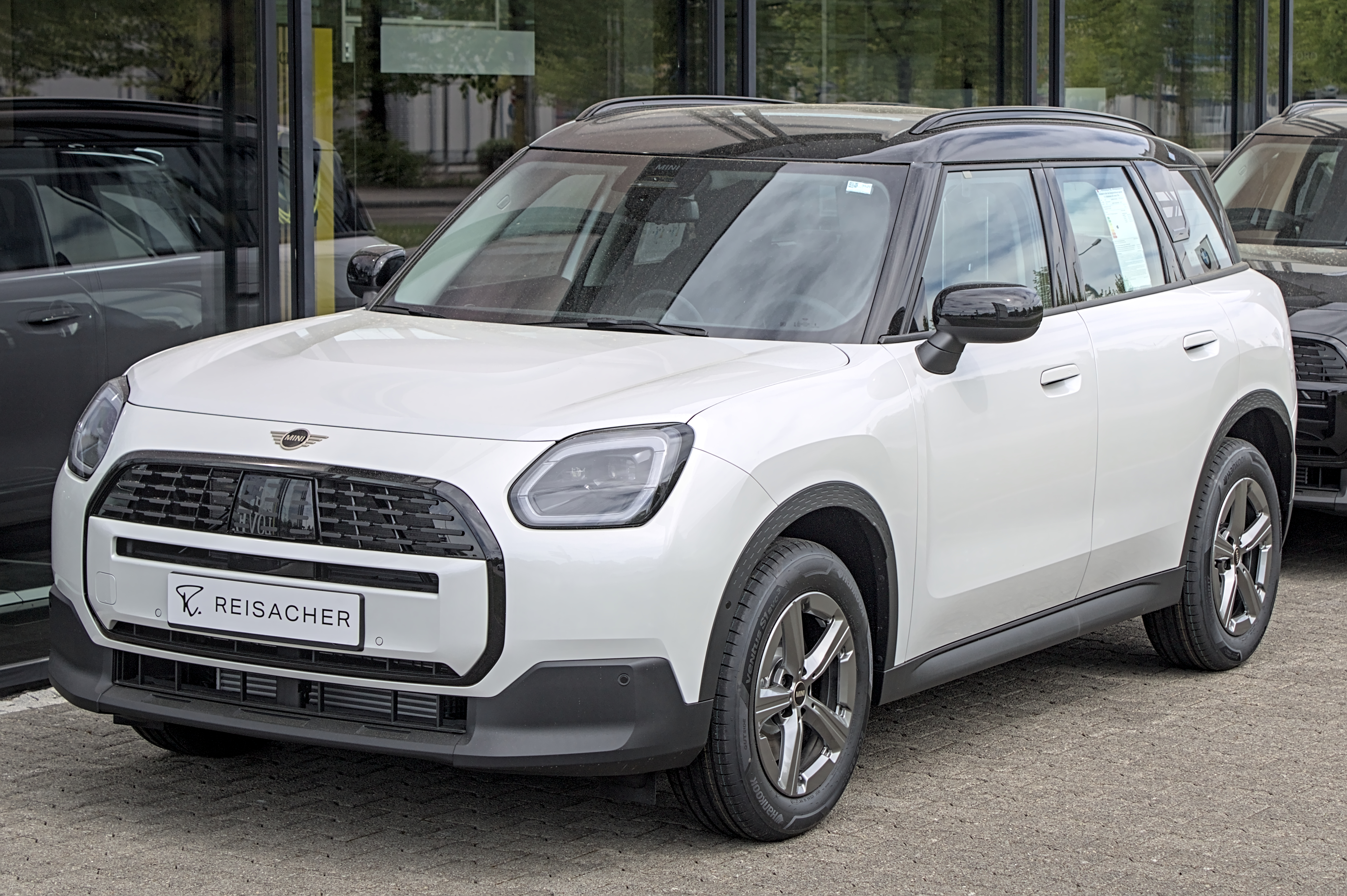
Mini Countryman (U25)

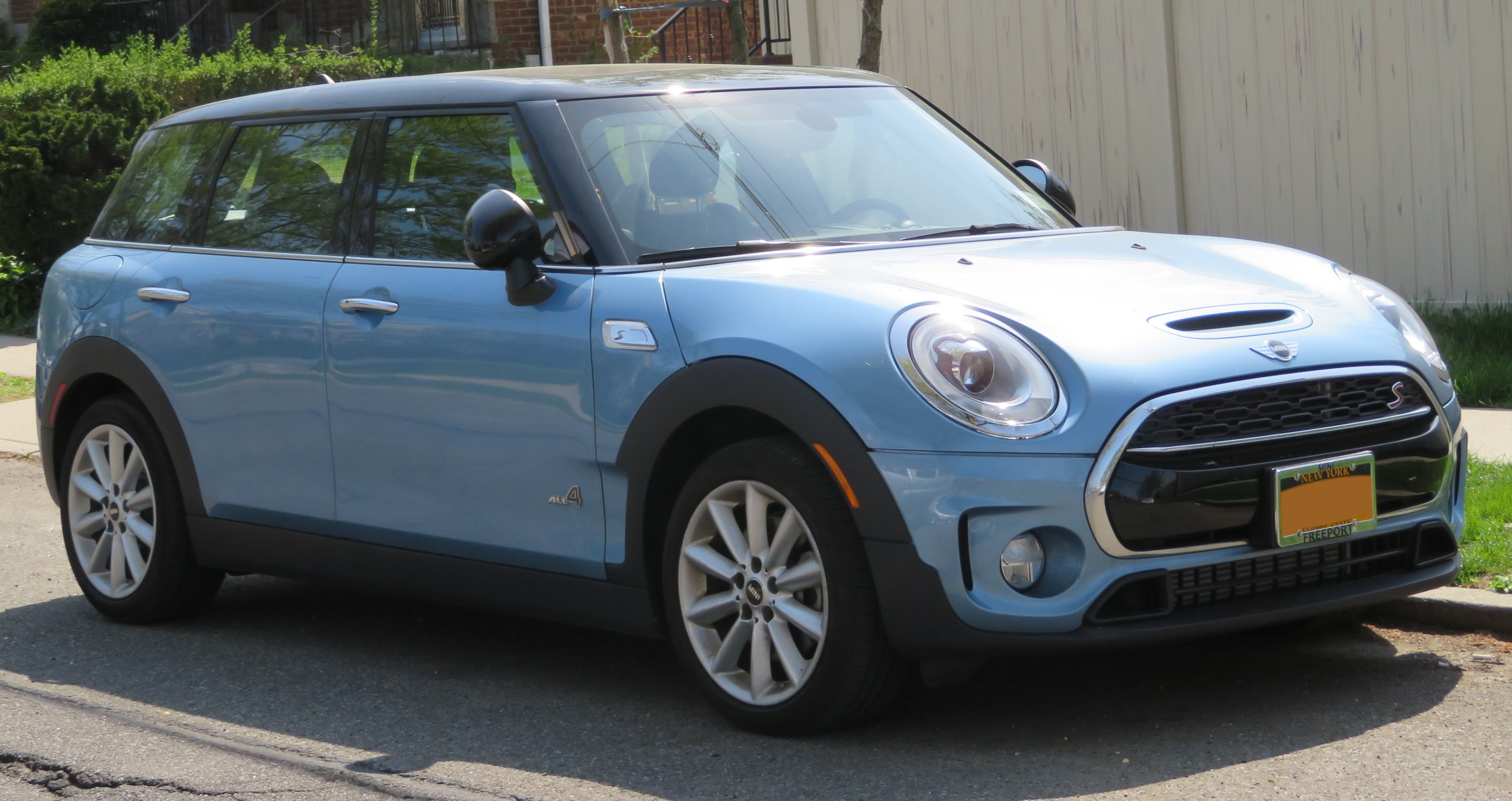
Mini Clubman (F54)

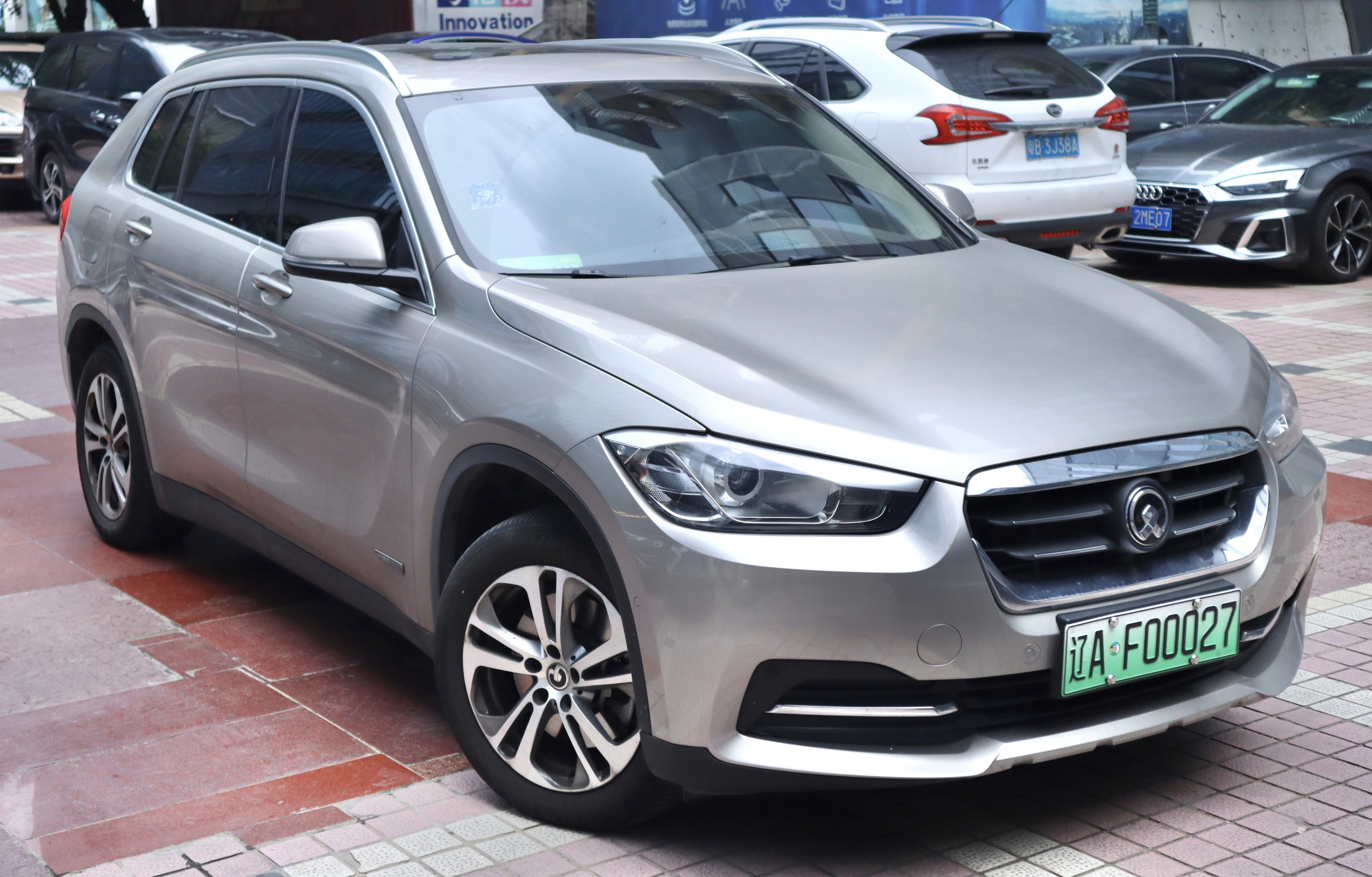
Zinoro 60H (F48)

== See also ==
- BMW CLAR platform
