= BMW 2 Series Gran Coupé =

Subcompact executive car produced by BMW

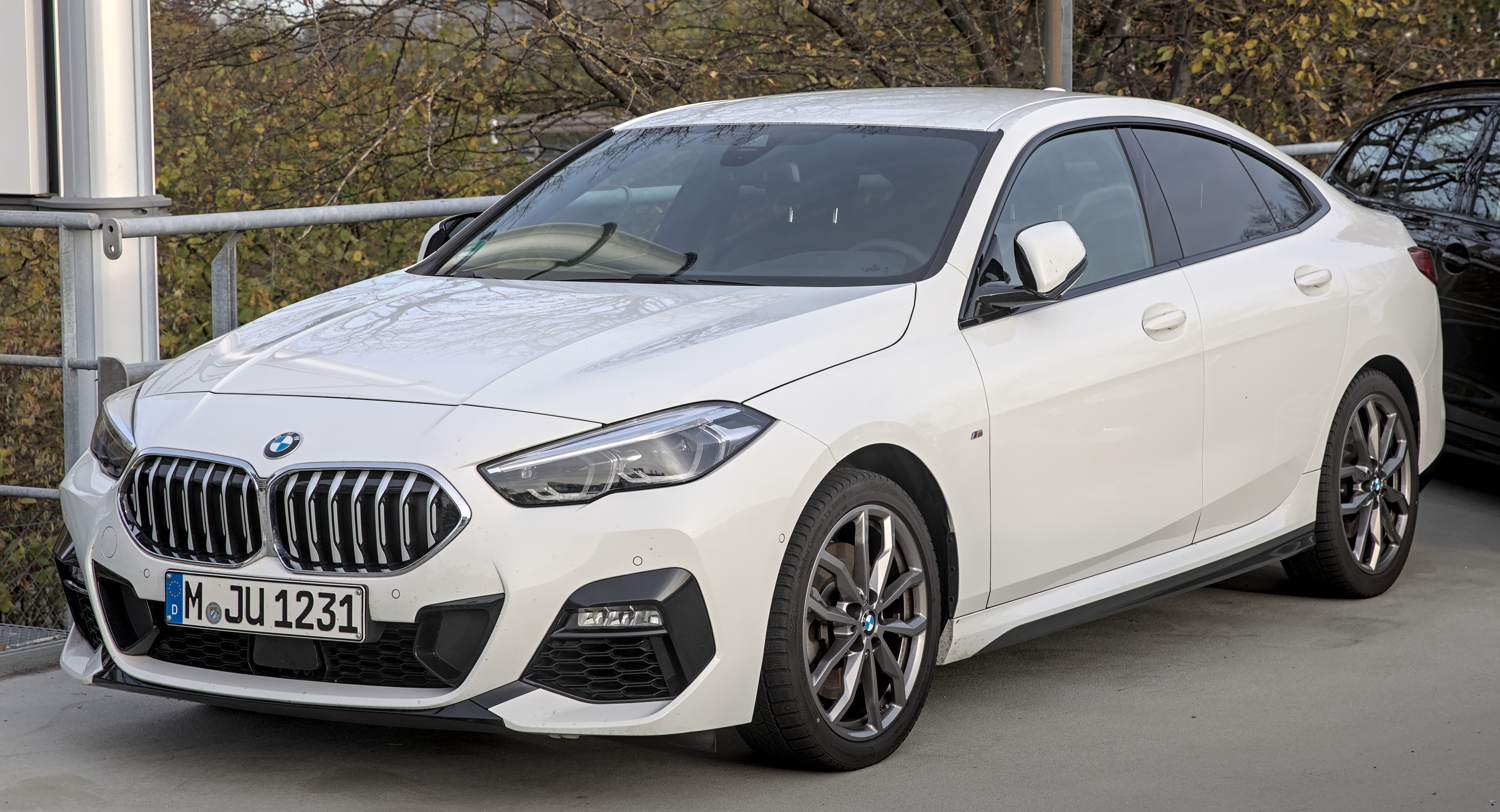

Overview
- Manufacturer: BMW
- Production: 2020–present

Body and chassis
- Class: Subcompact executive car (C)
- Body style: 4-door sedan
- Layout: Front-engine, front-wheel-drive; Front-engine, all-wheel-drive (xDrive)
- Platform: BMW UKL2 platform

The BMW 2 Series Gran Coupé is a subcompact executive sedan produced by BMW since 2020. For most markets, the 2 Series Gran Coupé is the smallest four-door sedan offered by BMW, except in China and Mexico where the F52 1 Series sedan was offered until it was discontinued in 2023.

== First generation (F44; 2020) ==
First generation
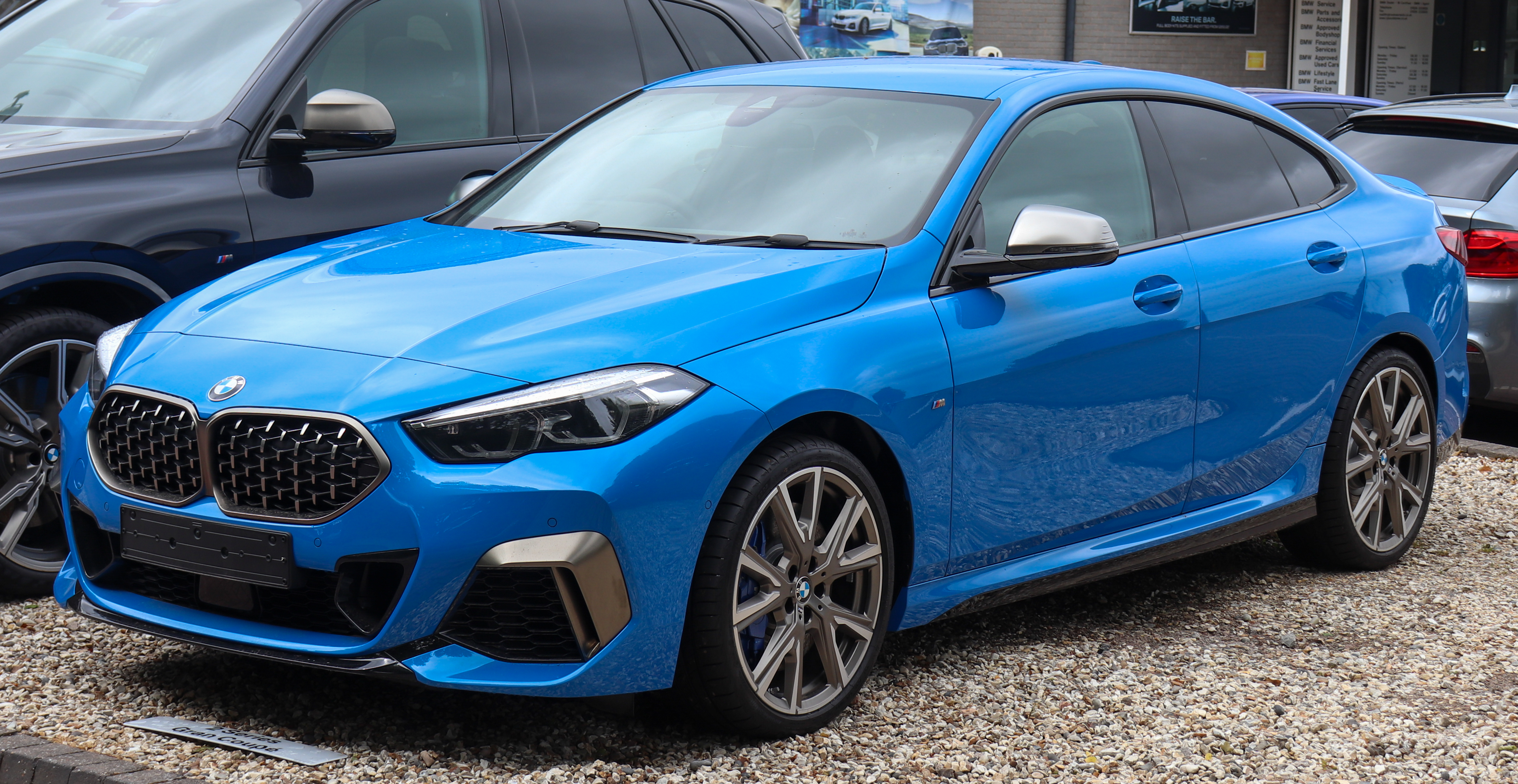
- 2020 BMW M235i xDrive Gran Coupé

Overview
- Model code: F44
- Production: March 2020 – 2024
- Model years: 2020–2024
- Assembly: Germany: Leipzig (BMW Leipzig Plant); Thailand: Rayong (BMW Thailand); Malaysia: Kulim, Kedah (Inokom); Indonesia: Jakarta (Gaya Motor)
- Designer: Nicolas Guille

Body and chassis
- Related: BMW 1 Series (F40)

Powertrain
- Engine: Petrol: 1.5 L B38 I3 turbo; 2.0 L B46/B48 I4 turbo; Diesel: 1.5 L B37 I3 turbo; 2.0 L B47 I4 turbo
- Transmission: 6-speed Getrag manual; 8-speed Aisin AWF8F35 automatic; 7-speed M-DCT dual-clutch

Dimensions
- Wheelbase: 2,670 mm (105.1 in)
- Length: 4,526 mm (178.2 in)
- Width: 1,800 mm (70.9 in)
- Height: 1,420 mm (55.9 in)
- Kerb weight: 1,350–1,570 kg (2,976–3,461 lb)

The first generation of the 2 Series Gran Coupé was revealed on 16 October 2019, and officially premiered at the 2019 Los Angeles Auto Show in November, and was launched in worldwide markets in March 2020.

The 2 Series uses the front-wheel drive-based UKL2 architecture and uses a multi-link rear suspension system. As the result, despite its similar name, it is mechanically unrelated to the F22 2 Series coupé and convertible. Compared to the F22 2 Series, the F44 has 33 mm (1.3 in) more knee room, 14 mm (0.6 in) more headroom, and a 40 litres (1.4 cu ft) larger boot capacity at 430 litres (15 cu ft). It shares the same front hood, fender panel, dashboard and suspension as the F40 1 Series.

All petrol and diesel engines are installed with particulate filters and meet the Euro 6d-TEMP emissions standard. Diesel engines also have AdBlue selective catalytic reduction.

218i models are available with a 6-speed manual transmission or a 7-speed dual-clutch transmission. 228i xDrive, M235i xDrive, and 220d models are only available with an 8-speed automatic transmission. 220i models are only available with a 7-speed dual-clutch transmission.

The M235i xDrive Gran Coupé has been described by some automotive commentators and owners as an underrated performance model, with its handling, all-wheel-drive traction and everyday practicality cited as strengths relative to its price and its more heavily promoted rivals.

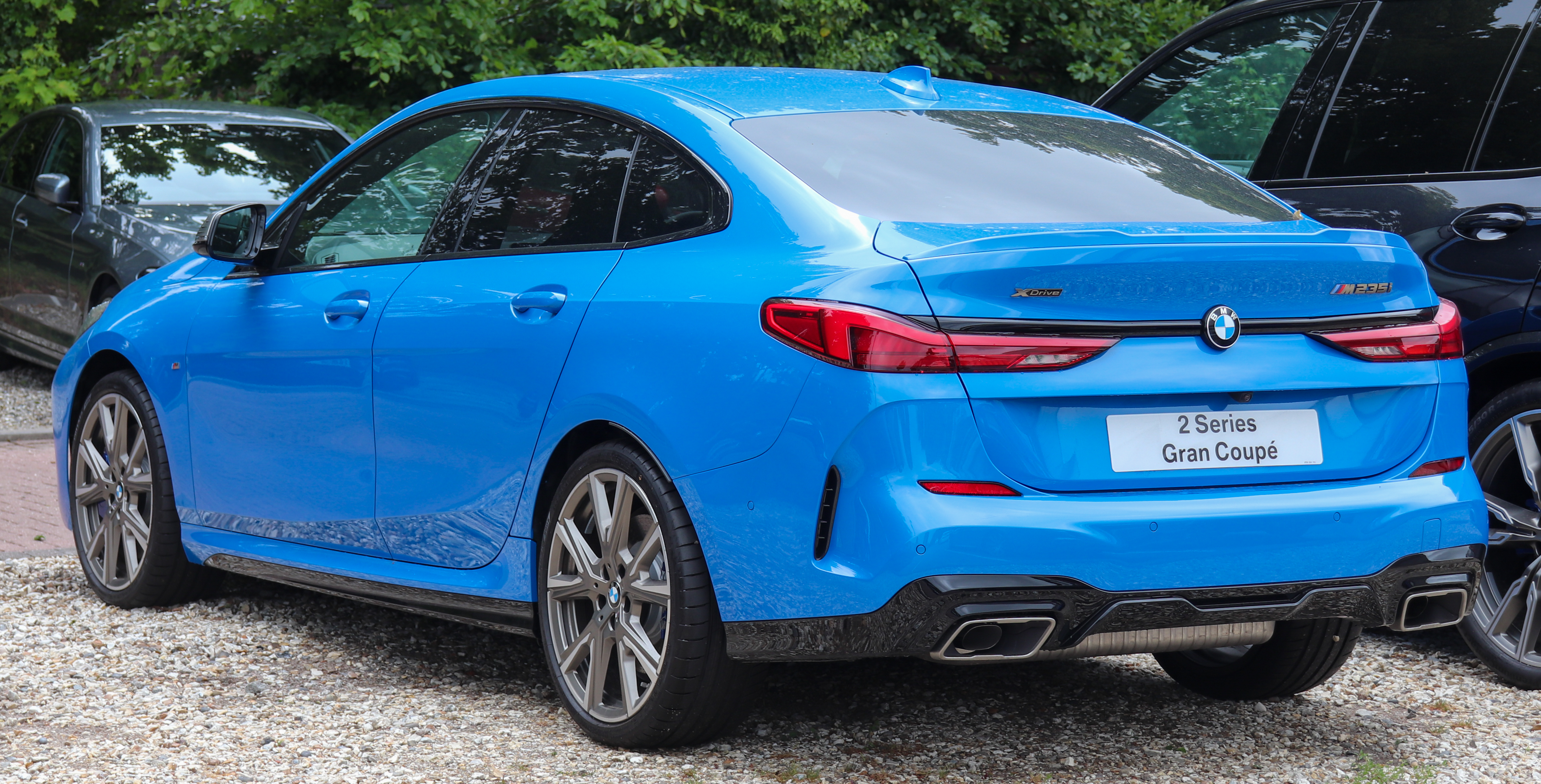
2020 BMW M235i xDrive Gran Coupé

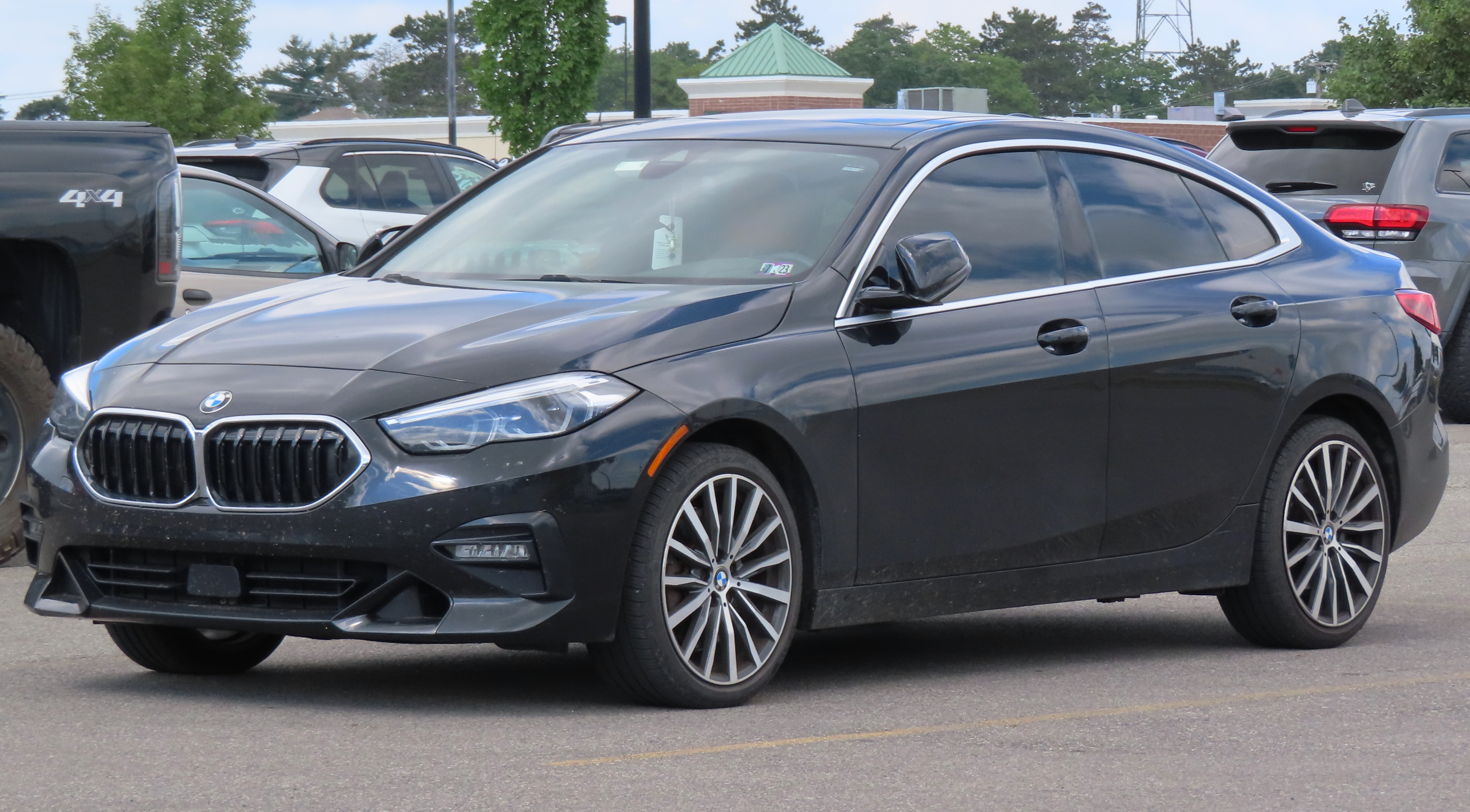
Standard model

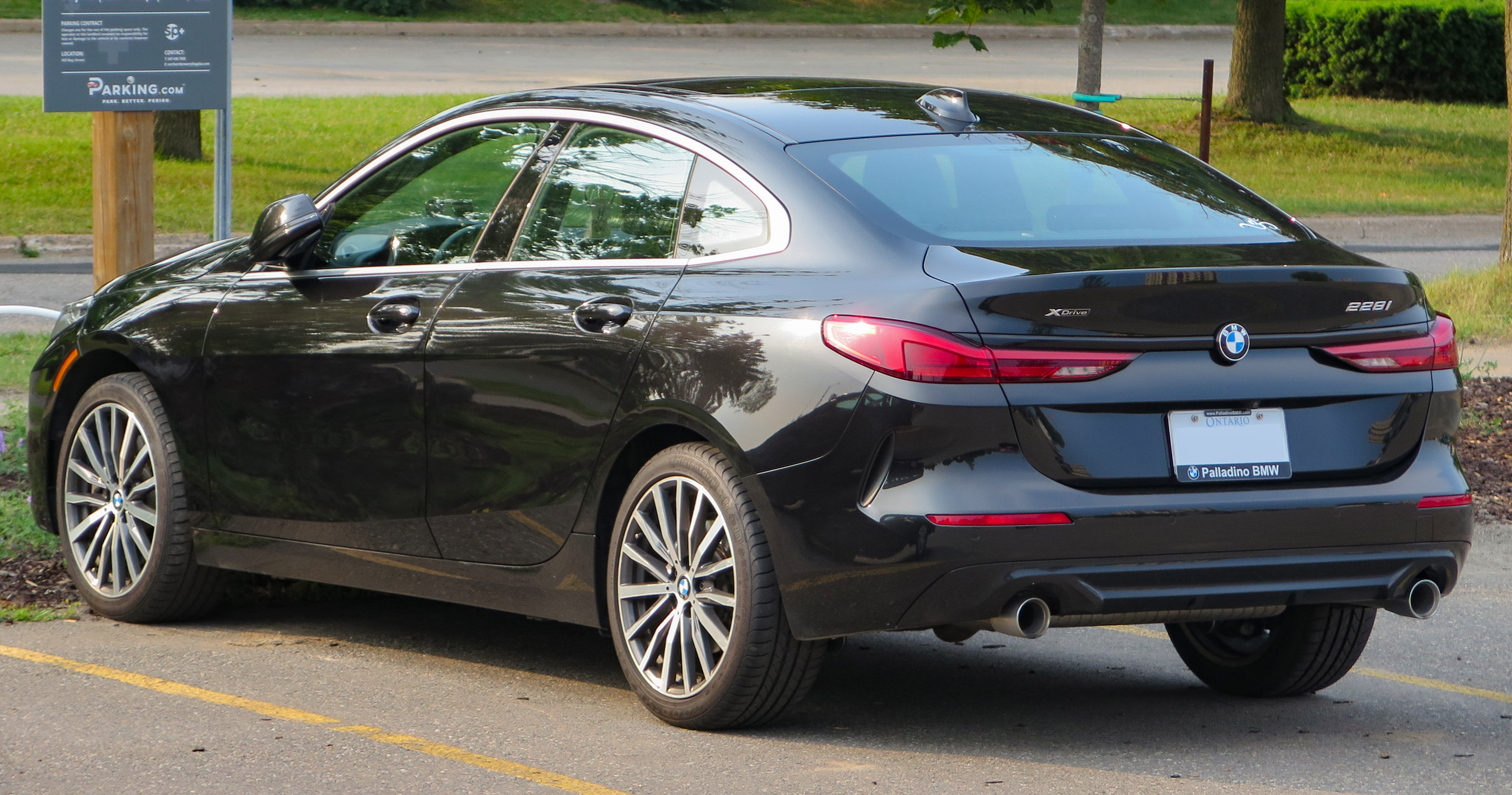
Standard model

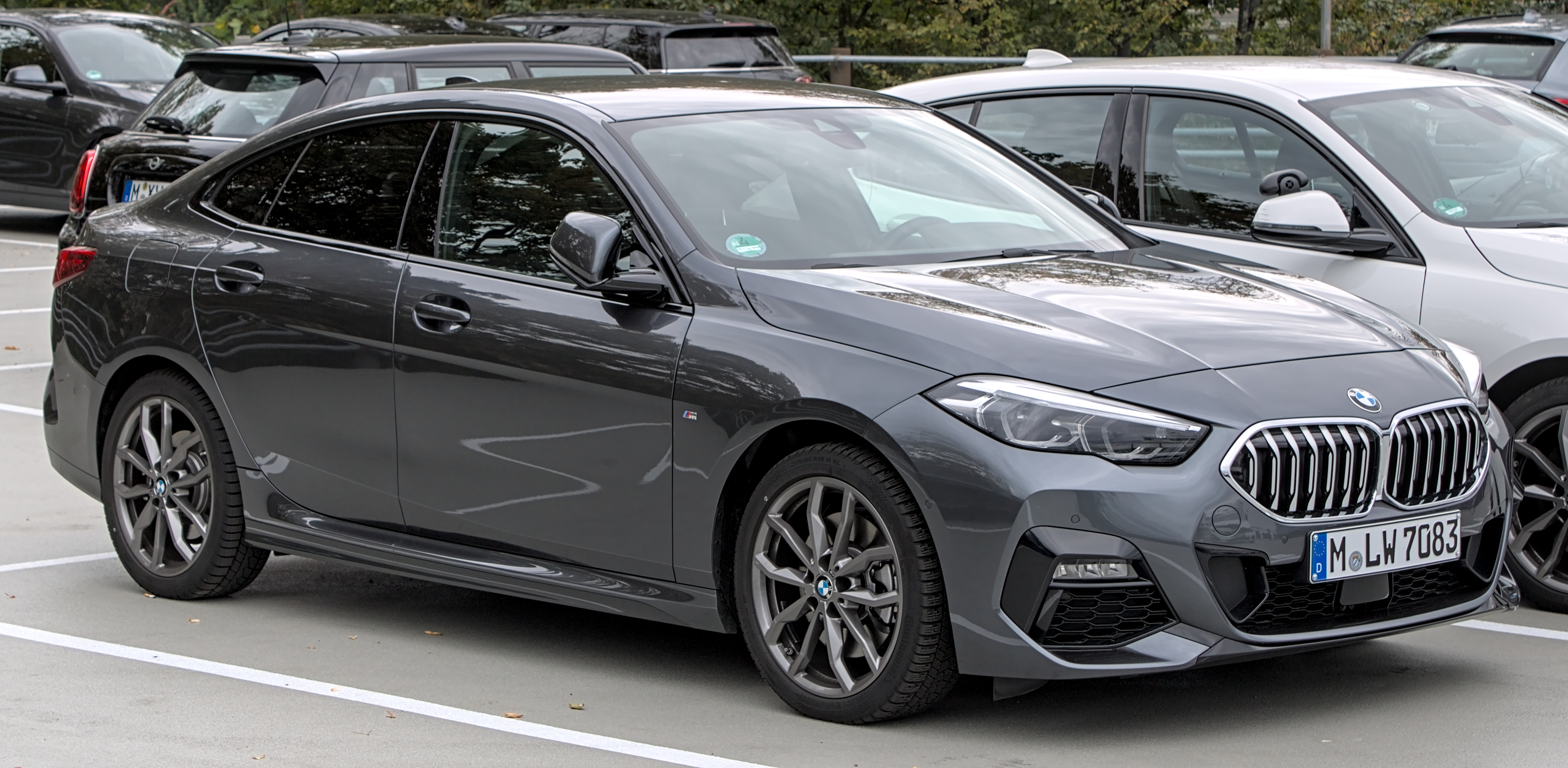
M Sport package

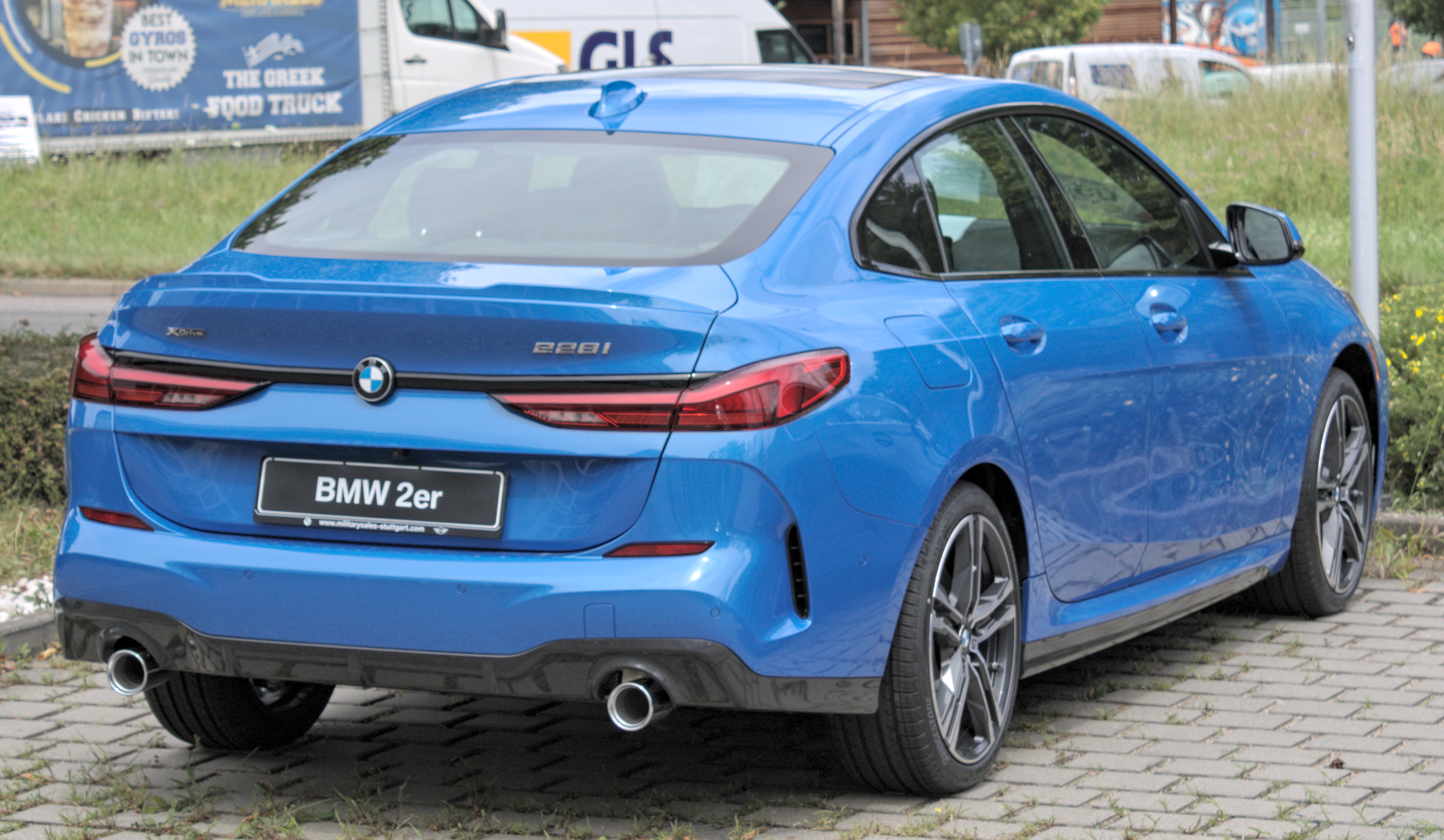
M Sport package

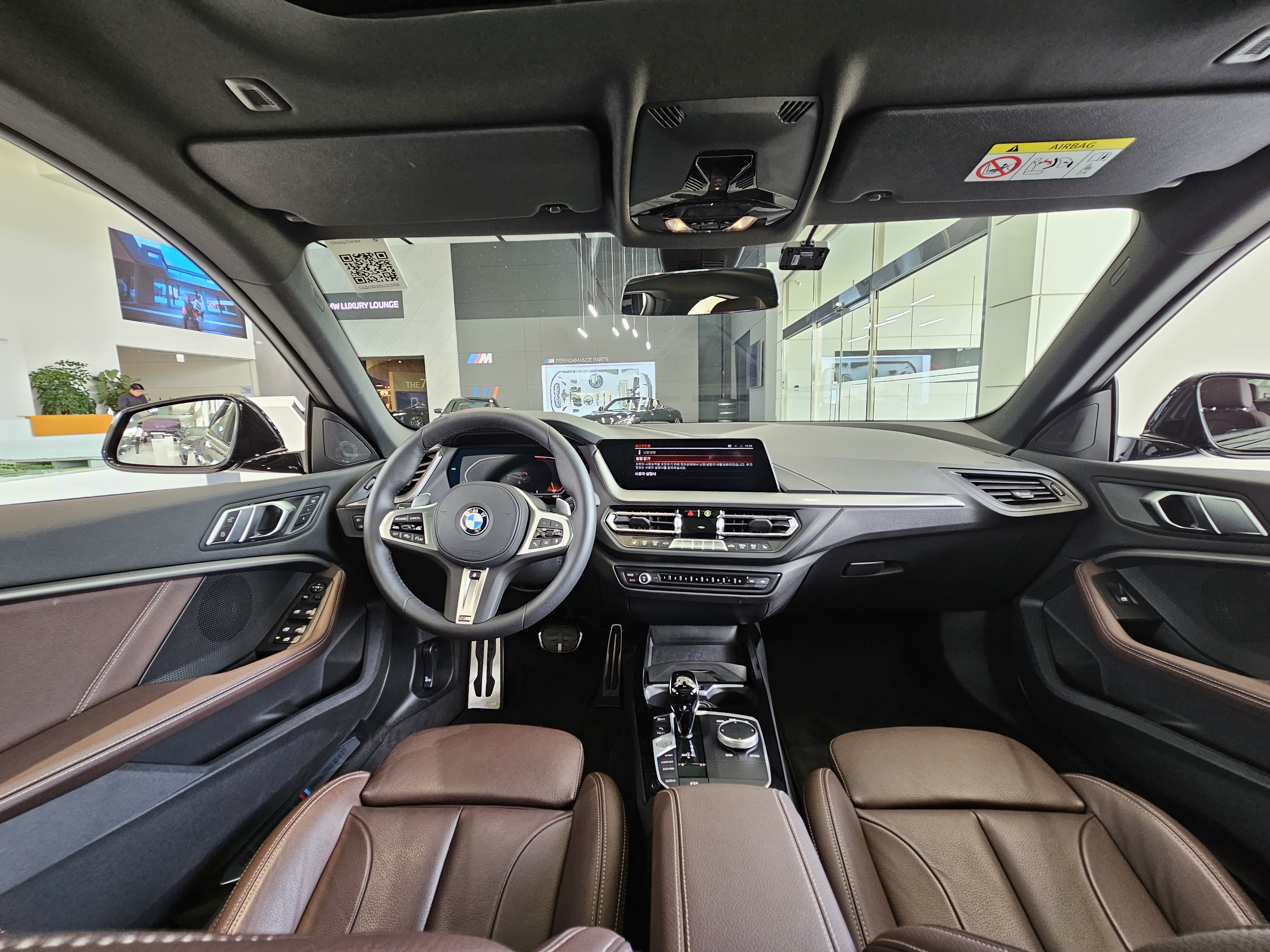
Interior

=== Equipment ===
Standard equipment includes full LED lights and 40:20:40 split folding rear seats. Collision detection with braking intervention is also standard in European models. In addition to the basic model, the 2 Series is available in the Luxury and Sport line which adds 17-inch wheels and a sports steering wheel, and the M Sport line which adds 18-inch wheels, an M Sport steering wheel, and M Sport exterior styling.

Optional equipment includes ambient lighting, a panoramic sunroof, a 9.2-inch windshield reflected head up display, and Apple CarPlay. The F44 2 Series can be unlocked via near-field communication by holding a smartphone near the door handle, and can start the engine by placing the smartphone in the wireless charging tray. The digital key can also be shared with up to 5 other smartphones.

The 2 Series is also available with iDrive 7 which features over-the-air software updates and a digital assistant that can be activated by saying "Hello BMW". The digital assistant learns the habits of the user over time and can control in-car functions, check the maintenance status, or answer questions about the vehicle's functions.

The 2 Series uses the navigation system and camera data to prevent unnecessary gear changes when travelling through corners and to determine appropriate shutdowns for the engine start-stop system.

216-228 models with the M Sport Trim and M235 models can be fitted with M Performance Parts. These include sport brakes, carbon fibre mirrors and M rims.

=== Models ===
==== Petrol engines ====
Model	Years	Engine	Power	Torque	0–100 km/h (0–62 mph)
216i	2022–	B38A15 1.5 L I3 turbo	81 kW (109 hp) at 4,600–6,500 rpm	190 N⋅m (140 lb⋅ft) at 1,380–3,800 rpm	10.8 s
218i	2019–	B38A15 1.5 L I3 turbo	103 kW (138 hp) at 4,500–6,500 rpm	220 N⋅m (162 lb⋅ft) at 1,500–4,100 rpm	9.1 s
220i	2020–	B48A20 2.0 L I4 turbo	131 kW (176 hp) at 5,000–5,500 rpm	280 N⋅m (207 lb⋅ft) at 1,350–4,200 rpm	7.1 s
220i xDrive	2021–	B48A20 2.0 L I4 turbo	131 kW (176 hp) at 5,000–5,500 rpm	280 N⋅m (207 lb⋅ft) at 1,350–4,200 rpm	7.1 s
228i*	2019–	B48A20 2.0 L I4 turbo	170 kW (228 hp) at 5,000–6,500 rpm	350 N⋅m (258 lb⋅ft) at 1,250–4,800 rpm	6.3 s
228i xDrive*	2019–	B48A20 2.0 L I4 turbo	170 kW (228 hp) at 5,000–6,500 rpm	350 N⋅m (258 lb⋅ft) at 1,250–4,800 rpm	6.0 s
M235i xDrive	2019–	B48A20 2.0 L I4 turbo	225 kW (302 hp) at 5,000–6,250 rpm	450 N⋅m (332 lb⋅ft) at 1,800–4,500 rpm	4.9 s

*Canada and U.S. only.

==== Diesel engines ====
Model	Years	Engine	Power	Torque	0–100 km/h (0–62 mph)
216d	2020–	B37C15 1.5 L I3 turbo	85 kW (114 hp) at 4,000 rpm	270 N⋅m (199 lb⋅ft) at 1,750–2,250 rpm	10.3 s
218d	2020–	B47D20 2.0 L I4 turbo	110 kW (148 hp) at 4,000 rpm	350 N⋅m (258 lb⋅ft) at 1,750–2,500 rpm	8.5 s
220d	2020–	B47D20 2.0 L I4 turbo	140 kW (188 hp) at 4,000 rpm	400 N⋅m (295 lb⋅ft) at 1,750–2,500 rpm	7.5 s
220d xDrive	2020–	B47D20 2.0 L I4 turbo	140 kW (188 hp) at 4,000 rpm	400 N⋅m (295 lb⋅ft) at 1,750–2,500 rpm	7.3 s

=== Safety ===
==== ANCAP ====
ANCAP test results BMW 2 Series Gran Coupé (2019, aligned with Euro NCAP)
Test	Points	%
Overall:	5 /5 stars	
Adult occupant:	35.7	94%
Child occupant:	43.8	89%
Pedestrian:	36.5	76%
Safety assist:	9.6	73%

==== Euro NCAP ====
Euro NCAP test results BMW 118i (LHD) (2019)
Test	Points	%
Overall:	5 /5 stars	
Adult occupant:	35.9	94%
Child occupant:	43.0	87%
Pedestrian:	36.5	76%
Safety assist:	9.5	72%

== Second generation (F74/F78; 2025) ==
Second generation
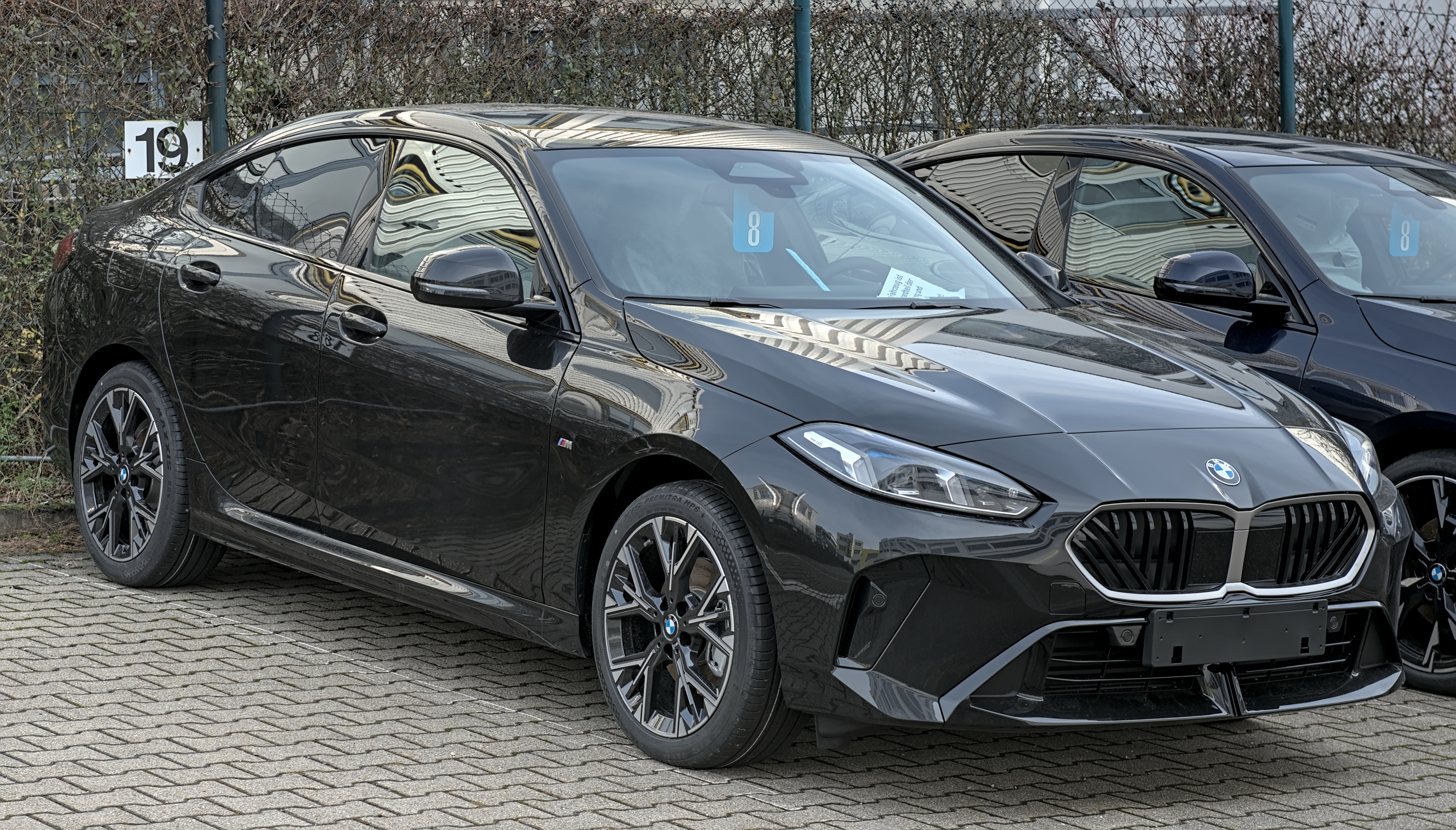
- BMW 220d (F74)

Overview
- Model code: F74; F78 (long-wheelbase, China)
- Production: November 2024 – present
- Assembly: Germany: Leipzig (BMW Leipzig Plant); China: Tiexi, Shenyang (BBA, F78 only); Malaysia: Kulim, Kedah (Inokom); Indonesia: Jakarta (Gaya Motor)
- Designer: José Casas

Body and chassis
- Related: BMW 1 Series (F70)

Powertrain
- Engine: Petrol: 1.5 L B38 I3 turbo; 2.0 L B46/B48 I4 turbo; Diesel: 1.5 L B37 I3 turbo; 2.0 L B47 I4 turbo
- Transmission: 7-speed M-DCT dual-clutch

Dimensions
- Wheelbase: 2,670 mm (105.1 in); 2,780 mm (109.4 in) (LWB, China)
- Length: 4,546 mm (179.0 in); 4,663 mm (183.6 in) (LWB, China)
- Width: 1,800 mm (70.9 in)
- Height: 1,445 mm (56.9 in)
- Kerb weight: 1,495–1,650 kg (3,296–3,638 lb)

Chronology
- Predecessor: BMW 1 Series (F52) (China)

The second generation of the 2 Series Gran Coupé was officially revealed on 15 October 2024. Production at the BMW Leipzig Plant commenced in November 2024.

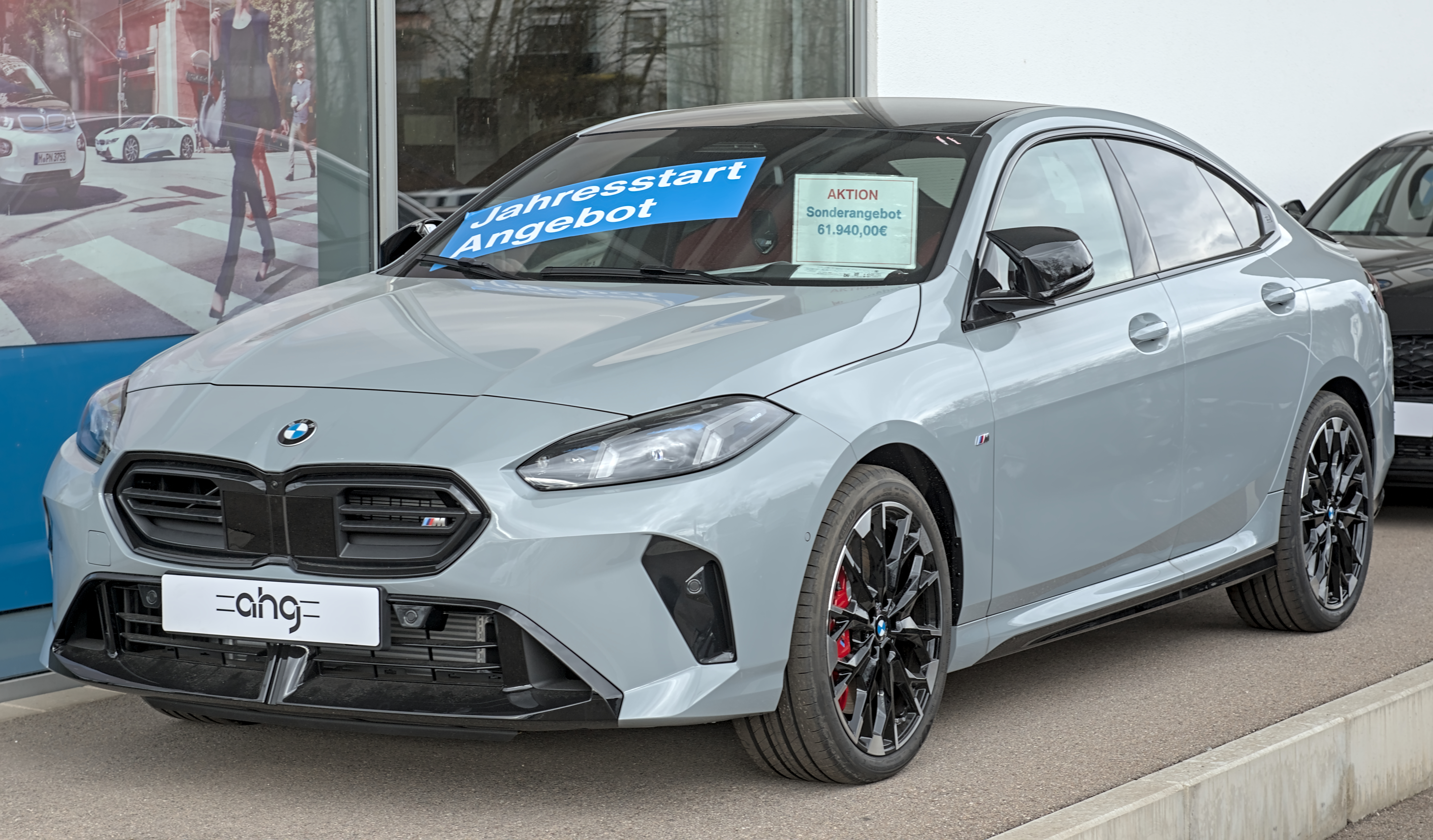
BMW M235 (F74)

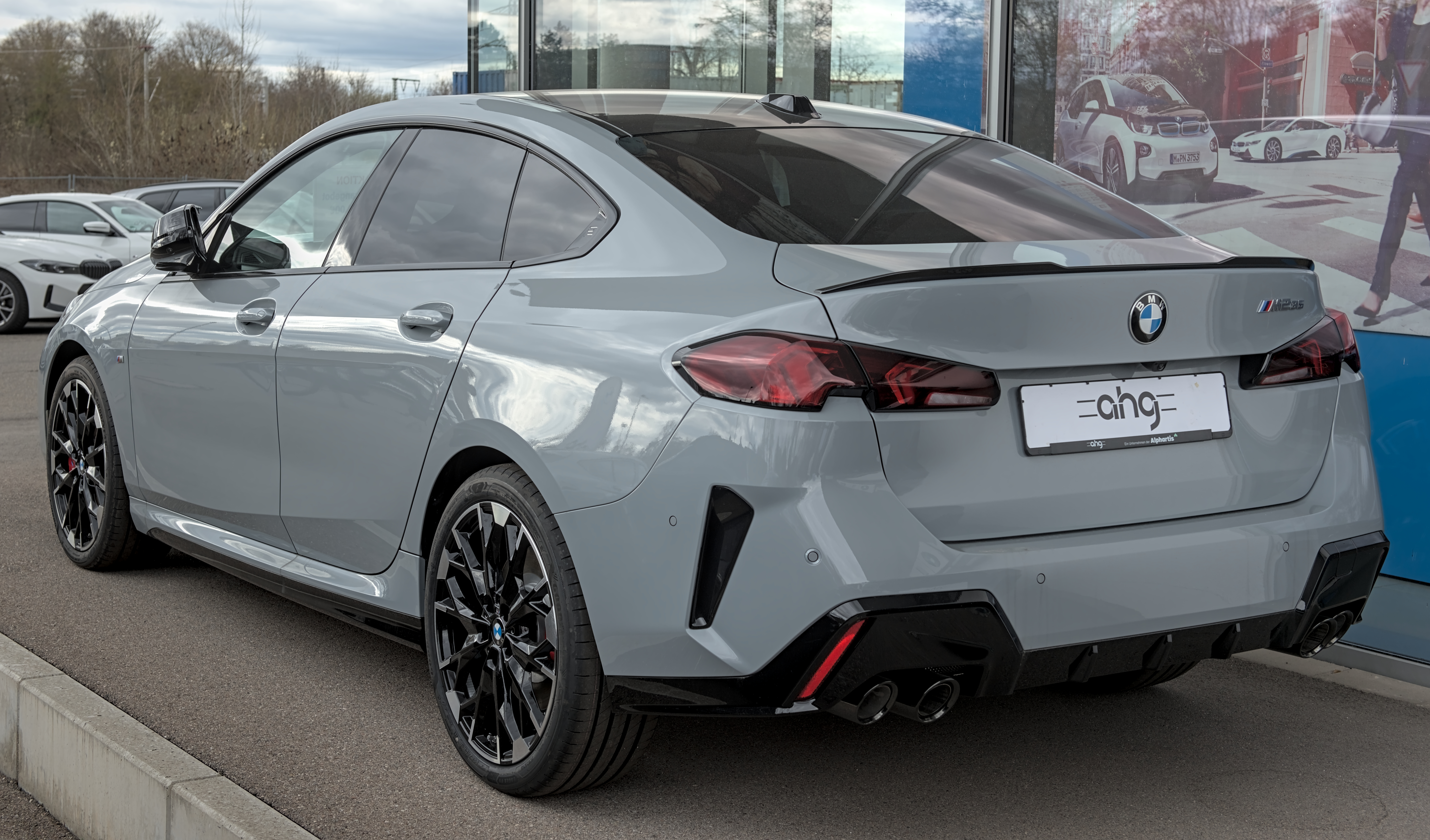
BMW M235 (F74)

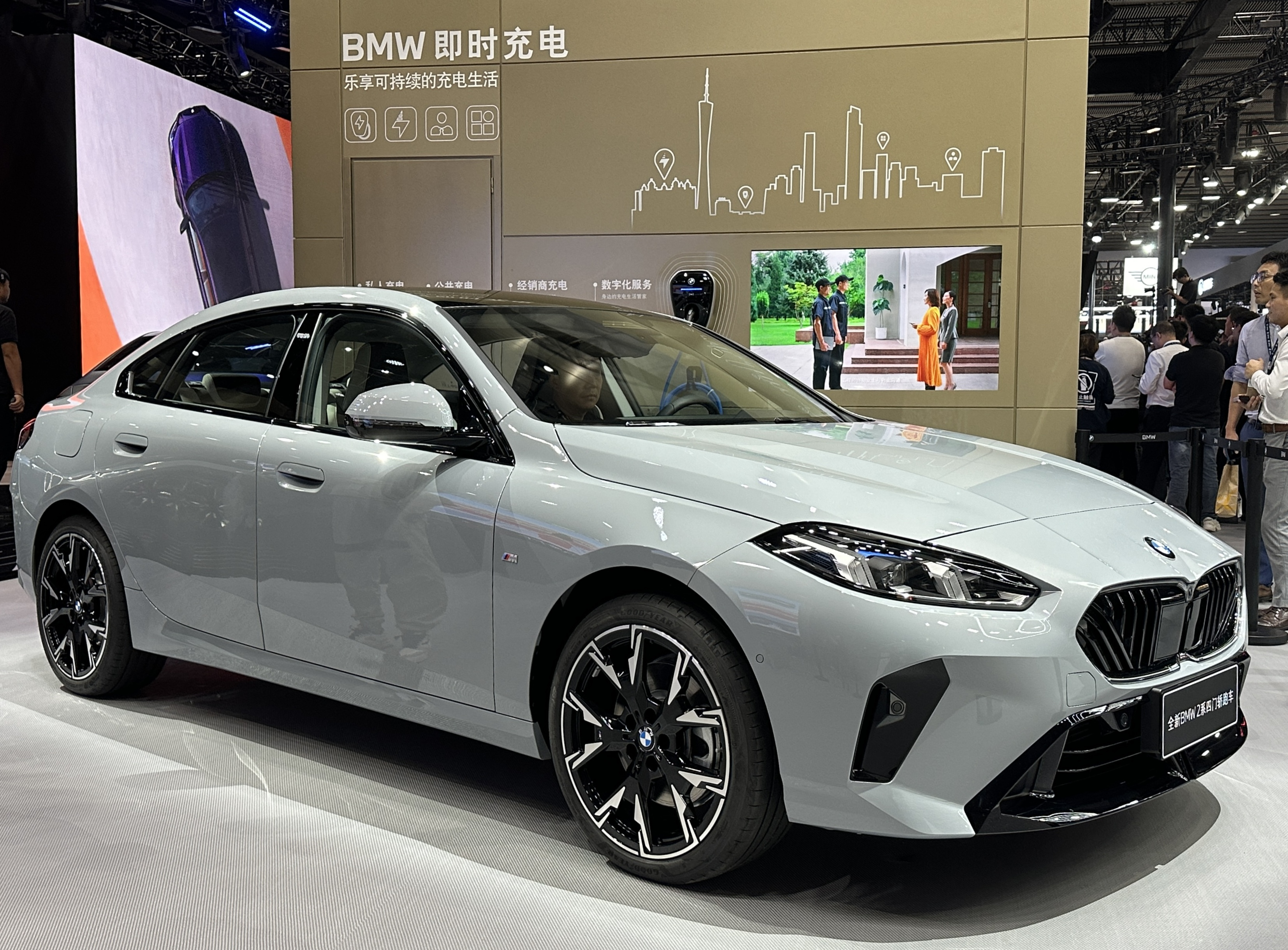
BMW 2 Series Gran Coupé L (F78, China)

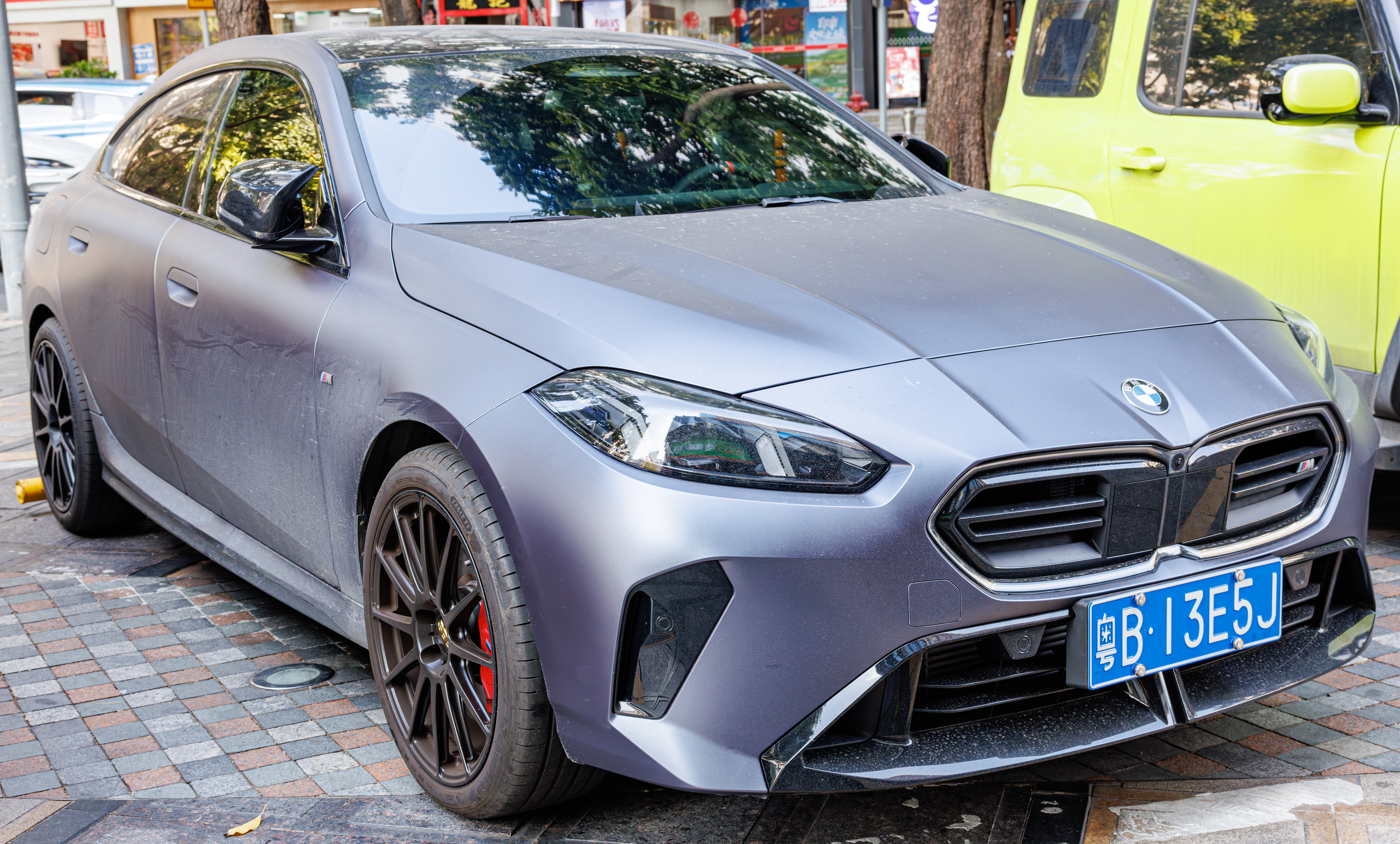
BMW M235L (F78)

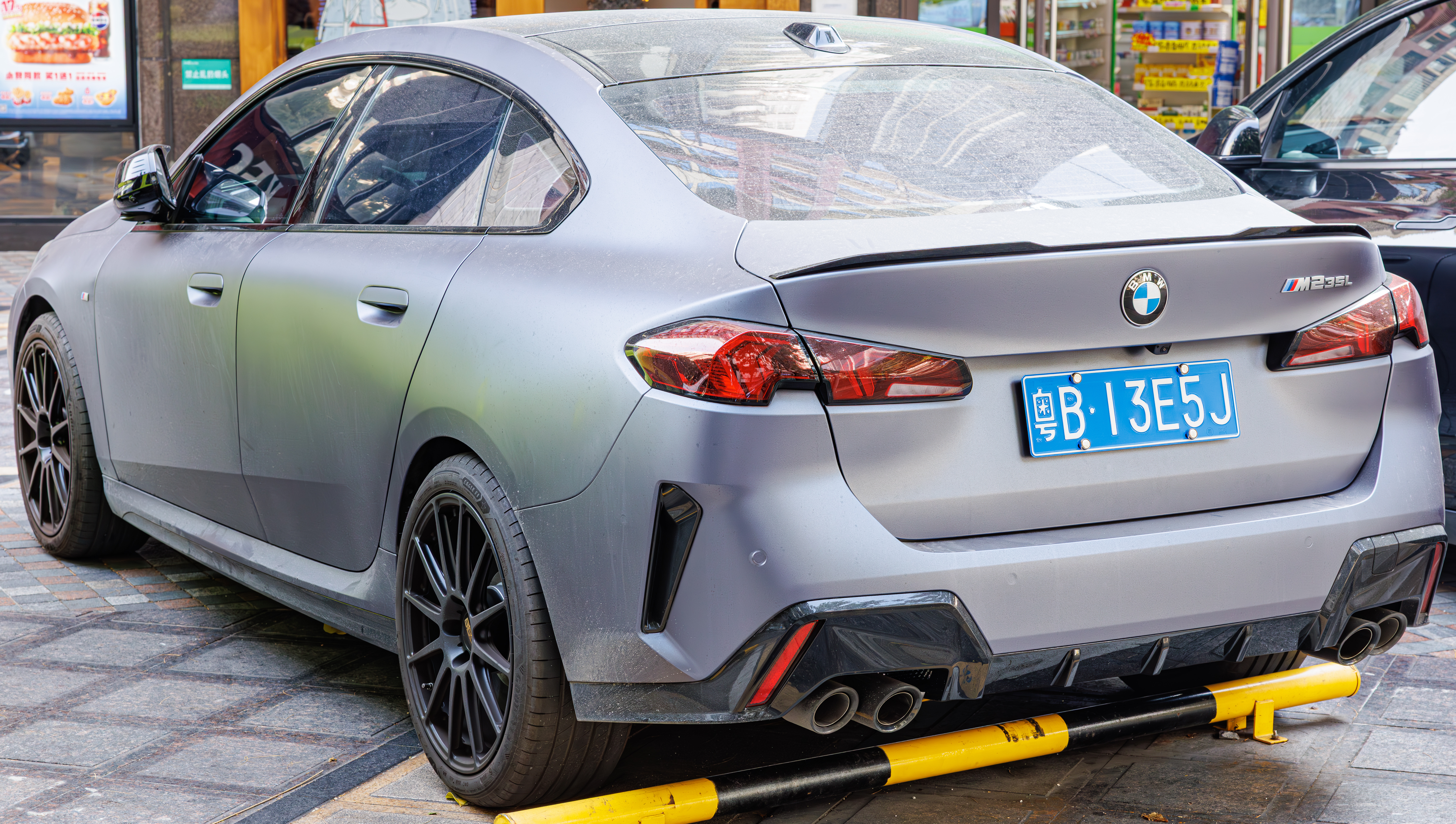
BMW M235L (F78)

=== Safety ===
Euro NCAP test results BMW 1-Series 1.5 M Sport (LHD) (2025)
Test	Points	%
Overall:	4 /5 stars	
Adult occupant:	31.2	78%
Child occupant:	42.3	86%
Pedestrian:	53.9	85%
Safety assist:	14.5	80%

ANCAP test results BMW 2 Series Gran Coupé (2025, aligned with Euro NCAP)
Test	Points	%
Overall:	5 /5 stars	
Adult occupant:	31.24	78%
Child occupant:	42.09	85%
Pedestrian:	53.92	85%
Safety assist:	14.61	81%
