= BMW 1 Series (F52) =

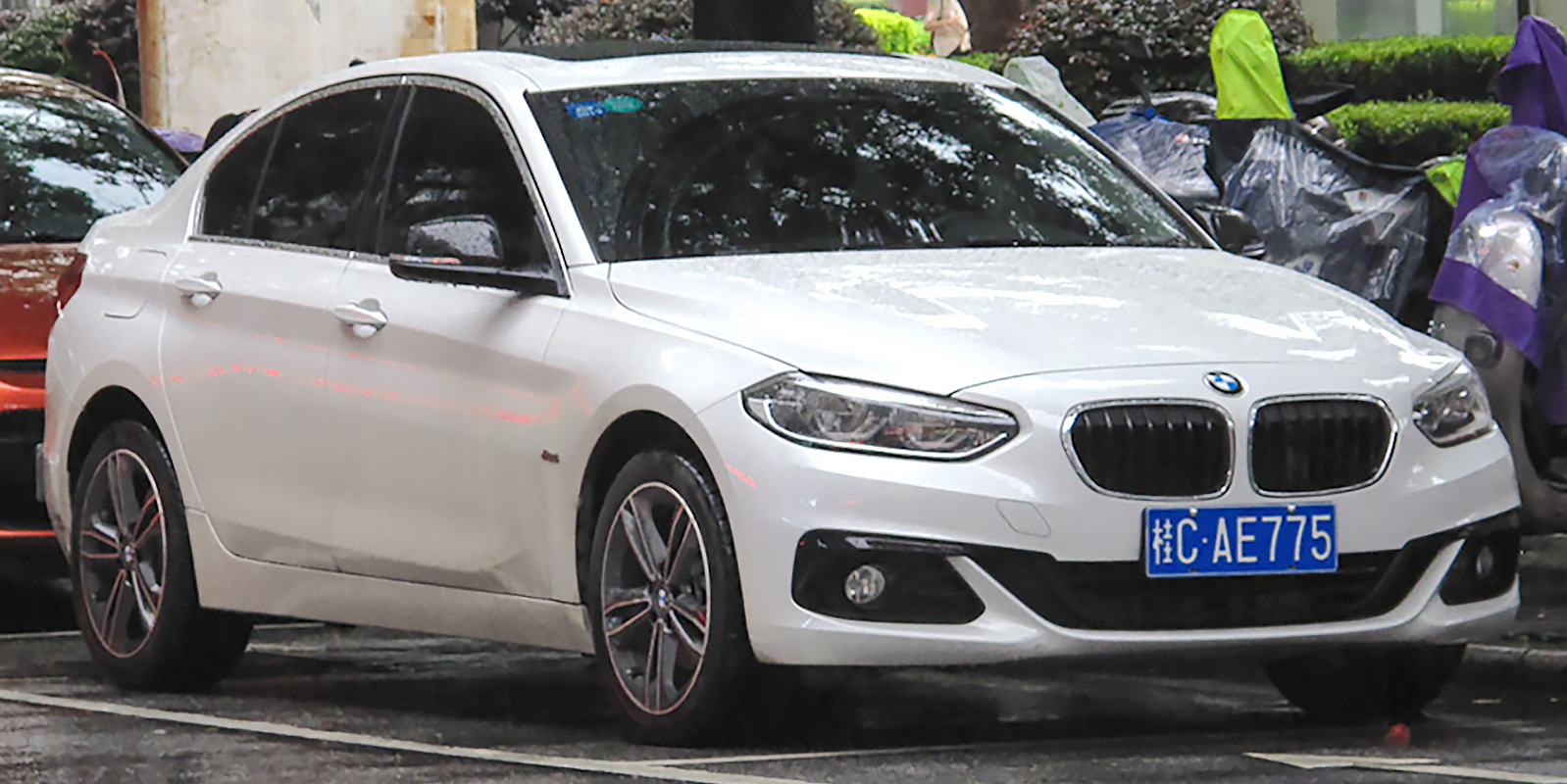

Overview
- Manufacturer: BMW
- Model code: F52
- Production: 2017–2023
- Assembly: China: Tiexi, Shenyang (BBA)
- Designer: Anne Forschner

Body and chassis
- Class: Subcompact executive car
- Body style: 4-door sedan
- Layout: Front-engine, front-wheel-drive
- Platform: BMW UKL2 platform
- Related: BMW 2 Series Active Tourer (F45); BMW X1 (F48); BMW X2 (F39)

Powertrain
- Engine: Petrol: 1.5 L B38 I3 turbo; 2.0 L B48 I4 turbo
- Transmission: 6-speed automatic; 8-speed automatic; 7-speed DCT (Magna 7DCT300)

Dimensions
- Wheelbase: 2,670 mm (105.1 in)
- Length: 4,456 mm (175.4 in)
- Width: 1,803 mm (71.0 in)
- Height: 1,446 mm (56.9 in)

Chronology
- Successor: BMW 2 Series Gran Coupé L (F78)

The BMW 1 Series Sedan (F52) is a subcompact executive sedan developed and produced for the Chinese market, unlike the other variations of the 1 Series, which are manufactured in BMW's plants in Leipzig and Regensburg. This vehicle is manufactured by BMW Brilliance, a joint venture between BMW and Brilliance Auto.

== Overview ==
Unlike the BMW 1 Series hatchback of the time, it uses the front-wheel drive UKL platform. It was first shown at Auto Guangzhou in 2016, and sales started in China in February 2017. The BMW F52 was later sold in Mexico in 2018. The M Sport version went on sale in Mexico on 21 October 2019. However, it is not available in other markets such as Europe, United States, and Canada. Instead, the mechanically similar 2 Series Gran Coupe is offered as BMW's entry-level sedan.

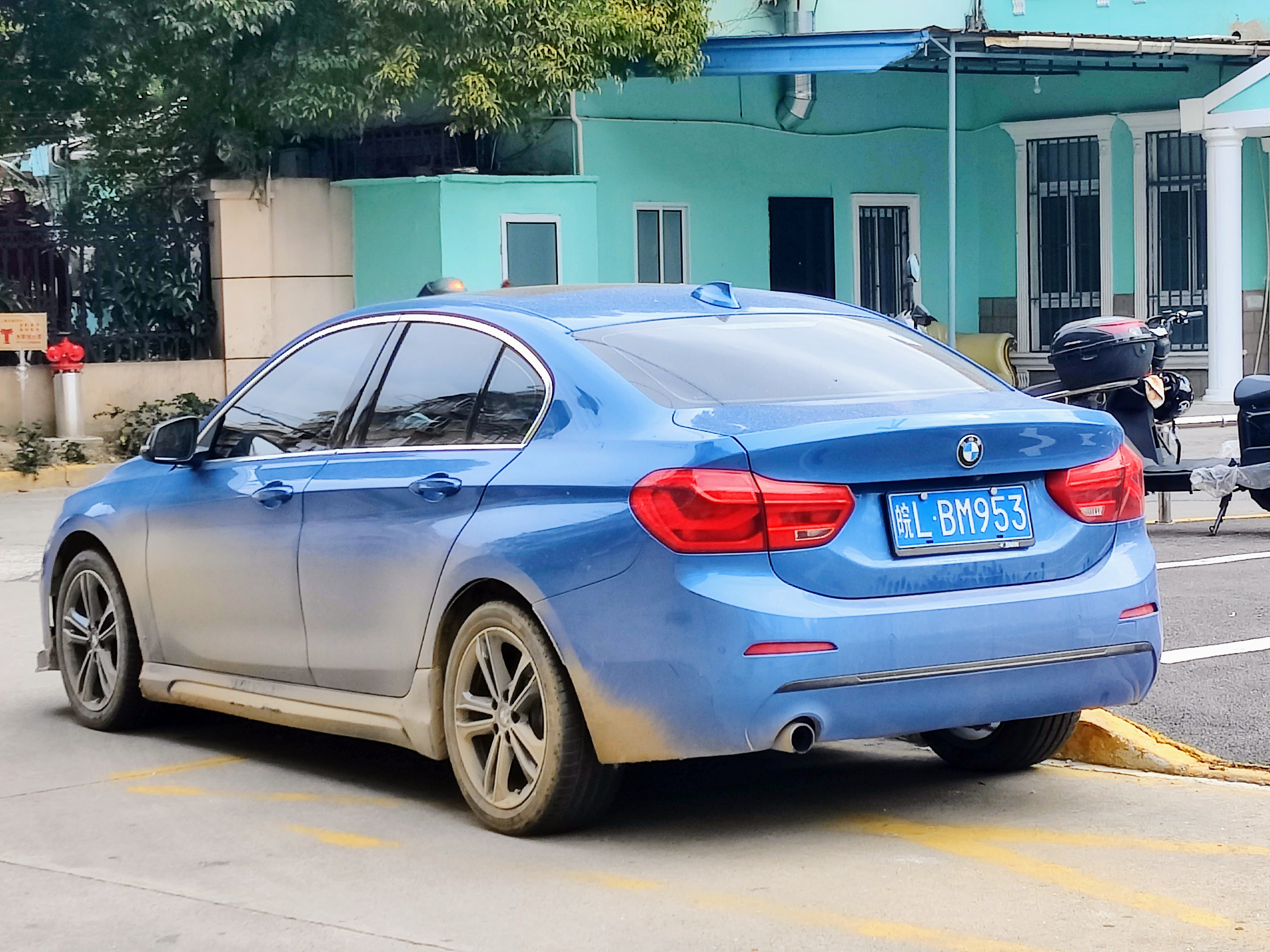
Rear view

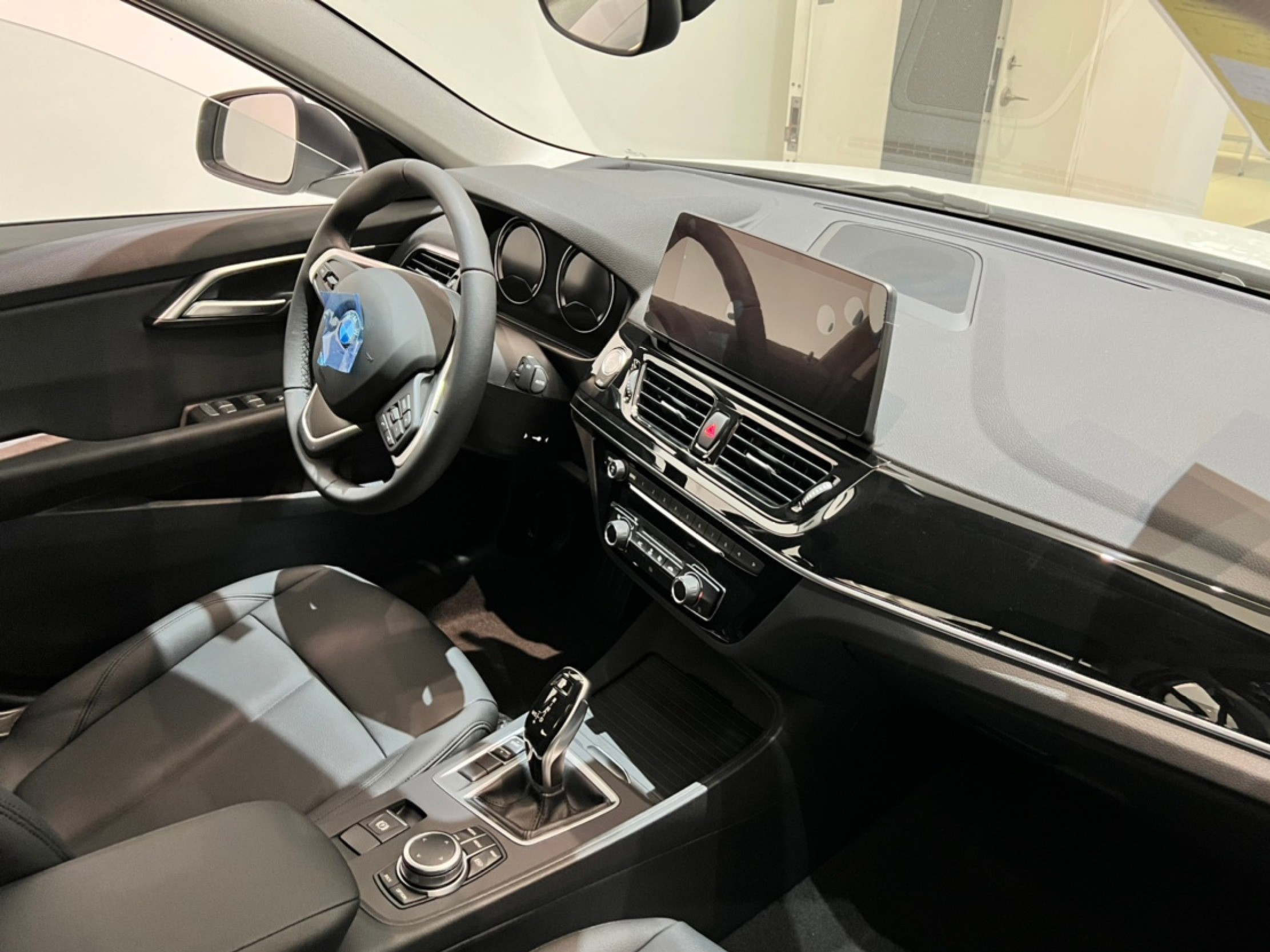
Interior

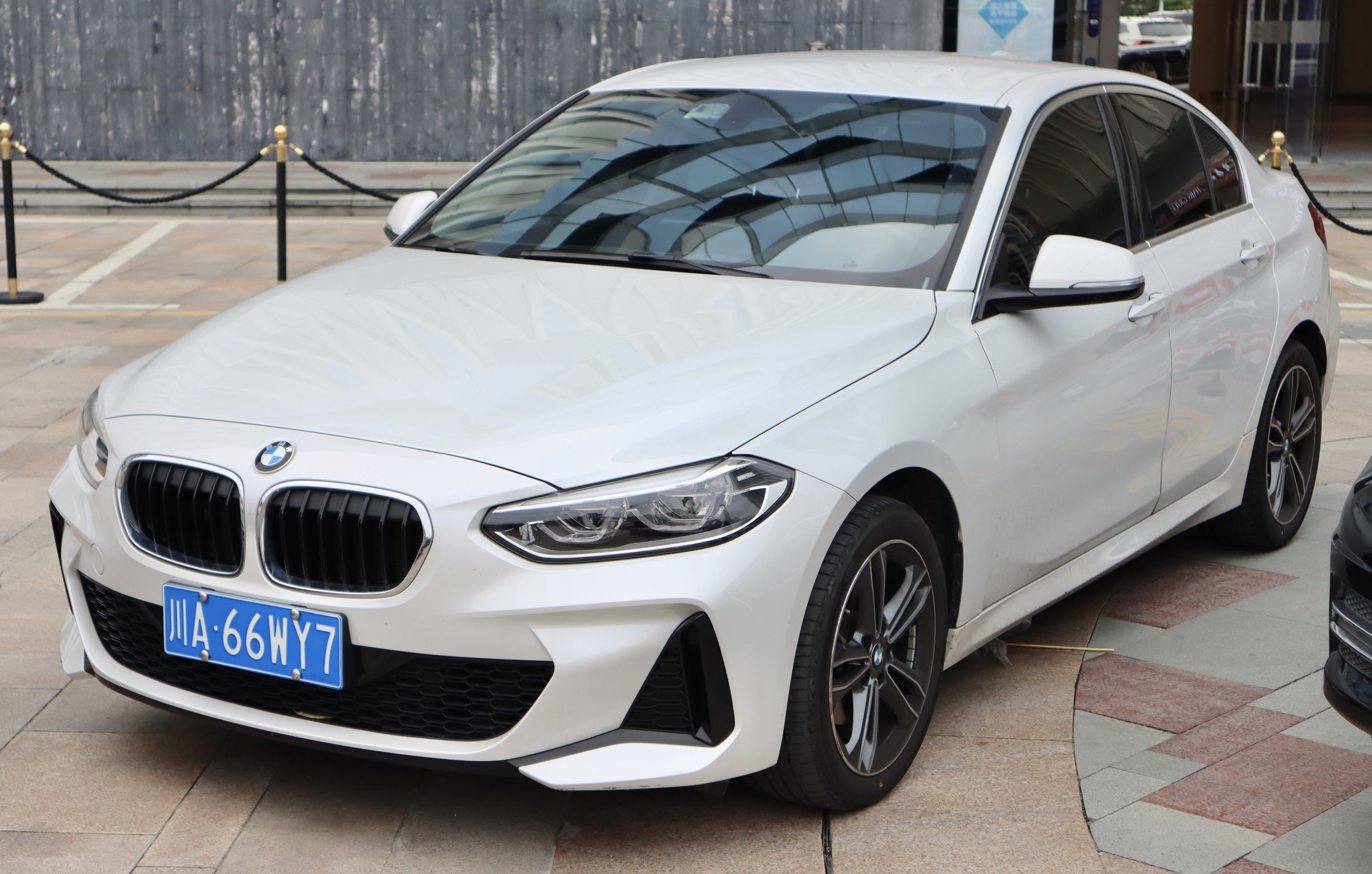
Facelift

== Sales ==
Year	China sales	Mexico sales
2017	34,774	—
2018	40,213	—
2019	43,705	—
2020	39,335	895
2021	36,350	165
2022	24,913	—
