= BMW X1 (U11) =

Third generation of the BMW X1

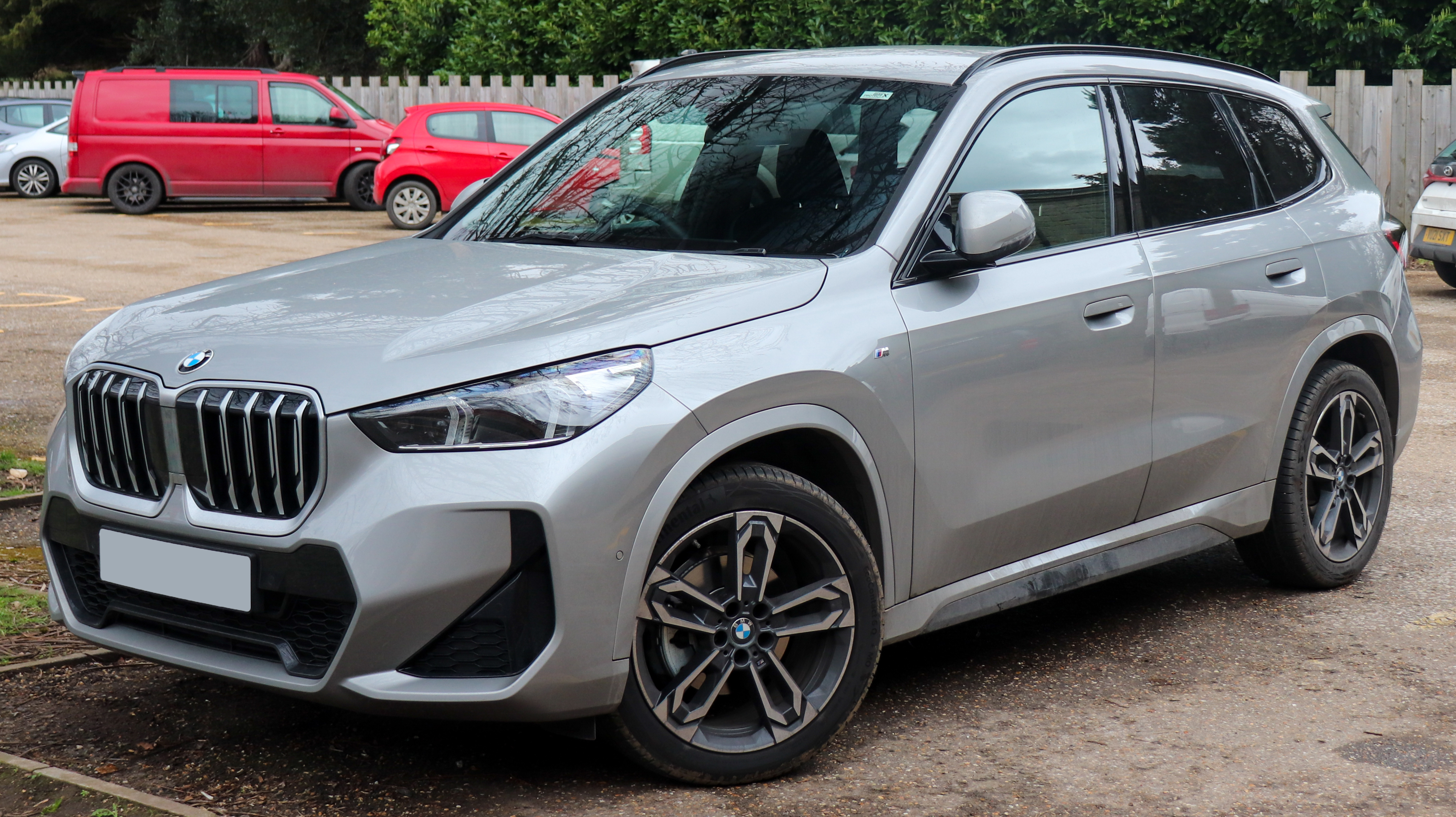

Overview
- Manufacturer: BMW
- Model code: U11; U12 (LWB)
- Also called: BMW iX1 (electric)
- Production: October 2022 – present
- Model years: 2023–present (North America)
- Assembly: Germany: Regensburg; Thailand: Rayong (BMW Thailand); Indonesia: Jakarta (Gaya Motor); Malaysia: Kulim, Kedah (Inokom); India: Chennai (BMW India); China: Tiexi, Shenyang (BBA)
- Designer: Jacek Pepłowski

Body and chassis
- Class: Subcompact luxury crossover SUV
- Body style: 5-door SUV
- Layout: Front-engine, front-wheel-drive; Front-engine, all-wheel-drive (xDrive); Front-motor, front-wheel-drive (iX1 eDrive20); Dual-motor, four-wheel-drive (iX1 xDrive30)
- Platform: BMW UKL2 platform
- Related: BMW X2 (U10); BMW 2 Series Active Tourer (U06); Mini Countryman (U25)

Powertrain
- Engine: Petrol: 1.5 L B38 turbo I3; Petrol hybrid: 2.0 L B48 turbo I4 mild hybrid; Petrol plug-in hybrid: 1.5 L B38A15M0 turbo I3; Diesel hybrid: 2.0 L B47 twin-scroll turbo I4 mild hybrid
- Electric motor: List: 14 kW (19 PS; 19 hp) 48V power booster (MHEV); 81 kW (110 PS; 109 hp) permanent-magnet synchronous motor (X1 xDrive25e PHEV); 130 kW (177 PS; 174 hp) permanent-magnet synchronous motor (X1 xDrive30e PHEV); 2x BMW eDrive 5.0 M170SF/M170SR permanently excited synchronous motors (PSM) (iX1)
- Power output: List: 90 kW (122 PS; 121 hp) (X1 sDrive16i); 100 kW (136 PS; 134 hp) (X1 sDrive18i); 160 kW (218 PS; 215 hp) (X1 xDrive23i); 183 kW (249 PS; 245 hp) (X1 xDrive25e); 240 kW (326 PS; 322 hp) (X1 xDrive30e); 110 kW (150 PS; 148 hp) (X1 sDrive18d); 145 kW (197 PS; 194 hp) (X1 xDrive23d); 233 kW (317 PS; 312 hp) (iX1 xDrive30)
- Transmission: 7-speed DCT wet Getrag 7DCT300; Single-speed automatic (iX1)
- Hybrid drivetrain: Mild Hybrid (MHEV) Plug-in Hybrid (PHEV)
- Battery: 16.3 kWh lithium-ion (PHEV); 64.7 kWh lithium-ion (iX1)

Dimensions
- Wheelbase: 2,692 mm (106.0 in); 2,802 mm (110.3 in) (LWB)
- Length: 4,500 mm (177.2 in); 4,505 mm (177.4 in) (M35i); 4,616 mm (181.7 in) (LWB)
- Width: 1,845 mm (72.6 in)
- Height: 1,642 mm (64.6 in)
- Kerb weight: 1,500–1,690 kg (3,307–3,726 lb)

Chronology
- Predecessor: BMW X1 (F48)

The third generation of the BMW X1 consists of the U11 (short wheelbase) and the U12 (long wheelbase) subcompact luxury crossover SUVs. Continuing in the way of the previous generation, this model is based on the modular UKL2 platform, which categorises compact, front-wheel drive based vehicles such as the 2 Series Active Tourer multi-purpose vehicle and the Mini Countryman crossover SUV. The U11 offers a range of petrol, diesel, plug-in hybrid, and battery electric models. Specific petrol and diesel models utilize a mild hybrid powertrain.

Undifferentiated from the previous generation, front-wheel drive models are marketed sDrive, whereas all-wheel drive models are marketed as xDrive. The vehicle measures 4,500 mm (177.2 in), which is 61 mm (2.4 in) longer than its predecessor. Long wheelbase models are marketed exclusively in the Chinese market, and is currently 4,616 mm (181.7 in), which is 51 mm (2.0 in) longer than the previous LWB model.

== Overview ==
The third-generation X1 was revealed on 1 June 2022, and launched in October 2022 for select markets. Officially longer than the F48 and E84, the U11 is roughly 70mm shorter than the first-generation BMW X3. BMW predicts 41 per cent of the X1s will be petrol models, while 31 per cent will be battery electric, leaving the remainder to be the plug-in hybrid and diesel.

An M Sport package is available that adds adaptive suspension (available for the first time on the X1), a lower ride height, and interior and exterior styling elements. The package also includes sport seats and launch control with paddle shifters on the M-Sport steering wheel.

In June 2023, the M35i xDrive was announced. The M35i xDrive uses 2.0-litre I4 turbocharged engine which generates 300 hp (224 kW; 304 PS) / 400 N⋅m (40.8 kg⋅m; 295 lb⋅ft) of power and torque respectively. For selected countries and the United States, it generates an additional 17 hp (13 kW; 17 PS). It accelerates from 0–60 mph (0–97 km/h) in 5.4 seconds and its top speed is limited to 250 km/h (155 mph). Deliveries for the United States begin in October 2023 while deliveries for the rest of the world begin in November 2023.

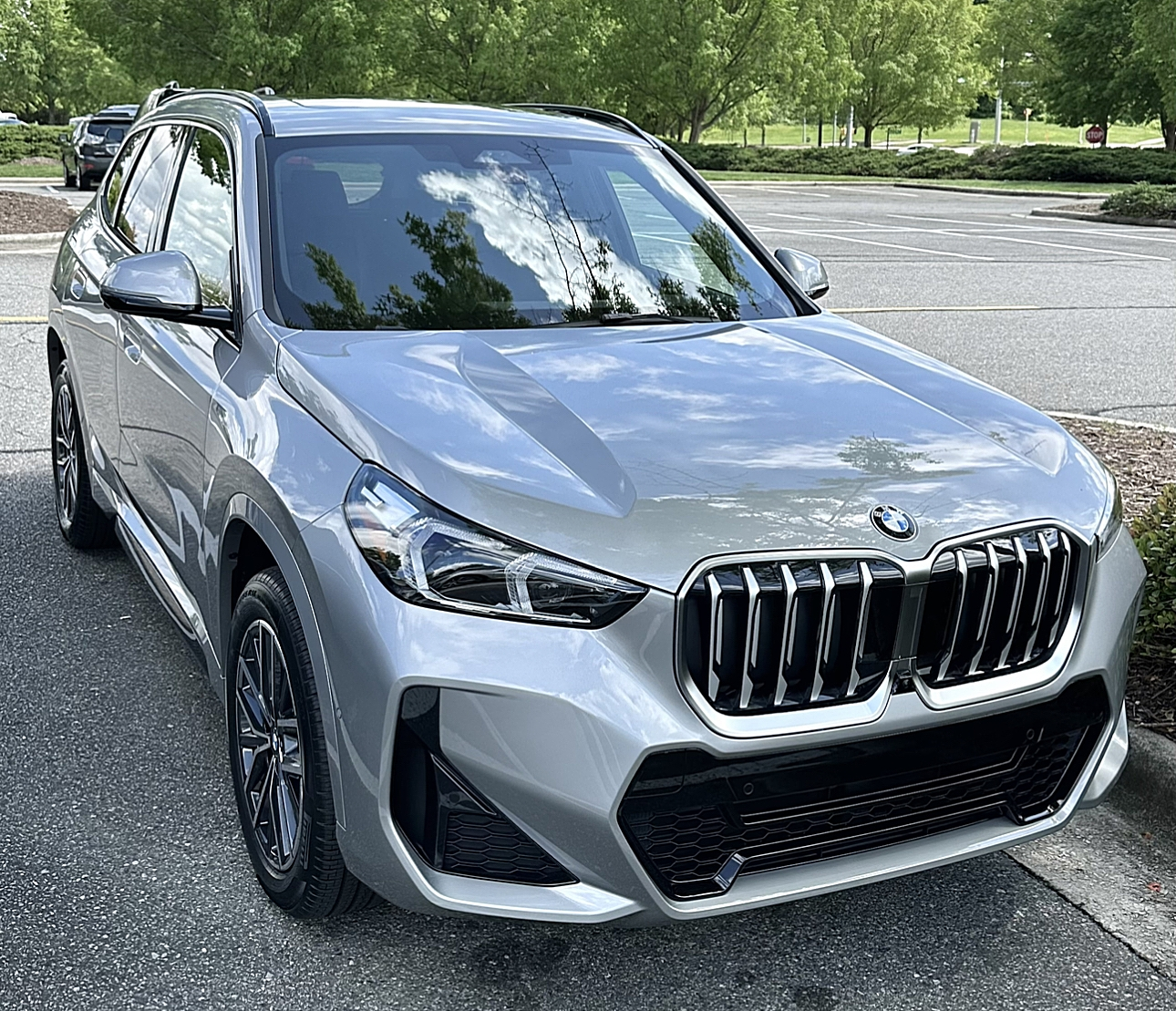
Front View with M Sport Package

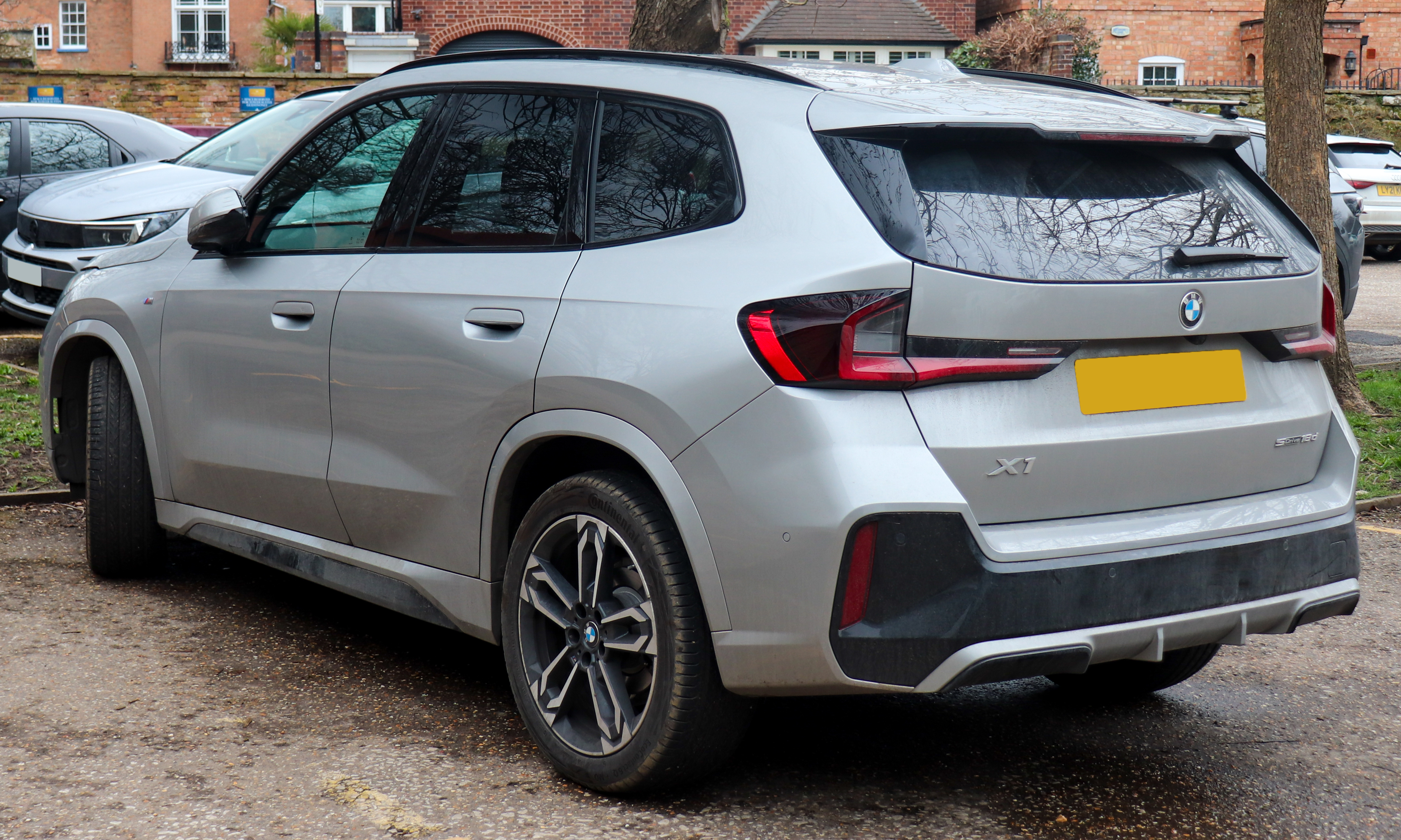
Rear view with M Sport Package

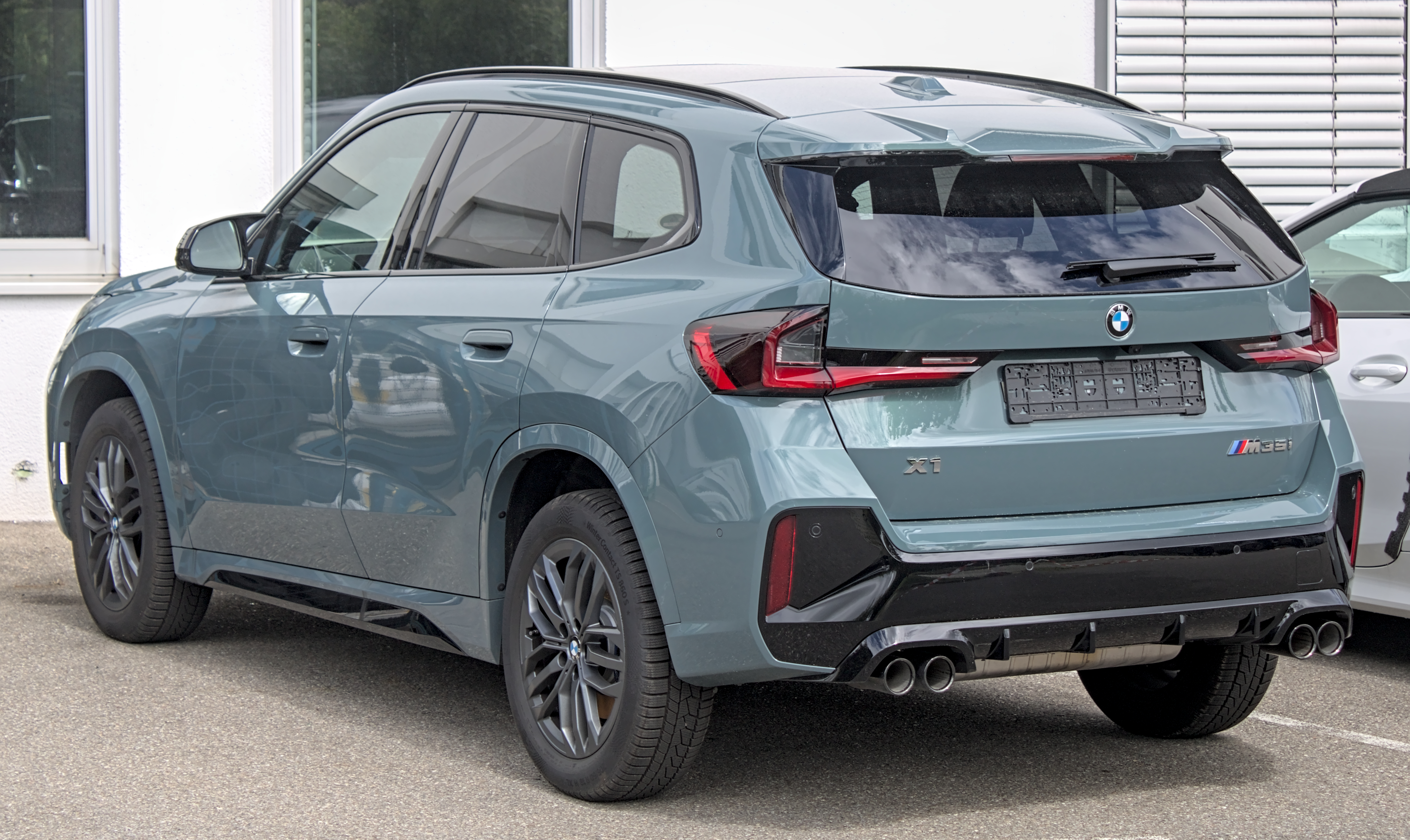
M35i Rear View

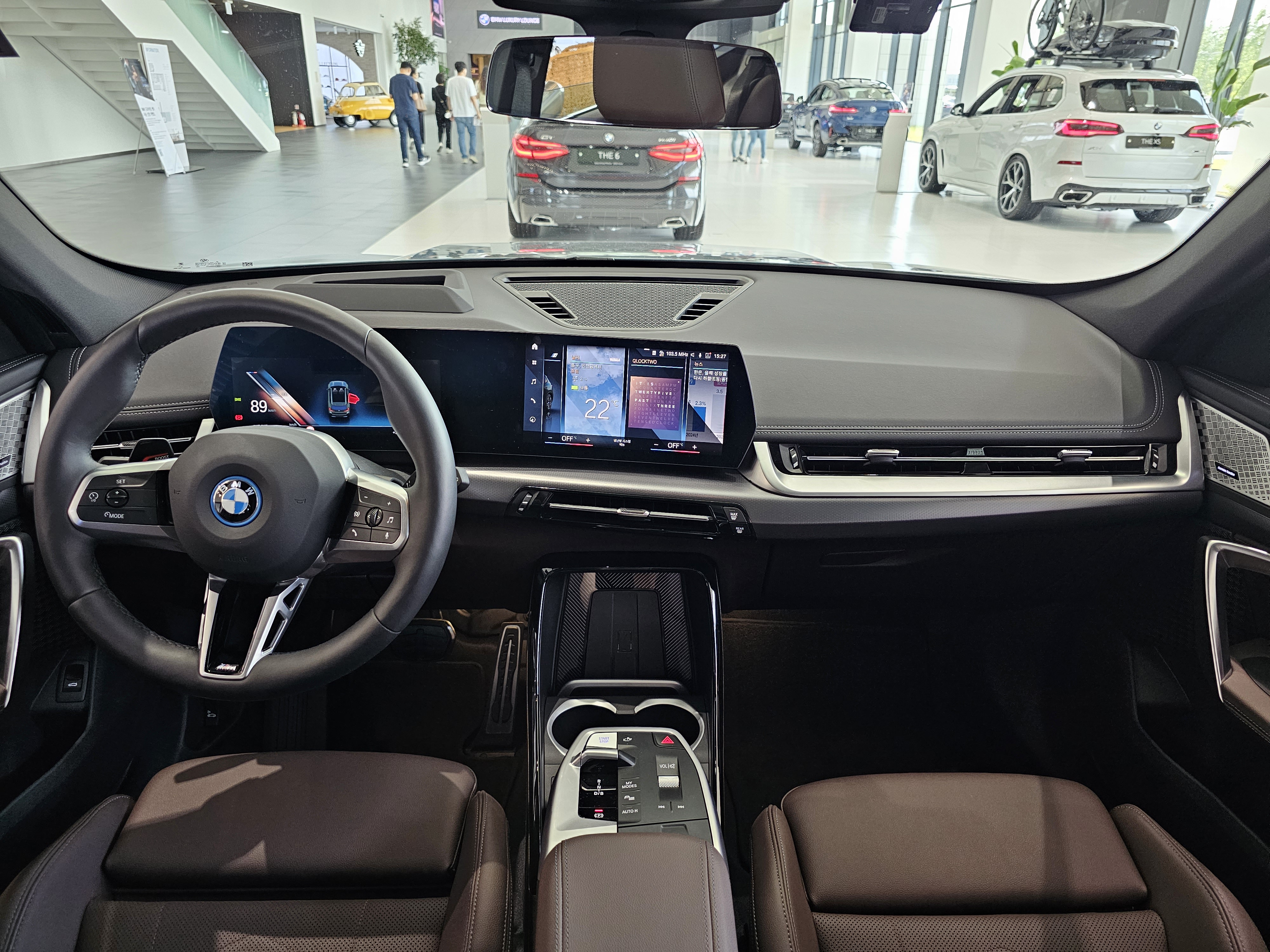
Interior

== Features ==
Heated front seats are available on the sDrive18i, as well as a heated steering wheel which is available via a subscription on the BMW ConnectedDrive store. For the X1 sold in the US, the optional Active Seats with Lumbar Support includes massaging seat function for both front seats. Massaging seat intensity and timer can only be controlled from the touchscreen. Models in the US receive dual-zone automatic climate control, ambient interior lighting, and a power liftgate. A panoramic sunroof is part of the Convenience package.

BMW has introduced the new, dual-screen "Curved Display" onto the X1, which combines a 10.25-inch digital dial display, and a high-definition 10.7-inch infotainment screen which run the eighth generation BMW iDrive infotainment system. Navigation, Apple CarPlay, Android Auto, and the SiriusXM satellite radio is standard for all models. Wireless charging is standard on the Convenience package. For the Premium package, the X1 receives Harman Kardon audio system, 360° camera, and a head-up display.

Safety systems consist of: the Driving Assistant Professional which maintains speed, lane, and distance, Parking Assistant Plus, which conveniences parking in tighter spots, and the Reversing Assistant, which remembers steering movements for the previous 50 metres and can automatically return the vehicle precisely to the previously travelled path.

Wheel sizes in the US range from 19- to 20-inch, however in Australia, sizes range from 18- to 19-inch.

== Markets ==
=== Europe ===
The X1 arrived in Europe in late 2022 which includes all models except the sDrive16i.

=== Australia ===
The X1 had arrived in Australia in the final quarter of 2022 with sDrive18i and xDrive20i models. Packages consist of the Enhancement Package, available on the sDrive18i and xDrive20i, and the M Sport Package, available only on the xDrive20i.

=== North America ===
The X1 arrived in the US in the final quarter of 2022, for the 2023 model year. Initially, the lineup consisted only of the xDrive28i, but in 2024 the M35i was added. All models use an all-wheel drive layout. Packages include the Premium and Convenience.

=== China ===
The X1 in China is sold exclusively as the long wheelbase U12 model. The models include the sDrive18Li, sDrive20Li, and xDrive20Li, as well as the battery electric xDrive30L. The front-wheel-drive iX1, the 'eDrive25L', is scheduled for March 2024.

=== India ===
The X1 was launched in India on 28 January 2023, and is locally manufactured at BMW's Chennai factory. Both petrol and diesel engines are available.

The electric BMW X1, iX1, was launched in India on September 28, 2023, priced at ₹ 66.90 lakh. At the Bharat Mobility Show 2025 on January 17, 2025, BMW introduced a long-wheelbase, locally assembled version of the electric SUV, priced at ₹ 49 lakh.

=== Thailand ===
The X1 was launched in Thailand on 28 February 2023 with the sole sDrive18i model. Later the xDrive30e model was added on 22 May 2023, and the sDrive20i model has also been added on 30 June 2023.

The electric BMW iX1 eDrive20L was launched in Thailand on 3 July 2025, Imported from China.

== Powertrain ==
Models for specific Asian and African countries start at the sDrive16i model which uses a front-wheel drive layout, and has an output of output of 122 hp (91 kW) and 230 N⋅m (170 lbf⋅ft). For most countries, models start at the sDrive18i, which has an output of 136 hp (101 kW) and 230 N⋅m (170 lbf⋅ft), and the sDrive20i which has an output of 170 hp (130 kW) and 240 N⋅m (180 lbf⋅ft). Both models use a 1,499 cc (1.5 L) B38 inline-three turbocharged engine. The xDrive23i uses a B48 inline-four turbocharged mild hybrid powertrain, and uses an all-wheel drive layout. It has an output of 218 hp (163 kW) and 320 N⋅m (240 lbf⋅ft). Exclusive to North American markets is the xDrive28i, which utilizes a variant of the B48 that makes 241 hp (180 kW) and 295 lb⋅ft (400 N⋅m) of torque and is only available in AWD.

Diesel models consist of the sDrive18d, which has an output of 150 hp (112 kW) and 360 N⋅m (266 lbf⋅ft), the xDrive20d, which has an output of 163 hp (122 kW) and 360 N⋅m (266 lbf⋅ft), and the xDrive23d which has an output of 211 hp (157 kW) and 400 N⋅m (295 lbf⋅ft). All diesel models use a B47 twin turbo inline-four engine. PHEV models consist of the xDrive25e which has an output of 245 hp (183 kW) and 230 N⋅m (170 lbf⋅ft), and the xDrive30e with an output of 326 hp (243 kW) and 494 N⋅m (364 lbf⋅ft) which both use a B38 engine inline-three turbocharged engine, combined with a permanent-magnet synchronous motor.

Mild hybrid models utilize a 48-volt mild hybrid which includes an electric motor/power-booster rated at 19 hp (14 kW) and 55 N⋅m (41 lbf⋅ft). The mild hybrid system also features a 20 Ah battery in the luggage compartment, which was added to increase efficiency and power delivery.

For plug-in hybrid models, charging via an AC charger (using a Type 2 connector) can handle a capacity of 7.4 kilowatts will take a total of 2.5 hours, down from 3.2 hours. Because of the fifth generation BMW eDrive technology, PHEV models receive more fully-electric range compared to the previous generation. 25e PHEV model, the WLTP-rated range extends from 71–83 km (44–52 mi). For the 30e PHEV, the WLTP-rated range extends from 70–82 km (43–51 mi).

All models except the iX1 use a 7-speed Steptronic automatic transmission.

Type	Model	Engine code	Displacement	Power	Torque	Combined system output	Electric motor	Battery	Top speed	0–100 km/h (0–62 mph)	Transmission	Layout	Cal. years
Petrol	sDrive16i	B38	1,499 cc (1.5 L) I3 turbo	91 kW (122 hp; 124 PS) @ 4,400-6,500 rpm	230 N⋅m (23.5 kg⋅m; 170 lb⋅ft) @ 1,500-4,000 rpm	-	-	-	200 km/h (124 mph)	10.5 sec	7-speed Steptronic automatic	FWD	2023–present
Petrol	sDrive18i	B38	1,499 cc (1.5 L) I3 turbo	100 kW (134 hp; 136 PS) @ 4,400-6,500 rpm	230 N⋅m (23.5 kg⋅m; 170 lb⋅ft) @ 1,500-4,000 rpm	-	-	-	208 km/h (129 mph)	9.2 sec	7-speed Steptronic automatic	FWD	2023–present
Petrol	sDrive18i	B38	1,499 cc (1.5 L) I3 turbo	115 kW (154 hp; 156 PS) @ 4,900-6,500 rpm	230 N⋅m (23.5 kg⋅m; 170 lb⋅ft) @ 1,500-4,600 rpm	-	-	-	215 km/h (134 mph)	9 sec	7-speed Steptronic automatic	FWD	2023–present
Petrol mild hybrid	sDrive20i	B38	1,499 cc (1.5 L) I3 turbo	125 kW (168 hp; 170 PS) @ 4,700-6,500 rpm Motor: 14 kW (19 hp; 19 PS)	240 N⋅m (24.5 kg⋅m; 177 lb⋅ft) @ 1,500-4,000 rpm Motor: 55 N⋅m (5.61 kg⋅m; 40.6 lb⋅ft)	-	48 V power booster	20 Ah rear battery	216 km/h (134 mph)	8.3 sec	7-speed Steptronic automatic	FWD	2023–present
Petrol	sDrive20i (Brazil)	B48	1,999 cc (2.0 L) I4 turbo	151 kW (202 hp; 205 PS) @ 4,700-6,500 rpm	300 N⋅m (30.6 kg⋅m; 221 lb⋅ft) @ 1,500-4,000 rpm	-	-	-	236 km/h (146 mph)	7.6 sec	7-speed Steptronic automatic	FWD	2023–present
Petrol mild hybrid	xDrive23i	B48	1,998 cc (2.0 L) I4 turbo	160 kW (215 hp; 218 PS) @ 5,000-6,500 rpm Motor: 14 kW (19 hp; 19 PS)	320 N⋅m (32.6 kg⋅m; 236 lb⋅ft) @ 1,500-4,000 rpm Motor: 55 N⋅m (5.61 kg⋅m; 40.6 lb⋅ft)	-	48 V power booster	20 Ah rear battery	233 km/h (145 mph)	7.1 sec	7-speed Steptronic automatic	AWD	2023–present
Petrol	xDrive28i	B48	1,998 cc (2.0 L) I4 turbo	180 kW (241 hp; 244 PS) @ 4,500 rpm	400 N⋅m (40.8 kg⋅m; 295 lb⋅ft)@ 1,500 rpm	-	-	-	250 km/h (155 mph)	6.2 sec	7-speed Steptronic automatic	AWD	2023–present
Petrol	M35i	B48	1,998 cc (2.0 L) I4 turbo	221 kW (296 hp; 300 PS)* @ 5,750-6,500 rpm	400 N⋅m (40.8 kg⋅m; 295 lb⋅ft) @ 2,000-4,500 rpm	-	-	-	250 km/h (155 mph)	5.4 sec	7-speed Steptronic automatic	AWD	2024–present
Diesel	sDrive18d	B47	1,995 cc (2.0 L) I4 turbo	110 kW (148 hp; 150 PS) @ 3,750-4,000 rpm	360 N⋅m (36.7 kg⋅m; 266 lb⋅ft) @ 1,500-2,500 rpm	-	-	-	210 km/h (130 mph)	8.9 sec	7-speed Steptronic automatic	FWD	2024–present
Diesel	sDrive18d	B47	1,995 cc (2.0 L) I4 turbo	110 kW (148 hp; 150 PS) @ 3,750-4,000 rpm	360 N⋅m (36.7 kg⋅m; 266 lb⋅ft) @ 1,500-2,500 rpm	-	-	-	210 km/h (130 mph)	8.9 sec	7-speed Steptronic automatic	FWD	2023–present
Diesel mild hybrid	xDrive20d	B47	1,995 cc (2.0 L) I4 turbo	120 kW (161 hp; 163 PS) @ 3,750-4,000 rpm Motor: 14 kW (19 hp; 19 PS)	360 N⋅m (36.7 kg⋅m; 266 lb⋅ft) @ 1,500-2,500 rpm Motor: 55 N⋅m (5.61 kg⋅m; 40.6 lb⋅ft)	-	48 V power booster	20 Ah rear battery	210 km/h (130 mph)	8.6 sec	7-speed Steptronic automatic	AWD	2023–present
Diesel mild hybrid	xDrive20d	B47	1,995 cc (2.0 L) I4 turbo	120 kW (161 hp; 163 PS) @ 3,750-4,000 rpm Motor: 14 kW (19 hp; 19 PS)	360 N⋅m (36.7 kg⋅m; 266 lb⋅ft) @ 1,500-2,500 rpm Motor: 55 N⋅m (5.61 kg⋅m; 40.6 lb⋅ft)	-	48 V power booster	20 Ah rear battery	210 km/h (130 mph)	8.6 sec	7-speed Steptronic automatic	AWD	2023–present
Diesel mild hybrid	xDrive23d	B47	1,995 cc (2.0 L) I4 turbo	155 kW (208 hp; 211 PS) @ 4,000 rpm Motor: 14 kW (19 hp; 19 PS)	400 N⋅m (40.8 kg⋅m; 295 lb⋅ft) @ 1,500-2,750 rpm Motor: 55 N⋅m (5.61 kg⋅m; 40.6 lb⋅ft)	-	48 V power booster	20 Ah rear battery	225 km/h (140 mph)	7.4 sec	7-speed Steptronic automatic	AWD	2023–present
Diesel mild hybrid	xDrive23d	B47	1,995 cc (2.0 L) I4 turbo	155 kW (208 hp; 211 PS) @ 4,000 rpm Motor: 14 kW (19 hp; 19 PS)	400 N⋅m (40.8 kg⋅m; 295 lb⋅ft) @ 1,500-2,750 rpm Motor: 55 N⋅m (5.61 kg⋅m; 40.6 lb⋅ft)	-	48 V power booster	20 Ah rear battery	225 km/h (140 mph)	7.4 sec	7-speed Steptronic automatic	AWD	2023–present
Petrol plug-in hybrid	xDrive25e	B38A15M0	1,499 cc (1.5 L) I3 turbo	Engine: 100 kW (134 hp; 136 PS) @ 4,400-6,500 rpm Motor: 80 kW (107 hp; 109 PS)	Engine: 230 N⋅m (23.5 kg⋅m; 170 lb⋅ft) @ 1,500-4,400 rpm Motor: 247 N⋅m (25.2 kg⋅m; 182 lb⋅ft)	180 kW (241 hp; 245 PS)	Permanent-magnet synchronous	16.3 kWh lithium-ion	200 km/h (124 mph)	6.8 sec	7-speed Steptronic automatic	AWD	2023–present
Petrol plug-in hybrid	xDrive25e	B38A15M0	1,499 cc (1.5 L) I3 turbo	Engine: 100 kW (134 hp; 136 PS) @ 4,400-6,500 rpm Motor: 80 kW (107 hp; 109 PS)	Engine: 230 N⋅m (23.5 kg⋅m; 170 lb⋅ft) @ 1,500-4,400 rpm Motor: 247 N⋅m (25.2 kg⋅m; 182 lb⋅ft)	180 kW (241 hp; 245 PS)	Permanent-magnet synchronous	16.3 kWh lithium-ion	200 km/h (124 mph)	6.8 sec	7-speed Steptronic automatic	AWD	2023–present
Petrol plug-in hybrid	xDrive30e	B38A15M0	1,499 cc (1.5 L) I3 turbo	Engine: 110 kW (148 hp; 150 PS) @ 4,700-6,500 rpm Motor: 130 kW (174 hp; 177 PS)	Engine: 230 N⋅m (23.5 kg⋅m; 170 lb⋅ft) @ 1,500-4,400 rpm Motor: 247 N⋅m (25.2 kg⋅m; 182 lb⋅ft)	240 kW (322 hp; 326 PS)	Permanent-magnet synchronous	16.3 kWh lithium-ion	205 km/h (127 mph)	5.4 sec	7-speed Steptronic automatic	AWD	2023–present

* 233 kW (312 hp) for selected countries such as the US

== BMW iX1 ==
The BMW iX1 is a battery electric version of the X1 U11. The iX1 was released on 11 November 2022 as the xDrive30. It features a 64.7 kWh lithium-ion battery, and dual motors placed at each axle for an all-wheel drive layout. Its power and torque output is rated at 309 hp (230 kW; 313 PS) and 494 N⋅m (50.4 kg⋅m; 364 lb⋅ft) respectively.

In September 2023, a front-wheel drive model, known as the "eDrive20" was introduced. It features one motor, and has an output of 201 hp (150 kW; 204 PS) and 247 N⋅m (25.2 kg⋅m; 182 lb⋅ft). Its battery remains a 64.7 kWh lithium-ion. All iX1 models feature an optional cyan exterior trim, with a drag coefficient of 0.26. Top speed for the eDrive20 is 170 km/h (106 mph), however for the xDrive30, its top speed is 180 km/h (112 mph). Charging for the xDrive30 using an AC charger (0-100%) takes 6.5 hours with a charging capacity of 11 kW. Using a DC fast-charger, charging for the xDrive30 (0-80%) takes 29 minutes with a maximum rate of 130 kW.

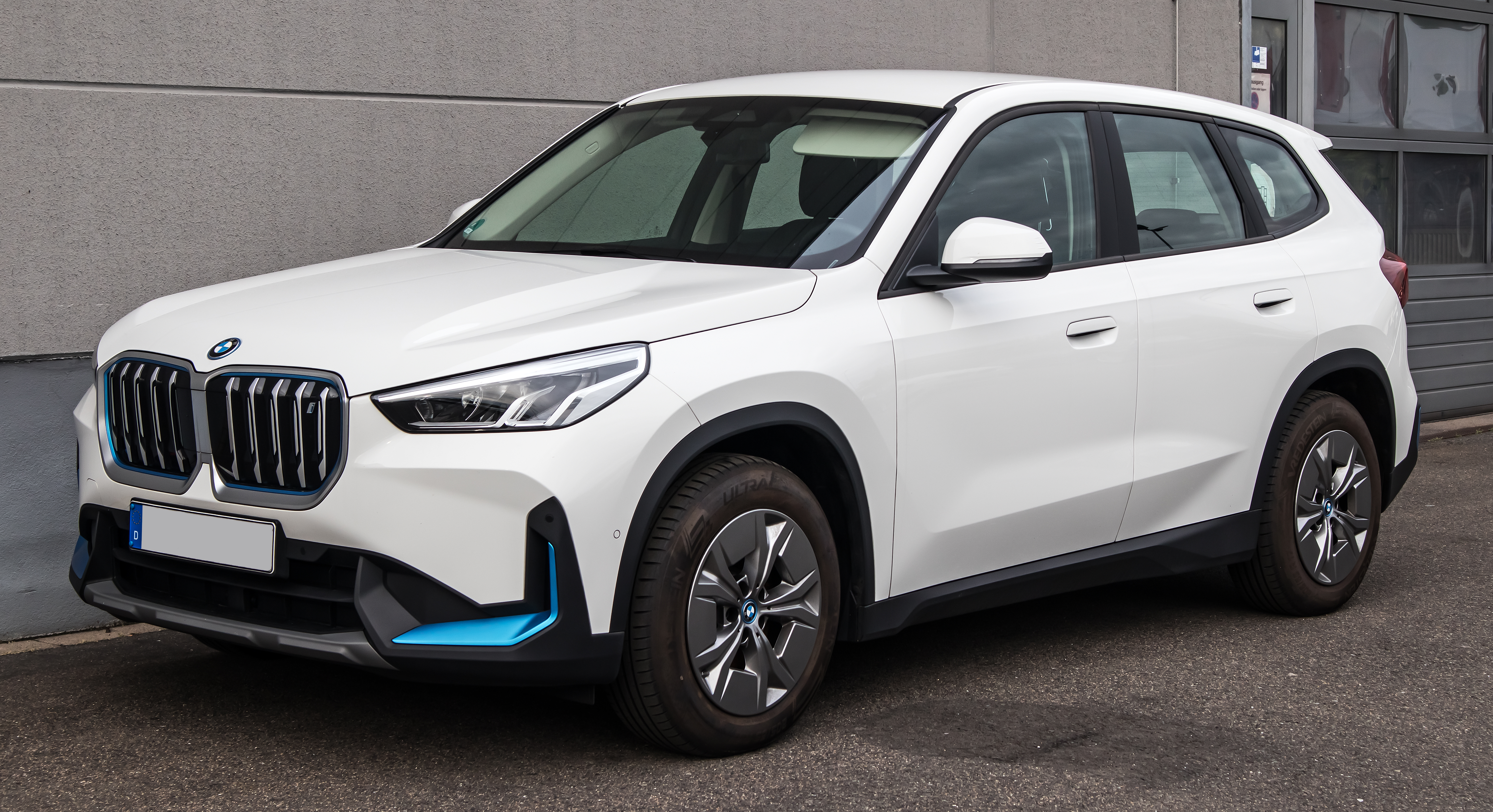
BMW iX1 xDrive30

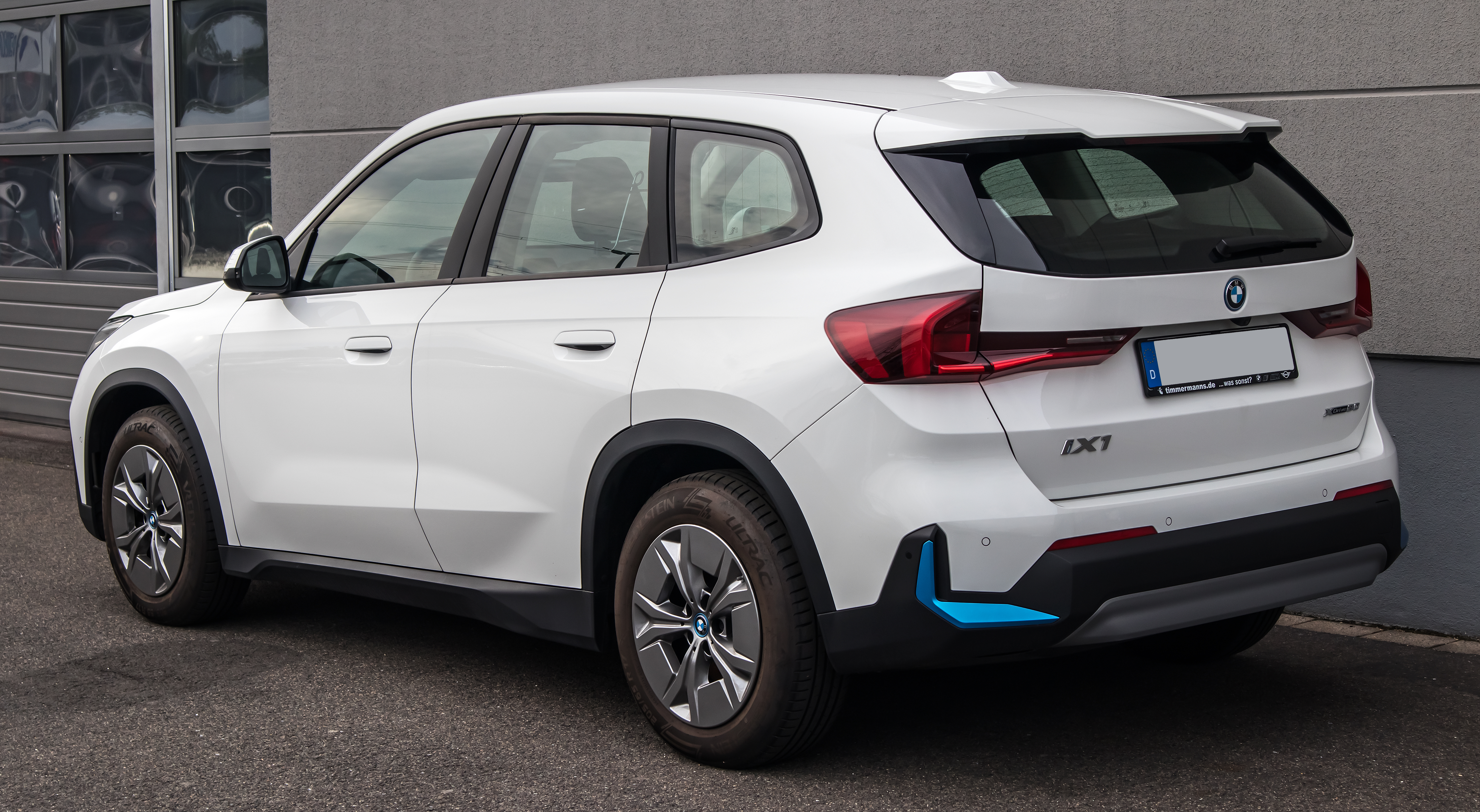
Rear view

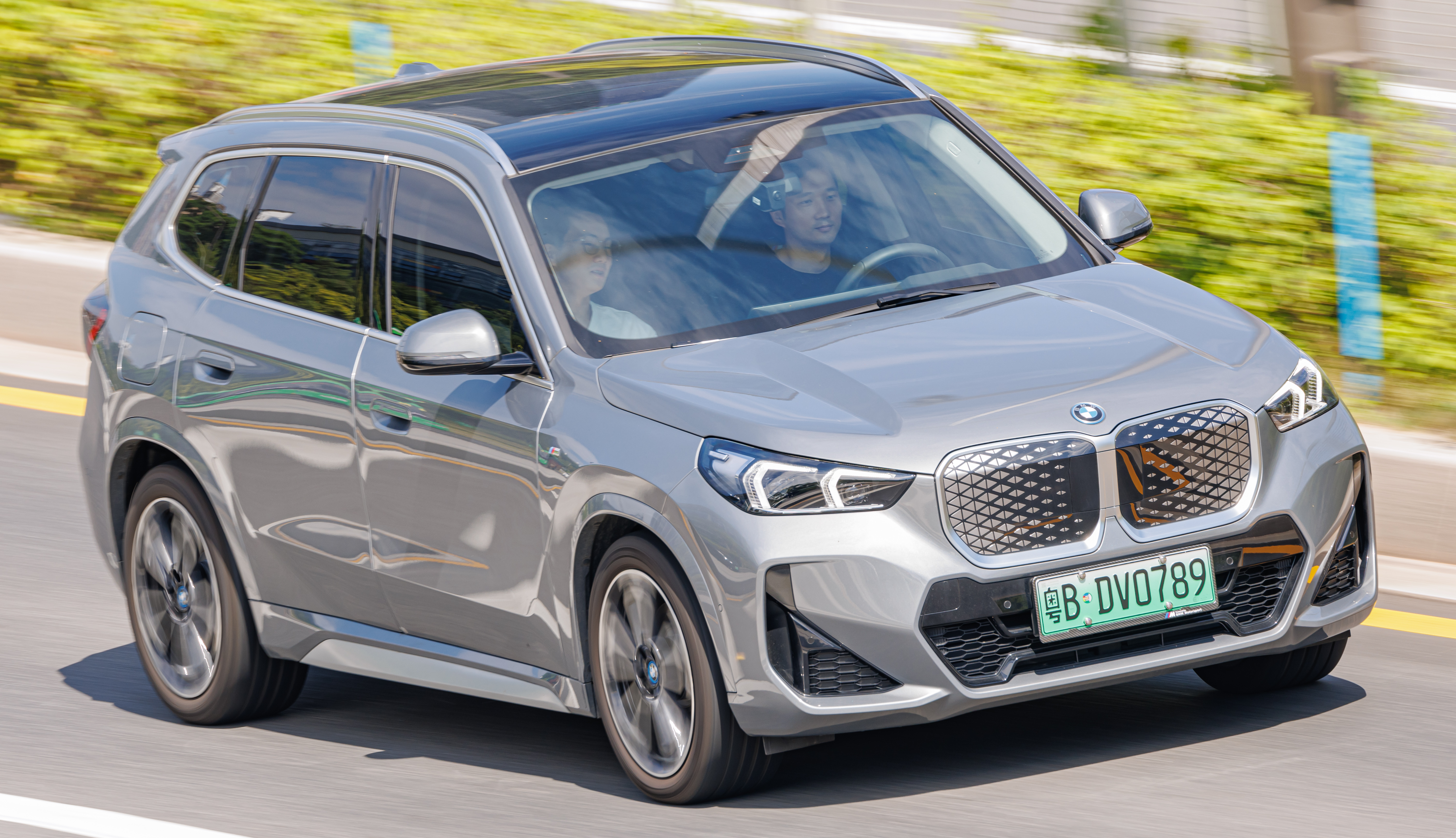
BMW ix1 eDrive20

iX1
Type	Model	Electric motor	Electric motor code	Battery	Range	Power	Torque	Combined system output	Top speed	0–100 km/h (0–62 mph)	Trans.	Layout	Cal. years
Battery electric	eDrive20	1x BMW eDrive	N/A	64.7 kWh lithium-ion	430–475 km (267–295 mi)^{WLTP}	201 hp (150 kW; 204 PS)	247 N⋅m (25.2 kg⋅m; 182 lb⋅ft)	-	170 km/h (110 mph)	8.6 sec	Single-speed automatic	FWD	2023–present
Battery electric	xDrive30	2x BMW eDrive 5.0	M170SF (front); M170SR (rear)	64.7 kWh lithium-ion	417–440 km (259–273 mi)^{WLTP}	Front motor: 188 hp (140 kW; 191 PS) Rear motor: 188 hp (140 kW; 191 PS)	Front motor: 247 N⋅m (25.2 kg⋅m; 182 lb⋅ft) Rear motor: 247 N⋅m (25.2 kg⋅m; 182 lb⋅ft)	309 hp (230 kW; 313 PS) / 494 N⋅m (50.4 kg⋅m; 364 lb⋅ft)	180 km/h (110 mph)	5.6 sec	Single-speed automatic	AWD	2022–present

== Safety ==
ANCAP test results BMW X1 (2022, aligned with Euro NCAP)
Test	Points	%
Overall:	5 /5 stars	
Adult occupant:	32.77	86%
Child occupant:	43.30	88%
Pedestrian:	41.08	76%
Safety assist:	15.07	94%

ANCAP test results BMW iX1 (2022, aligned with Euro NCAP)
Test	Points	%
Overall:	5 /5 stars	
Adult occupant:	32.77	86%
Child occupant:	43.30	88%
Pedestrian:	41.08	76%
Safety assist:	15.07	94%

Euro NCAP test results BMW X1 X Line (2022)
Test	Points	%
Overall:	5 /5 stars	
Adult occupant:	32.8	86%
Child occupant:	43.9	89%
Pedestrian:	41.1	76%
Safety assist:	14.8	92%
