= BMW B47 =

Inline-four common rail diesel engine

BMW B47 engine
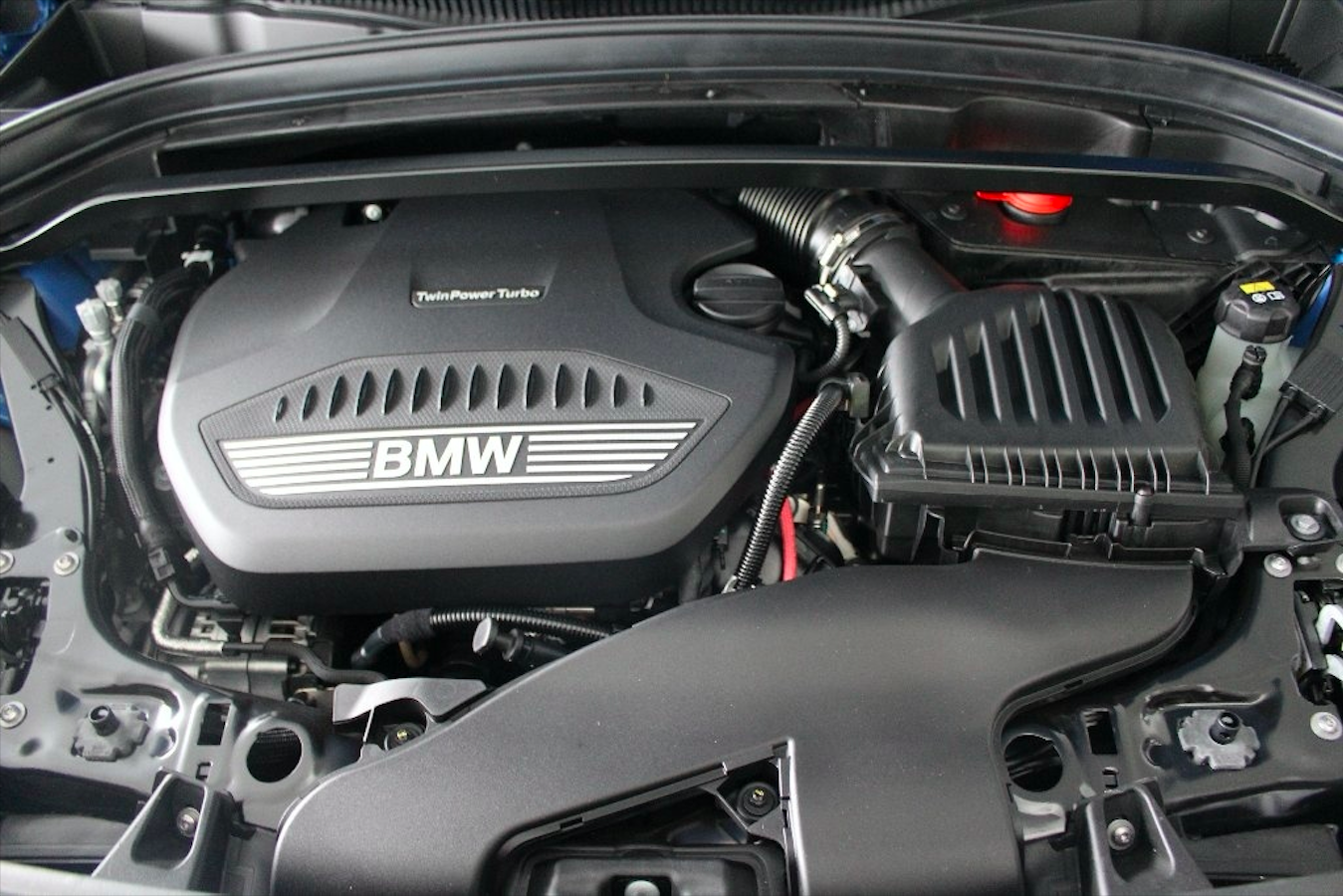
- B47C20

Overview
- Manufacturer: BMW
- Production: 2014–present

Layout
- Configuration: Inline-4
- Displacement: 2.0 L (1,995 cc)
- Cylinder bore: 84 mm (3.31 in)
- Piston stroke: 90 mm (3.54 in)
- Cylinder block material: Aluminium alloy
- Cylinder head material: Aluminium alloy
- Valvetrain: DOHC 4 valves x cyl.
- Compression ratio: 16.5:1

Combustion
- Turbocharger: Single or twin-turbo
- Fuel system: Common rail direct injection
- Fuel type: Diesel fuel (DIN EN 590)
- Cooling system: Water-cooled

Output
- Power output: 85–170 kW (114–228 hp)
- Torque output: 270–500 N⋅m (199–369 lb⋅ft)

Emissions
- Emissions target standard: Euro 6
- Emissions control systems: AdBlue injection

Chronology
- Predecessor: BMW N47

The BMW B47 is a four-cylinder common rail diesel engine produced by BMW. It debuted in 2014 as the successor to the previous N47 engine. While the B47D models are used in rear-wheel drive cars, the B47C variants are used with front-wheel drive.

== Design ==
The B47 engine is part of the modular family of engines, along with the B38, B48, B57 and B58. The B47 complies with the Euro 6 emissions standard, and features a dual overhead camshaft with 4 valves per cylinder and a single turbocharger; while 165 kW (221 hp) and 170 kW (228 hp) engines feature twin-turbochargers. In November 2017, a technical update (codenamed B47TÜ1) added AdBlue injection and higher injection pressures. Twin turbo for both 318d and 320d.

== Models ==
Engine	Power	Torque	Years
B47C20; B47D20	85 kW (114 hp) at 4,000 rpm	270 N⋅m (199 lb⋅ft) at 1,250–2,750 rpm	2015–
B47C20; B47D20	110 kW (148 hp) at 4,000 rpm	320 N⋅m (236 lb⋅ft) at 1,500–3,000 rpm	2015–
B47C20; B47D20	110 kW (148 hp) at 4,000 rpm	330 N⋅m (243 lb⋅ft) at 1,750–2,250 rpm	2014–
B47C20; B47D20	110 kW (148 hp) at 4,000 rpm	350 N⋅m (258 lb⋅ft) at 1,500–3,000 rpm	2014–
B47C20; B47D20	110 kW (148 hp) at 4,000 rpm	360 N⋅m (266 lb⋅ft) at 1,500–2,500 rpm	2014–
B47C20; B47D20	125 kW (168 hp) at 4,000 rpm	360 N⋅m (266 lb⋅ft) at 1,500–2,750 rpm	2014–
B47C20; B47D20	140 kW (188 hp) at 4,000 rpm	400 N⋅m (295 lb⋅ft) at 1,750–2,500 rpm	2014–
B47C20; B47D20	151 kW (202 hp) at 4,000 rpm	430 N⋅m (317 lb⋅ft) at 1,750–3,000 rpm	2014–
B47C20; B47D20	165 kW (221 hp) at 4,400 rpm	450 N⋅m (332 lb⋅ft) at 1,500–3,000 rpm	2015–
B47C20; B47D20	170 kW (228 hp) at 4,400 rpm	450 N⋅m (332 lb⋅ft) at 1,500–3,000 rpm	2015–
B47C20; B47D20	170 kW (228 hp) at 4,400 rpm	500 N⋅m (369 lb⋅ft) at 1,500–3,000 rpm	2015–

=== B47D20 (85 kW version) ===
- 2015–2019 F30/F31 316d

=== B47C/D20 (110 kW version) ===
- 2014–2016 F10 518d
- 2014–2021 F45 218d Active Tourer
- 2014–2021 F46 218d Gran Tourer
- 2015–2019 F20 118d
- 2015–2021 F22 218d
- 2015–2017 F25 X3 sDrive18d
- 2015–2019 F30/F31/F34 318d
- 2015–2020 F32/F36 418d
- 2015–2022 F48 X1 sDrive18d
- 2015–2024 F54 MINI Cooper D Clubman
- 2017–2023 F39 X2 sDrive18d
- 2017–present F60 MINI Cooper D Countryman
- 2017–2023 G30 518d
- 2017–present G20 318d
- 2019–2024 F40 118d
- 2022–present U11 sDrive18d
- 2025–present F70 118d

=== B47C/D20 (120 kW version) ===
- 2015–2024 F56 MINI Cooper SD
- 2015–2018 F30 320d EfficientDynamics Edition

=== B47C/D20 (140 kW version) ===
- 2014–2016 F10/F11 520d
- 2014–present F26 X4 xDrive20d
- 2014–present F45 220d Active Tourer
- 2014–present F46 220d Gran Tourer
- 2015–2019 F20 120d/120d xDrive
- 2015–present F22/F23 220d
- 2014–2017 F25 X3 sDrive20d/xDrive20d
- 2015–2019 F30/F31/F34 320d
- 2015–present F32/F36 420d
- 2015–present F48 X1 sDrive20d
- 2015–present F54 MINI Cooper SD Clubman
- 2016–present G30/G31 520d
- 2017–present F39 X2 xDrive20d
- 2017–present F60 MINI Cooper SD Countryman
- 2017–present G01 X3 xDrive20d
- 2018–present G02 X4 xDrive20d
- 2018–present G32 620d Gran Turismo
- 2019–present G20 320d
- 2019–present F40 120d xDrive
- 2019–current F44 220d Gran Coupé
- 2021–present G42 220d

=== B47C/D20 (165 kW version) ===
- 2015–2019 F20 125d
- 2015–2019 F22 225d
- 2015–2018 F30/F31/F34 325d
- 2016–2020 F32/F33/F36 425d

=== B47C/D20 (170 kW version) ===
- 2018–present G05 X5 xDrive25d
- 2015–2018 F15 X5 sDrive25d/xDrive25d
- 2016–2022 F48 X1 xDrive25d
- 2017–2019 G30/G31 525d
- 2018–2022 F39 X2 xDrive25d
- 2016–2019 G11 725d/725Ld
