= Prince engine =

PSA Prince engine
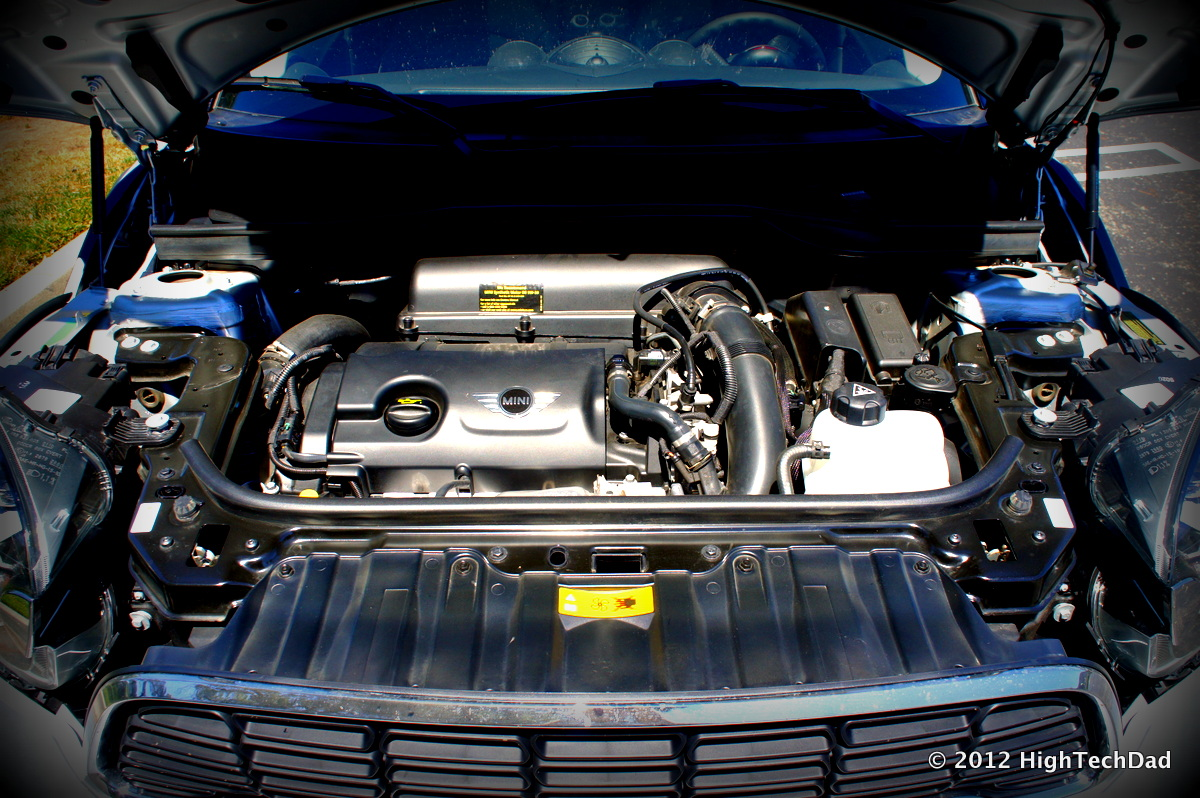

Overview
- Manufacturer: BMW and PSA Peugeot Citroën
- Production: 2006–present

Layout
- Configuration: Inline-4
- Displacement: 1.4 L (1,397 cc); 1.6 L (1,598 cc)
- Cylinder bore: 77 mm (3.0 in)
- Piston stroke: 75 mm (2.95 in); 85.8 mm (3.38 in)
- Cylinder block material: Aluminium
- Cylinder head material: Aluminium
- Valvetrain: DOHC, with VVT & VVL

Combustion
- Turbocharger: In some versions
- Fuel type: Gasoline

Chronology
- Predecessor: Tritec engine PSA TU engine PSA EW engine BMW N43

Prince is the codename for a family of straight-four 16-valve all-aluminium gasoline engines with variable valve lift and variable valve timing developed by BMW and PSA Peugeot Citroën. It is a compact engine family of 1.4–1.6 L in displacement and includes most modern features such as gasoline direct injection and turbocharger.

The BMW versions of the Prince engine are known as the N13 and the Mini versions are N12 (Double VANOS, Valvetronic 88 kW (118 hp) at 6000 rpm) in 2007–2010 Cooper; N14 (Single VANOS, Turbocharged 128 kW (171 hp) at 5500 rpm) in 2007–2010 Cooper-S; N14 (Single VANOS, Turbocharged 155 kW (208 hp) at 6000 rpm) in 2009–2013 JCW Cooper; N16 (Double VANOS, Valvetronic 90 kW (121 hp) at 6000 rpm) in 2011–2013 Cooper and N18 (Double VANOS, Valvetronic Turbocharged 135 kW (181 hp) at 5500 rpm) in 2011–2013 Cooper-S. It replaced the Tritec engine family in the Mini and was first introduced in 2006 for MINI. Later in 2011 also for BMW models F20 and F21 114i, 116i and 118i . This was the first longitudinal engine mount option for Prince engine.

PSA started to use the Prince family in 2006 to replace a part of their TU family (the other part being replaced by the EB engine) — the Peugeot 207 being the first car to receive it.

The engine's components are produced by PSA at their Douvrin, France, facility, with MINI and BMW engine assembly at Hams Hall in Warwickshire, UK. The co-operation was announced on 23 July 2002 with the first engines produced in 2006. The Prince engine project is not related to the Prince Motor Company.

In late 2006, an extension of the cooperation between the two groups was announced, promising new four-cylinder engines, without further details.

On 29 September 2010, it was announced by BMW that the turbocharged 1.6-litre version of the Prince engine would be supplied from 2012 to Saab for use in forthcoming models, primarily the 9-3. However, with the closure of SAAB, supply never started.

At the Geneva Auto Show 2011, Saab unveiled their last concept vehicle: the Saab PhoeniX was fitted with the 1.6-litre, turbocharged BMW Prince engine with 147 kW (200 PS).

On 25 June 2014 1.6-litre turbo Prince engine won its eighth consecutive International Engine of the Year Award in the 1.4 to 1.8-litre category. In 2014 the Prince engine beat, among others, the new BMW B38 engine which is replacing the Prince engine in the Mini and BMW lineups.

== Design ==
The Prince family shares its basic block dimensions with the previous PSA TU engine family. Engineering design was directed by BMW using their Valvetronic variable valve lift system on the intake side, flow-controlled oil pump, timing chain, single belt drive of all ancillary units, composite camshafts and cylinder head produced by lost-foam casting. It is also equipped with an on-demand water pump. Gasoline direct injection with a twin-scroll turbocharger will be used on the higher power versions.

All Prince engines will share 84 mm (3.31 in) cylinder bore spacing, with 77 mm (3.03 in) bore. The 1.6 litre engine has a stroke of 85.8 mm (3.38 in). The engine features a two-piece "bedplate" aluminium crankcase for extra stiffness.

== 1.4-litre EP3/EP3C (PSA) ==
The 1.4 L PSA EP3 and EP3C is the smallest member of the Prince family with a stroke measuring 75 mm (2.95 in) and total capacity of 1,397 cc (1.4 L). Depending on application, power output varies from 70 to 72 kW (95 to 98 PS) while torque varies from 137 to 140 N⋅m (101 to 103 lb⋅ft).

Applications:

- 2005–2014 Peugeot 207
- 2007–2010 Mini One
- 2007–2013 Peugeot 308 (308 CC until 2015)
- 2009–2013 Citroën C3
- 2009–2017 Citroën C3 Picasso
- 2009–2012 Citroën DS3
- 2012–2015 Peugeot 208

== 1.6-litre EP6/EP6C naturally aspirated (PSA) ==
The 1.6 L engine is used in the second-generation MINI and various Peugeot 207 models. It has an 85.8 mm (3.38 in) stroke for a total of 1,598 cc (1.6 L) of displacement.

The naturally aspirated variant (EP6, EP6C) has conventional fuel injection and lost-foam cast cylinder heads. Its 11:1 compression ratio creates an output of 88 kW (120 PS) at 6000 rpm with a redline of 6500 rpm. Torque is 160 N⋅m (118 lb⋅ft) at 4250 rpm.

Applications:

- 2007–2012 Peugeot 207 Sport
- 2007–2015 Mini Cooper
- 2007–2014 Mini One
- 2012–2015 Peugeot 208
- 2013–2015 Peugeot 2008
- 2007–2013 Peugeot 308 (308 CC until 2015)
- 2010–2015 Peugeot 3008
- 2011–2015 Peugeot 508
- 2008–2014 Citroën C4
- 2009–2016 DS 3
- 2009–2015 DS 4
- 2009–2014 Citroën C3
- 2009–2017 Citroën C3 Picasso

== 1.6-litre turbocharged (PSA) ==
The turbocharged 1.6 L unit adds gasoline direct injection and has special low-pressure die-cast heads. It has an 85.8 mm (3.38 in) stroke for a total of 1,598 cc (1.6 L) of displacement.

At first, there were two versions on offer – the THP150 and THP175, also known as the EP6DT and EP6DTS respectively within Peugeot. The first was later updated as EP6CDT and also as THP163, EP6CDTM. There is also EP6CDT MD – with lowered compression ratio.

For the THP150 maximum torque is 240 N⋅m (177 lb⋅ft) at 1400 rpm. Power output is 110 kW (150 PS) at 5500 rpm.

Applications:

- 2006–2014 Peugeot 207 CC/GT
- 2007–present Peugeot 308
- 2011–present Peugeot 508
- 2010–2015 Peugeot RCZ (THP156)
- 2008–2018 Citroën C4
- 2008–2022 Citroën C4 Picasso
- 2008–2022 Citroën Grand C4 Picasso
- 2013–2022 Citroën C4 Sedan
- 2009–2019 DS 3
- 2010–2018 DS 4
- 2012–2018 DS 5
- 2011–present Peugeot 408 Sport
- 2012–2020 Peugeot 208

For the THP163 maximum torque is 240 N⋅m (177 lb⋅ft) at 1400 rpm. Power output is 121 kW (165 PS) at 5500 rpm.

Applications:

- 2011–present Peugeot 408
- 2015–present Citroën C4 Grand Picasso
- 2016–present Peugeot 3008
- 2017–present Peugeot 5008
- 2018–present Citroën C4 Cactus (for Argentina, Brazil and some Latin American markets)
- 2017–2023 Dongfeng Aeolus AX7

For the THP175 (EP6DTS, later EP6CDTS) maximum torque is 247 N⋅m (182 lb⋅ft) at 1600 rpm, remaining flat to 5000 rpm. Power output is 129 kW (175 PS) at 5500 rpm. An overboost function is available which temporarily increases torque to 260 N⋅m (192 lb⋅ft) between 1700 rpm and 4500 rpm in gears 3 to 5.

Applications:

- 2006–2010 Peugeot 207 RC
- 2007–2010 Mini Cooper S
- 2007–2011 Mini John Cooper Works (211 PS (155 kW) – only used by BMW)
- 2008–present Peugeot 308
- 2010–2019 Citroën DS3 Racing – EP6CDTS – 202 hp

In 2010 Peugeot released the 1.6 THP engine (EP6CDXD) with 200 PS (147 kW) at 5500 rpm, maximum torque 275 N⋅m (203 lb⋅ft) at 1700 rpm. It featured direct injection, twin-scroll turbocharger and Valvetronic variable valve lift. It was first introduced in the Peugeot RCZ sport compact for the 2010 model year, where it generates 150 kW (204 PS).

Applications:

- 2010–2015 Peugeot RCZ
- 2010–2013 Peugeot 308 GTi
- 2010–2018 DS 4
- 2012–2019 Peugeot 208 GTi
- 2021–present Peugeot 3008 GT Hybrid4, 221 kW (300 PS)

The 2012–2014 Mini John Cooper Works GP featured additional performance, with 160 kW (218 PS) at 6000 rpm and 280 N⋅m (207 lb⋅ft) of torque at 2000–5100 rpm from a larger turbo and engine internals.

PSA has now released a new Euro 6 engine based on the THP in the following Engine codes:

- EP6FADTXD – 132 kW (180 PS) Peugeot 508 Puretech 180, Peugeot 3008 Puretech 180, DS 7 Crossback Puretech 180, Citroën C5 Aircross PureTech 180, Opel Grandland
- EP6FDTX – 151 kW (205 PS)/153 kW (208 PS)/154 kW (210 PS) 1.6 THP Peugeot 208 GTi
- EP6FADTX – 165 kW (225 PS) Peugeot 508 Puretech 225, Peugeot 3008 Hybrid4 225, DS 7 Crossback PureTech 225, Secma F16 Turbo
- EP6FDTR – 184 kW (250 PS)/199 kW (270 PS) 1.6 THP Peugeot 308 GTi
- EP6CDTR – 199 kW (270 PS) 1.6 THP Peugeot RCZ

In 2024, Stellantis unveiled the third generation of this engine (EP6LTCHPD) with 150 hp (110 kW) at 5500 rpm and 300 N⋅m at 2000 rpm. This variant is paired with a seven-speed dual-clutch automatic transmission (trade name e-DCS7) with an integrated 92kW electric motor, for a combined total of 195hp and 350 N⋅m.

Applications:

- 2024-present Peugeot 3008 III plug-in hybrid
- 2024-present Peugeot 5008 III plug-in hybrid
- 2024-present Opel Grandland II plug-in hybrid
- 2025-present Citroën C5 Aircross II plug-in hybrid
- 2025-present Jeep Compass III e-Hybrid plug-in

In 2025, Stellantis unveiled the North American version known internally as the EP6CDTX for use in STLA Medium and STLA Large vehicles in conventional non plugin hybrid setups, for the North American market. It has a power output of 210hp and 230lb torque.

Applications:

- 2026-present Jeep Cherokee (KM)
- 2027- Chrysler C6X crossover
- 2028- Jeep Compass III (North America)

== BMW N13 version ==
The turbocharged 1.6 litre version used by BMW is called the BMW N13. The N13 replaced the naturally aspirated BMW N43 engine and was produced from 2011 to 2016. It is BMW's first turbocharged four-cylinder petrol engine since the BMW 2002 Turbo ceased production in 1974.

BMW sold the N13 alongside the larger displacement BMW N20 turbocharged four-cylinder engine. The N13 was effectively replaced by the turbocharged three-cylinder BMW B38 engine.

| Model | Displacement | Power | Torque | Years |
|---|---|---|---|---|
| N13B16 | 1,598 cc (97.5 cu in) | 136 PS (100 kW) at 4,350 rpm | 220 N⋅m (162 lb⋅ft) at 1,350 rpm | 2011–2015 |
| N13B16 | 1,598 cc (97.5 cu in) | 170 PS (125 kW) at 4,800 rpm | 250 N⋅m (184 lb⋅ft) at 1,500 rpm | 2012–2015 |

Applications:

75 kW version

- 2012–2015 BMW 1 Series (F20) 114i

100 kW version

- 2011–2015 BMW 1 Series (F20) 116i
- 2012–2015 BMW 3 Series (F30) 316i

125 kW version

- 2011–2015 BMW 1 Series (F20) 118i
- 2012–2015 BMW 3 Series (F30) 320i ED

130 kW version

- 2015–2016 BMW 1 Series (F20) 120i

== Mini N14 and N18 versions ==
The turbocharged 1.6 litre versions used by Mini are called the Mini N14 and Mini N18. The N18 succeeded the N14 starting from 2010 and had double Vanos. The N14/N18 engine uses direct injection, a twin-scroll turbocharger and Valvetronic (variable valve lift).

== Issues ==
There have been several cases of recalls and/or extended warranty due to failing HPFP (high pressure fuel pumps) in the Prince engine.

There was a service bulletin issued in 2013 due to failing timing chains and timing chain tensioner, both designed by BMW, in the Prince engine.

== Production ==
The production of MINI version of 'Prince' family of engines is set to end by 2016 and be replaced by a new 3 and 4 cylinder Engine family – BMW B37, BMW B38 and BMW B48.

In 2015 it was announced, on the Hong Kong Stock Exchange, that BMW had signed an IPR deal with XCE. They will make the N18 TVDI engine in China for use in various Brilliance Automotive vehicles (JV Partner of BMW in China) and also for other China OEMs.

PSA will continue to develop the higher power models of the engine family, with future production planned for China with its JV partners Dongfeng (DPCA) and Changan (CAPSA).

From 2025, the engine will be produced in the Dundee plant, in a new hybridised version that will first be used by the new Jeep Cherokee.

== Bibliography ==
- "Press Kit" (PDF). PSA Peugeot Citroën. Archived from the original (PDF) on March 11, 2006.
