= BMW 1 Series (F20) =

Second generation of BMW 1 Series

BMW 1 Series (Second generation)
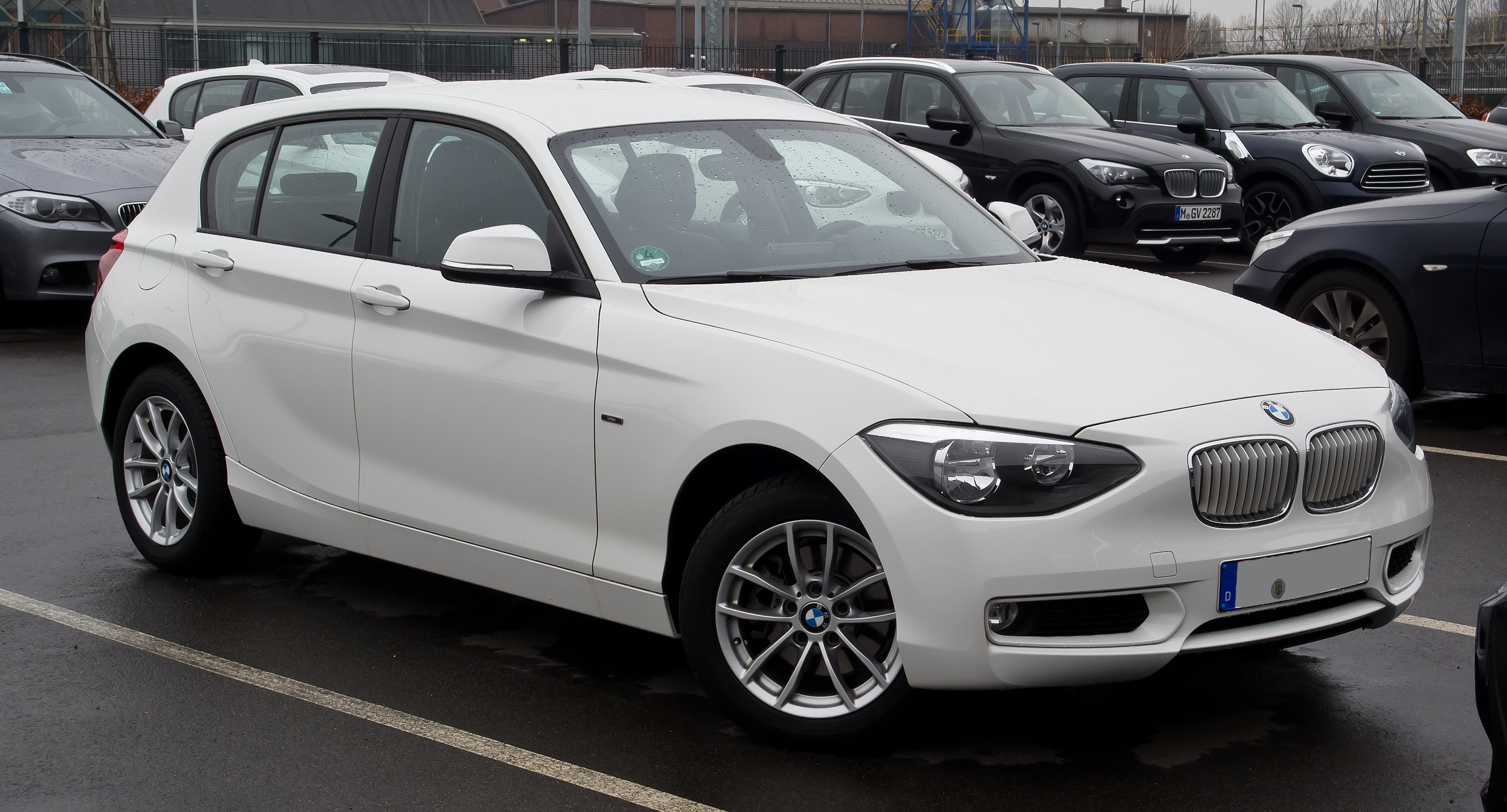

Overview
- Manufacturer: BMW
- Model code: F20 (5-door hatchback); F21 (3-door hatchback)
- Production: September 2011 – May 2019
- Model years: 2012–2019
- Assembly: Germany: Leipzig (BMW Leipzig Plant); Regensburg; Brazil: Araquari; India: Chennai (BMW India); Thailand: Rayong (BMW Thailand); Malaysia: Kulim, Kedah (Inokom)
- Designer: Nicolas Huet; Calvin Luk (facelift)

Body and chassis
- Class: Subcompact executive car (C)
- Body style: 3-door hatchback 5-door hatchback
- Layout: Front-engine, rear-wheel-drive; Front-engine, all-wheel-drive (xDrive)
- Platform: BMW L7
- Related: BMW 3 Series (F30); BMW 4 Series (F32); BMW 2 Series (F22)

Powertrain
- Engine: Petrol: 1.5 L B38 I3; 1.6-2.0 L N13/N20/B48 I4; 3.0 L N55/B58 I6; Diesel: 1.5 L B37 I3; 1.6-2.0 L N47/B47 I4
- Transmission: 6-speed manual; 8-speed ZF 8HP 45 transmission automatic

Dimensions
- Wheelbase: 2,690 mm (105.9 in)
- Length: 4,324 mm (170.2 in)
- Width: 1,765 mm (69.5 in)
- Height: 1,421 mm (55.9 in)
- Curb weight: 1,360–1,590 kg (3,000–3,510 lb)

Chronology
- Predecessor: BMW 1 Series (E87)
- Successor: BMW 1 Series (F40)

The second generation of the BMW 1 Series consists of the BMW F20 (5-door hatchback) and BMW F21 (3-door hatchback) subcompact cars. The F20/F21 generation was produced by BMW from 2011 to 2019 and is often collectively referred to as the F20.

For the second generation of 1 Series, the coupé and convertible models marketed separately using the new BMW 2 Series nameplate.

The F20/F21 was initially powered by inline-four petrol, inline-four diesel and inline-six petrol engines. In 2015, inline-three petrol and diesel engines were added to the model range. All engines are turbocharged.

Unlike most hatchback competitors, the F20/F21 uses a rear-wheel drive (rather than front-wheel drive) for most models. The F20/F21 is the first 1 Series to offer an optional all-wheel drive (called "xDrive" by BMW).

In July 2019, the BMW 1 Series (F40) began production as the successor to the F20.

== Equipment ==
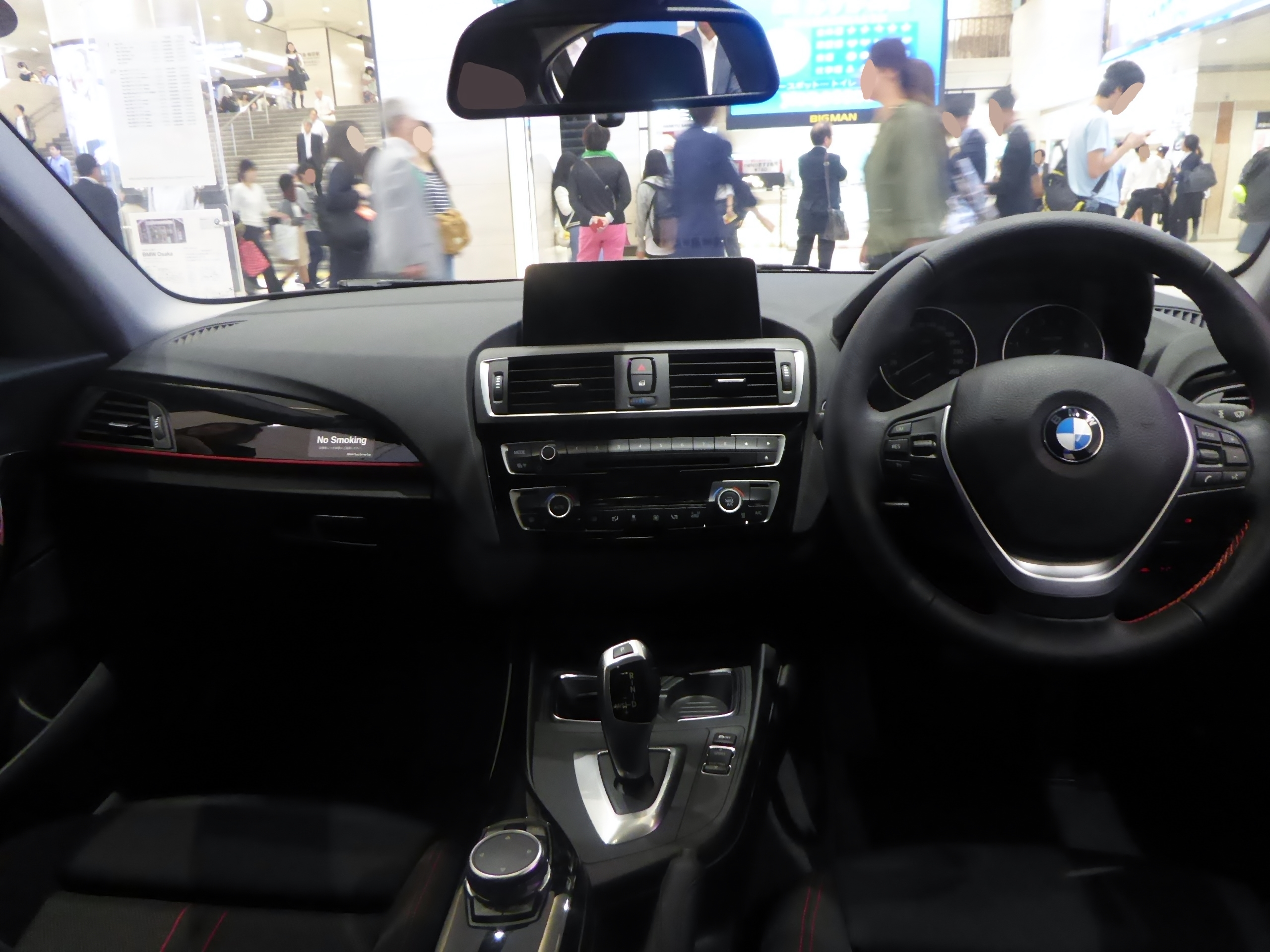
Interior

Available equipment includes satellite navigation with an 8.8-inch screen, iDrive, LED headlights and digital radio.

The interior and exterior trim is either Sport Line, Urban Line or M Sport. These trim packages differ by alloy wheels, kidney grille, FDS, and other appearance-related features.

In November 2015, the optional Automatic parking (called "Parking Assistant", where the car steers itself to parallel park) was upgraded.

114-125 models with the M Sport trim and M Performance models can be fitted with M Performance Parts. These include black kidney grilles, sport brakes for 18 inch and higher wheels, side skirt ground effects, carbon fibre mirrors and an M Performance silencer system for the M135i and M140i.

== Body styles ==
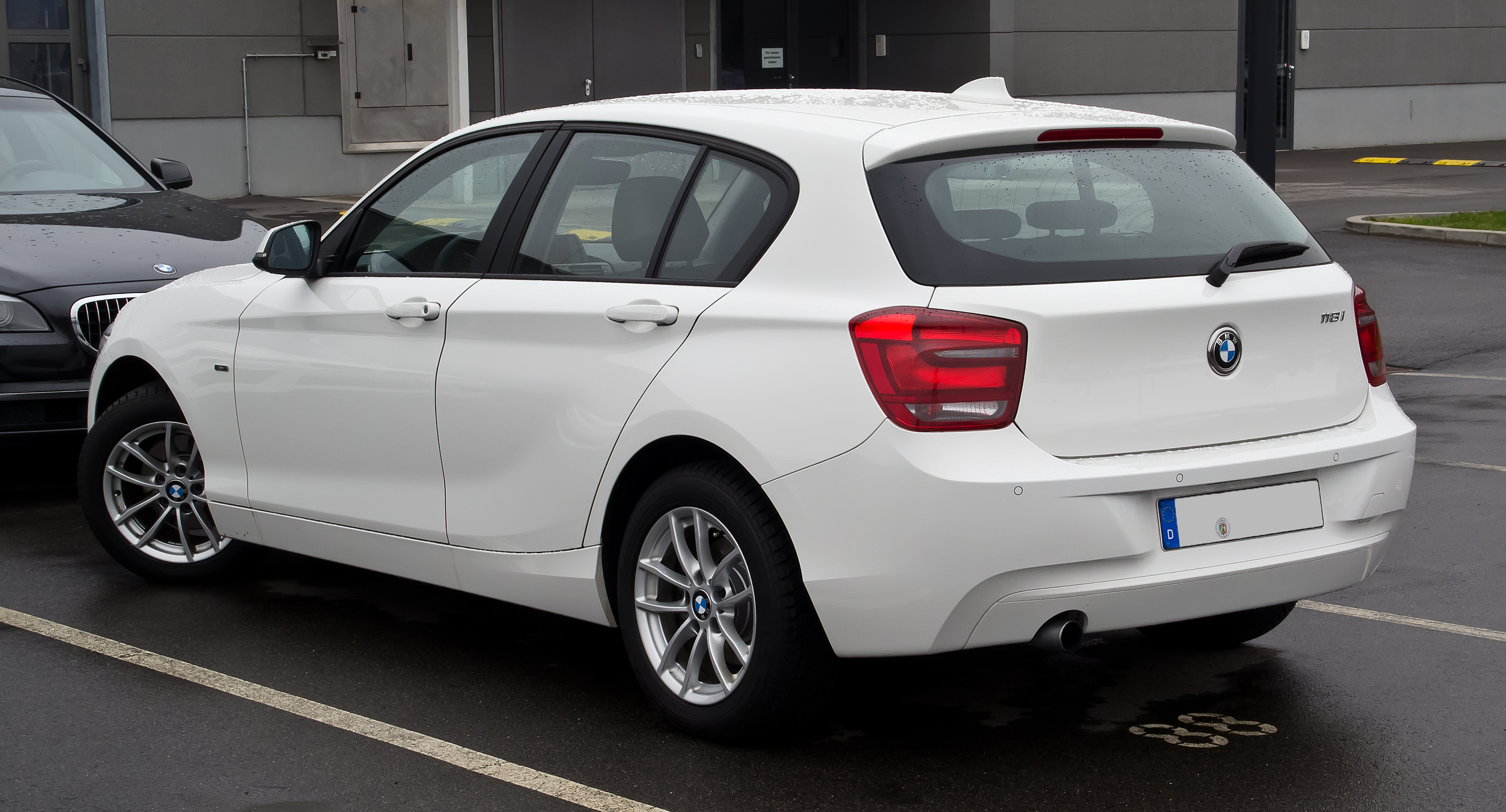
5-door hatchback

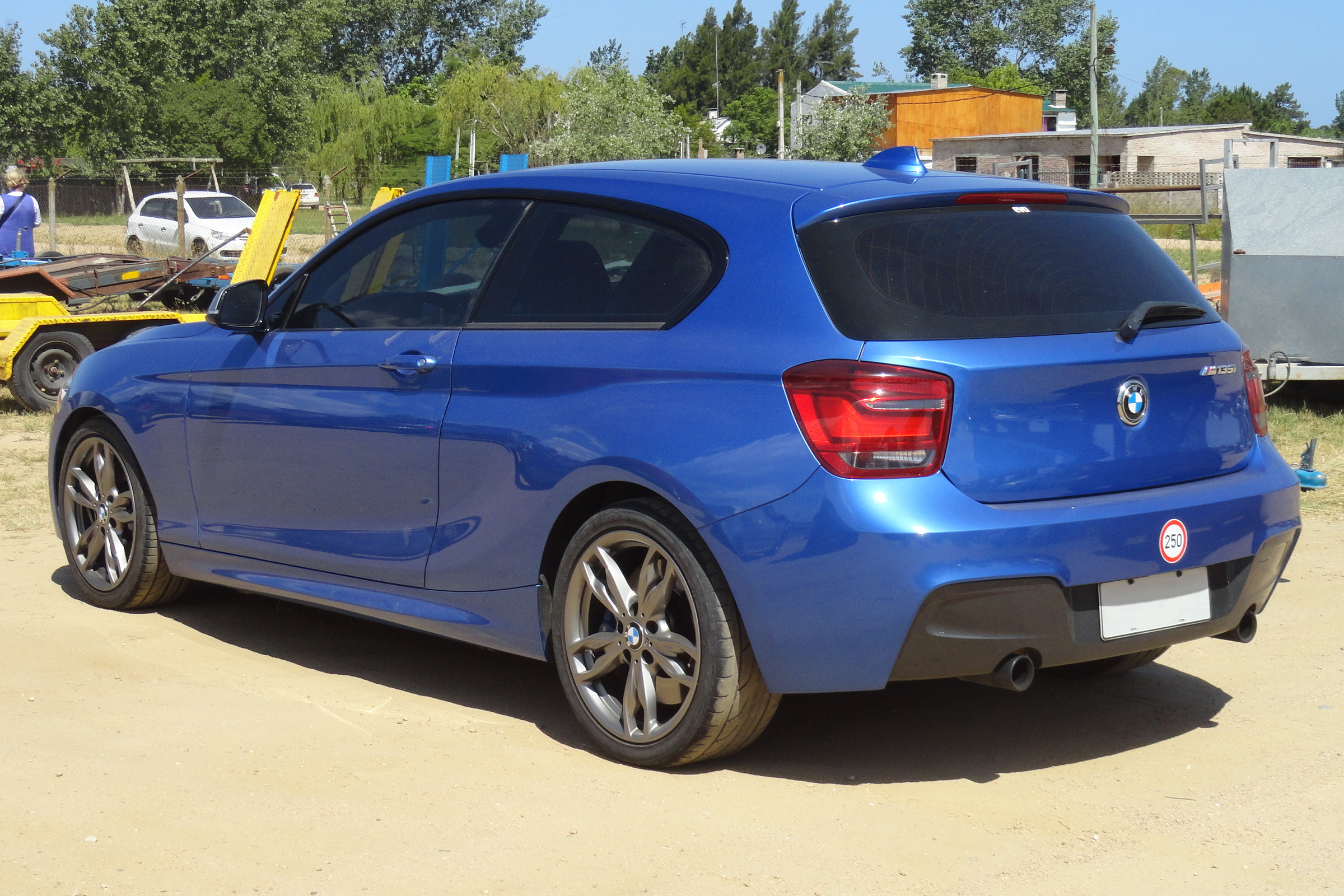
3-door hatchback

=== 5-door hatchback (F20) ===
The F20 five-door hatchback was the first of the F20/F21 body styles to be released. It was unveiled in 2011 at the Frankfurt Motor Show and then the Auto Guangzhou motor show.

Early models included the 116i, 118i, 116d, 118d, 120d. In 2012, the 125i, 125d and 116d EfficientDynamics Edition models were introduced. In July 2012, the 114i and M135i were introduced, followed by optional all-wheel drive (xDrive) for the 120d and M135i models. After the introduction of the facelift (LCI) models in 2015, the M140i replaced the M135i, which upgraded the engine to the BMW B58 and included various cosmetic changes.

=== 3-door hatchback (F21) ===
The vehicle was unveiled at the Auto Mobil International Leipzig 2012. The exterior styling was overseen by Nicolas Huet.

The launch models consisted of the petrol-engined 114i, 116i, 125i and M135i models, and the diesel-engined 114d, 116d, 116d EfficientDynamics Edition, 118d and 125d models. The inline-six M135i model was unveiled in the 3-door body style at the 2012 Geneva International Motor Show. From 2016, the M140i replaced the M135i, with same engine and options as F20.

== Engines ==
=== Petrol ===
Official specifications are as follows:

Model	Years	Engine- turbo	Power	Torque
114i	2012-2015	1.6 L N13 inline-4 with turbocharger	75 kW (102 PS) at 4,000 rpm	180 N⋅m (133 lb⋅ft) at 1,100-3,900 rpm
116i	2012-2015	1.6 L N13 inline-4 with turbocharger	100 kW (136 PS) at 4,400-6,450 rpm	220 N⋅m (162 lb⋅ft) at 1,350-4,300 rpm
116i	2015-2019	1.5 L B38 inline-3 with turbocharger	80 kW (109 PS) at 4,500-6,000 rpm	180 N⋅m (133 lb⋅ft) at 1,250-3,900 rpm
118i	2012-2015	1.6 L N13 inline-4 with turbocharger	125 kW (170 PS) at 4,800-6,450 rpm	250 N⋅m (184 lb⋅ft) at 1,500-4,500 rpm
118i	2015-2019	1.5 L B38 inline-3 with turbocharger	100 kW (136 PS) at 4,000-6,000 rpm	220 N⋅m (162 lb⋅ft) at 1,250-4,000 rpm
120i	2015-2016	1.6 L N13 inline-4 with turbocharger	130 kW (177 PS) at 4,800-6,450 rpm	250 N⋅m (184 lb⋅ft) at 1,350-4,500 rpm
120i	2016-2019	2.0 L B48 inline-4 with turbocharger	135 kW (184 PS) at 5,000 rpm	290 N⋅m (214 lb⋅ft) at 1,350-4,250 rpm
125i	2012-2015	2.0 L N20 inline-4 with turbocharger	160 kW (218 PS) at 5,000 rpm	310 N⋅m (229 lb⋅ft) at 1,350-4,800 rpm
125i	2016-2019	2.0 L B48 inline-4 with turbocharger	165 kW (224 PS) at 5,200 rpm	310 N⋅m (229 lb⋅ft) at 1,400-5,000 rpm
M135i	2012-2015	3.0 L N55 inline-6 with turbocharger	235 kW (320 PS) at 5,800-6,400 rpm	450 N⋅m (332 lb⋅ft) at 1,300-4,500 rpm
M135i	2015-2016	3.0 L N55 inline-6 with turbocharger	240 kW (326 PS) at 5,800-6,400 rpm	450 N⋅m (332 lb⋅ft) at 1,300-4,500 rpm
M140i	2016-2019	3.0 L B58 inline-6 with turbocharger	250 kW (340 PS) at 5,500 rpm	500 N⋅m (369 lb⋅ft) at 1,520-4,500 rpm

=== Diesel ===
Official specifications are as follows:

Model	Years	Engine displacement, code, arrangement, induction	Power	Torque	Top speed	0–100 km/h (0–62 mph)	Transmission
114d	2012-2015	1.6 L N47, inline-4 with turbocharger	70 kW (95 PS) at 4,000 rpm	235 N⋅m (173 lb⋅ft) at 1,500-2,750 rpm	185 km/h (115 mph)	12.2 sec	6-speed Getrag GS6-17DG manual transmission
114d	2015-2019	1.5 L B37, inline-3 with turbocharger	71 kW (97 PS) at 4,000 rpm	240 N⋅m (177 lb⋅ft) at 1,500-2,750 rpm	185 km/h (115 mph)	12.4 sec	6-speed Getrag GS6-17DG manual transmission
116d	2011-2015	2.0 L N47, inline-4 with turbocharger	85 kW (116 PS) at 4,000 rpm	260 N⋅m (192 lb⋅ft) at 1,750-2,500 rpm	200 km/h (124 mph)	10.3 sec	6-speed Getrag GS6-17DG manual transmission or 8-speed Friedrichshafen ZF 8HP45 automatic
116d	2012-2015	1.6 L N47, inline-4 with turbocharger	85 kW (116 PS) at 4,000 rpm	260 N⋅m (192 lb⋅ft) at 1,750-2,500 rpm	200 km/h (124 mph)	10.5 sec	6-speed Getrag GS6-17DG manual transmission or 8-speed Friedrichshafen ZF 8HP45 automatic
116d	2015-2019	1.5 L B37, inline-3 with turbocharger	85 kW (116 PS) at 4,000 rpm	270 N⋅m (199 lb⋅ft) at 1,750-2,250 rpm	200 km/h (124 mph)	10.7 sec	6-speed Getrag GS6-17DG manual transmission or 8-speed Friedrichshafen ZF 8HP45 automatic
116d EfficientDynamics Edition	2012-2015	1.6 L N47, inline-4 with turbocharger	85 kW (116 PS) at 4,000 rpm	260 N⋅m (192 lb⋅ft) at 1,750-2,500 rpm	195 km/h (121 mph)	10.5 sec	6-speed manual transmission
116d EfficientDynamics Edition	2015-2019	1.5 L B37, inline-3 with turbocharger	85 kW (116 PS) at 4,000 rpm	270 N⋅m (199 lb⋅ft) at 1,750-2,250 rpm	195 km/h (121 mph)	10.4 sec	6-speed manual transmission
118d	2011-2015	2.0 L N47, inline-4 with turbocharger	105 kW (143 PS) at 4,000 rpm	320 N⋅m (236 lb⋅ft) at 1,750-2,500 rpm	212 km/h (132 mph)	8.9 sec 8.6 sec (auto)	6-speed Getrag GS6-45DZ manual transmission or 8-speed Friedrichshafen ZF 8HP45 automatic
118d	2015-2019	2.0 L B47, inline-4 with turbocharger	110 kW (150 PS) at 4,000 rpm	320 N⋅m (236 lb⋅ft) at 1,500-3,000 rpm	212 km/h (132 mph)	8.3 sec 8.1 sec (auto)	6-speed Getrag GS6-45DZ manual transmission or 8-speed Friedrichshafen ZF 8HP45 automatic
118d xDrive	2013-2015	2.0 L B47, inline-4 with turbocharger	105 kW (143 PS) at 4,000 rpm	320 N⋅m (236 lb⋅ft) at 1,750-2,500 rpm	210 km/h (130 mph)	8.9 sec	6-speed manual transmission
118d xDrive	2015-2019	2.0 L B47, inline-4 with turbocharger	110 kW (150 PS) at 4,000 rpm	320 N⋅m (236 lb⋅ft) at 1,500-3,000 rpm	210 km/h (130 mph)	8.4 sec	6-speed manual transmission
120d	2011-2015	2.0 L N47, inline-4 with turbocharger	135 kW (184 PS) at 4,000 rpm	380 N⋅m (280 lb⋅ft) at 1,750-2,750 rpm	230 km/h (143 mph)	7.4 sec	6-speed Getrag GS6-45DZ manual transmission or 8-speed Friedrichshafen ZF 8HP45 automatic
120d	2015-2019	2.0 L B47, inline-4 with turbocharger	140 kW (190 PS) at 4,000 rpm	400 N⋅m (295 lb⋅ft) at 1,750-2,500 rpm	228 km/h (142 mph)	7.1 sec 7.0 sec (auto)	6-speed Getrag GS6-45DZ manual transmission or 8-speed Friedrichshafen ZF 8HP45 automatic
120d xDrive	2011-2015	2.0 L N47, inline-4 with turbocharger	135 kW (184 PS) at 4,000 rpm	380 N⋅m (280 lb⋅ft) at 1,750-2,750 rpm	225 km/h (140 mph)	7.2 sec	6-speed manual transmission
120d xDrive	2015-2019	2.0 L B47, inline-4 with turbocharger	140 kW (190 PS) at 4,000 rpm	400 N⋅m (295 lb⋅ft) at 1,750-2,500 rpm	222 km/h (138 mph)	6.8 sec	8-speed Friedrichshafen ZF 8HP45 automatic
125d	2012-2015	2.0 L N47, inline-4 with twin turbocharger	160 kW (218 PS) at 4,400 rpm	450 N⋅m (332 lb⋅ft) at 1,500-2,500 rpm	240 km/h (149 mph)	6.5 sec	6-speed Getrag GS6-45DZ manual transmission or 8-speed Friedrichshafen ZF 8HP45 automatic
125d	2015-2019	2.0 L B47, inline-4 with twin turbocharger	165 kW (224 PS) at 4,400 rpm	450 N⋅m (332 lb⋅ft) at 1,500-3,000 rpm	240 km/h (149 mph)	6.3 sec	8-speed Friedrichshafen ZF 8HP45 automatic

== Transmissions ==
Available transmission were:

- 6-speed manual (Getrag GS6-17 in most models, ZF GS6-45BZ in M135i/M140i)
- 8-speed ZF 8HP 45 or 50 transmission automatic.

== Suspension ==
Like its E87 predecessor, the F20/F21 uses aluminum multi-link suspension.

== Model year changes ==
=== 2015 facelift ===
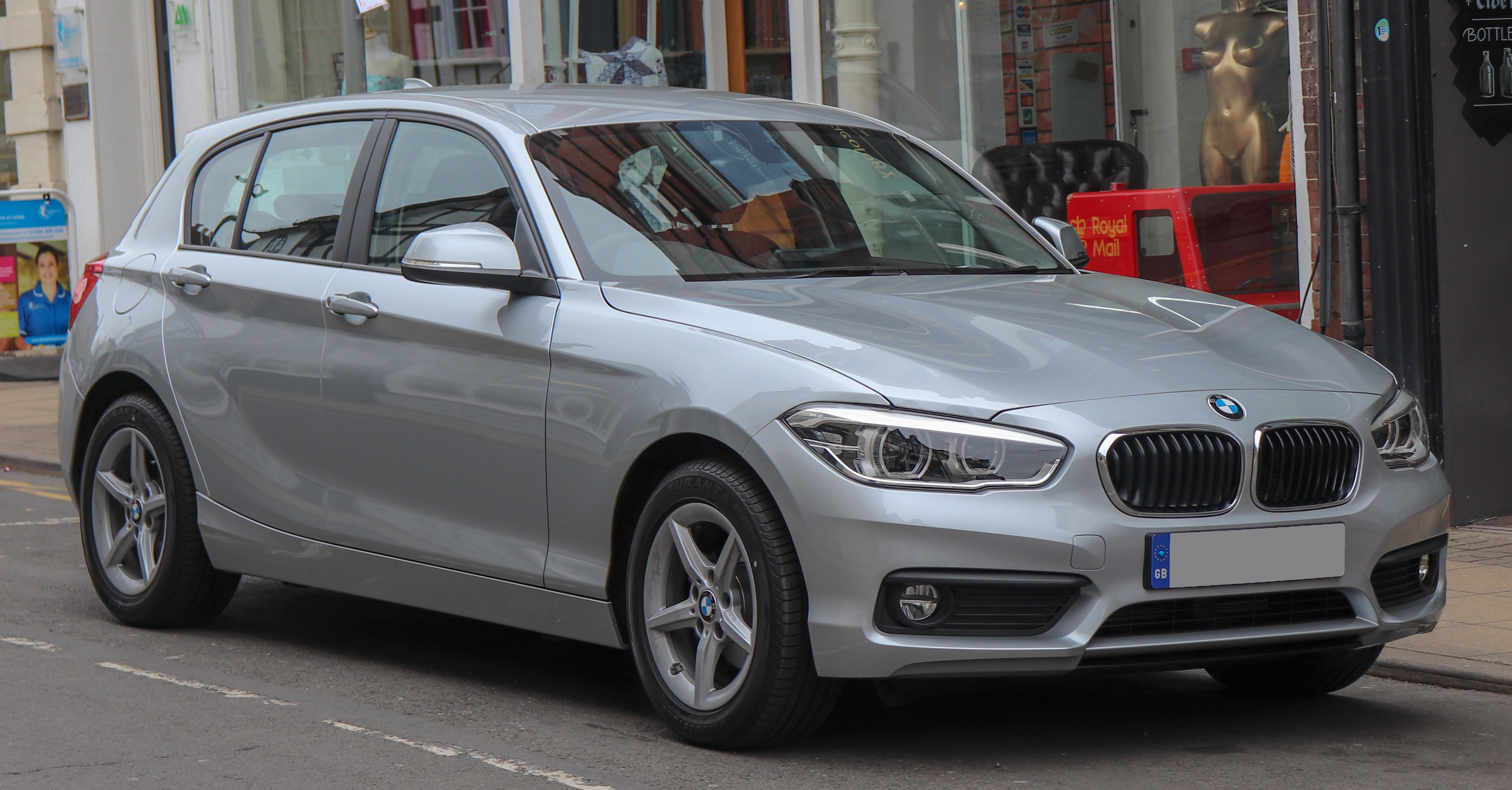

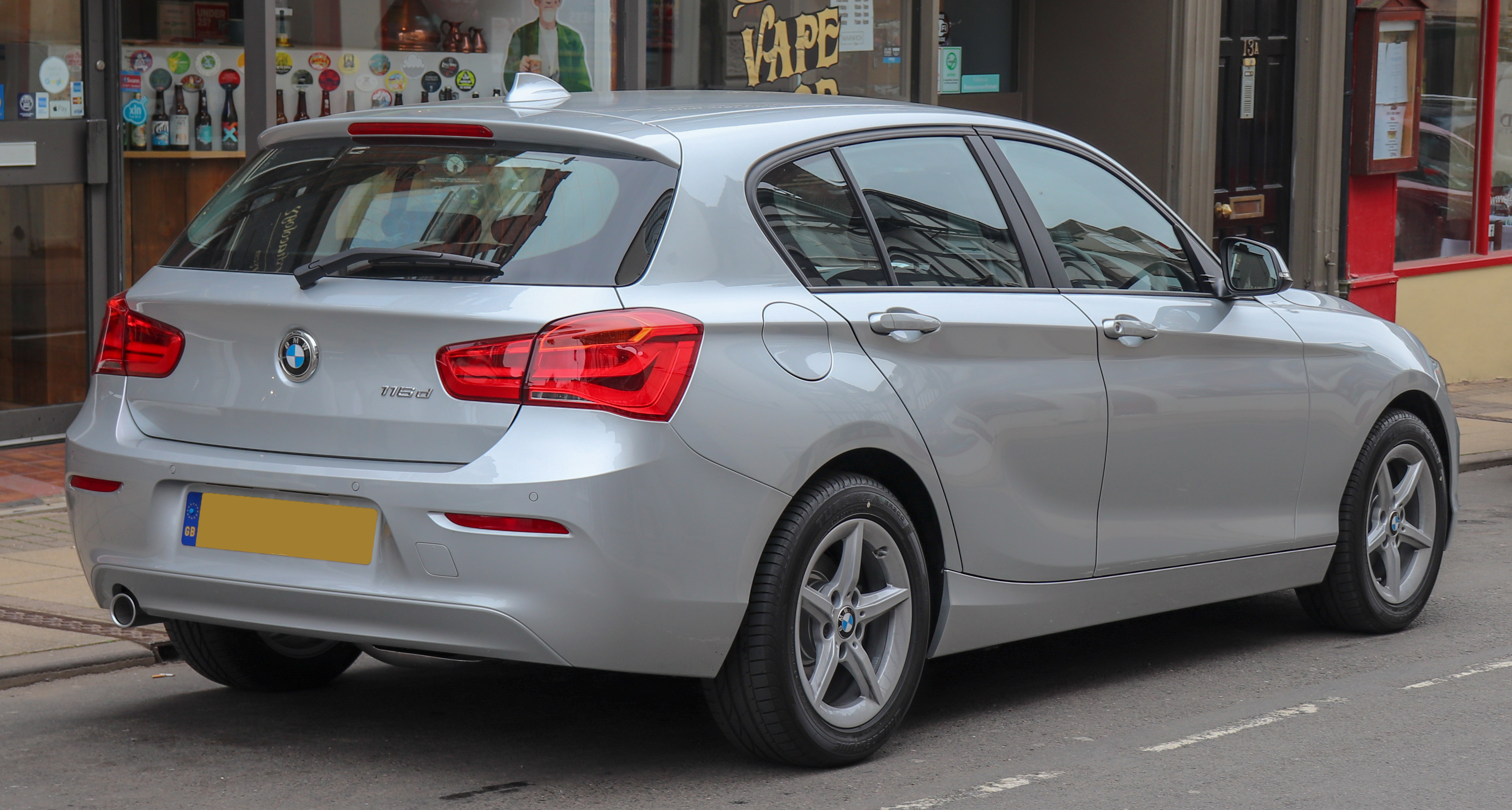
2015 facelift

The facelift ("LCI", "F20N") changes were unveiled at the 2015 Geneva International Motor Show on 5 March, and began production later that month. Changes included:

- Revised bumpers, tail-lights and LED directional headlights ("Adaptive Headlights")
- Diesel engines changed from 4-cylinder N47 to 3-cylinder BMW B37 (116d model) and 4-cylinder BMW B47 (118d, 120d and 125d models).
- 116i and 118i models changed from 4-cylinder N13 engine to 3-cylinder B38.
- 120i model introduced, powered by the 4-cylinder N13 engine.
- M135i power increase of 5 kW (7 hp)

=== 2016 ===
- M140i model replaces the M135i, powered by the 6-cylinder B58 engine.
- 120i model changed from 4-cylinder N13 engine to 4-cylinder B48.
- 125i model changed from 4-cylinder N20 engine to 4-cylinder B48.

=== 2017 ===
- New M Sport Shadow Edition trim level.
- New exterior colours: Seaside Blue and Sunset Orange.
- New alloy wheel designs.
- Revised dashboard design, interior switches and instrument cluster.
- iDrive upgraded to version 6.0.

== Motorsport ==
=== British Touring Car Championship ===
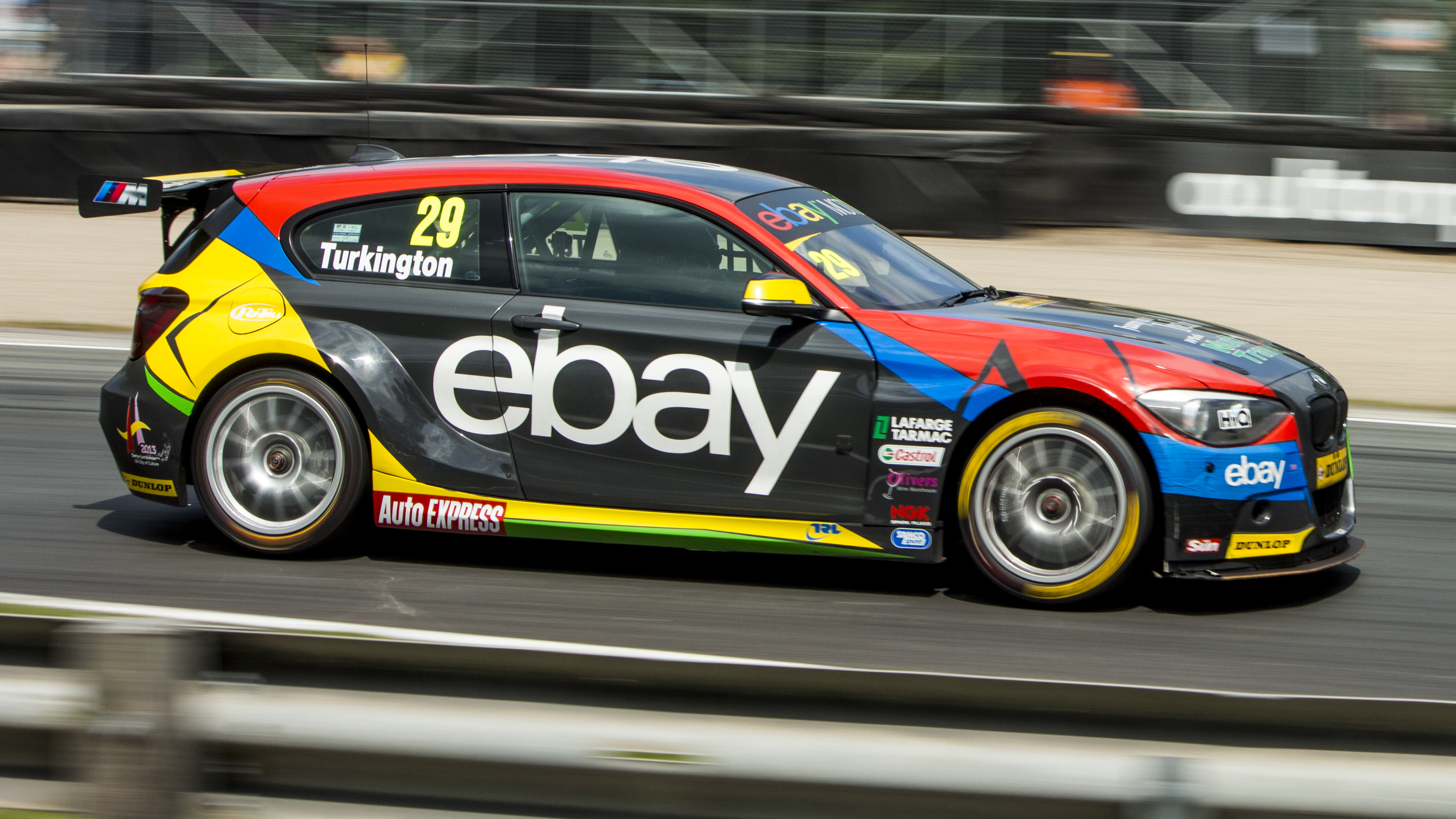
Turkington racing at Oulton Park in 2013

The F20 raced in the British Touring Car Championship, from 2013 to 2020. The BTCC BMW 125i M Sport entry won the Drivers' title in 2014 and 2018 with Colin Turkington (Turkington also winning the Independent Drivers' title and WSR the Teams' titles both outright and for Independents in 2014) and also won the Constructors' Championship and Teams' Championship every year from 2016 to 2018.

Carl Boardley came Runner-up in the Jack Sears Trophy in a 125i in the 2020 Season.

The car was later used as a test car for the Hybrid technology that was introduced for the 2022 Season.

=== TCR Touring Car Racing ===
A 125i briefly raced in the 2021 Touring Car Trophy Season.

=== BMW 1 Series Supercup ===
In 2022, the BRSCC introduced the BMW 1 Series Supercup for F20 and F21 models.

The series was merged with the BMW Compact Cup for the 2025 Season.

== Production ==
The F20/F21 is produced in Leipzig, Germany and Regensburg, Germany. Complete knock-down (CKD) assembly of the F20/F21 is conducted in Araquari, Brazil; Chennai, India; Kulim, Malaysia (by Inokom); and Rayong, Thailand.

== Safety ==
ANCAP test results* BMW 1 Series 1.6L petrol engine variants (2011)
Test	Score
Overall	5 /5 stars
Frontal offset	15.45/16
Side impact	15.88/16
Pole	2/2
Seat belt reminders	3/3
Whiplash protection	Not Assessed
Pedestrian protection	Adequate
Electronic stability control	Standard

Euro NCAP test results* BMW 116i (LHD) (2012)
Test	Points	%
Overall:	5 /5 stars	
Adult occupant:	33	91%
Child occupant:	41	83%
Pedestrian:	23	63%
Safety assist:	6	86%

== Awards ==
In 2011, the F20/F21 1 Series won the Bild am Sonntag magazine Golden Steering Wheel award.

In 2015, the M135i was the Sport Auto magazine winner of best compact car up to €50,000.

In 2017, the M140i was the What Car? magazine winner of best hot hatch over £25,000.
