= BMW N47 =

BMW N47 engine
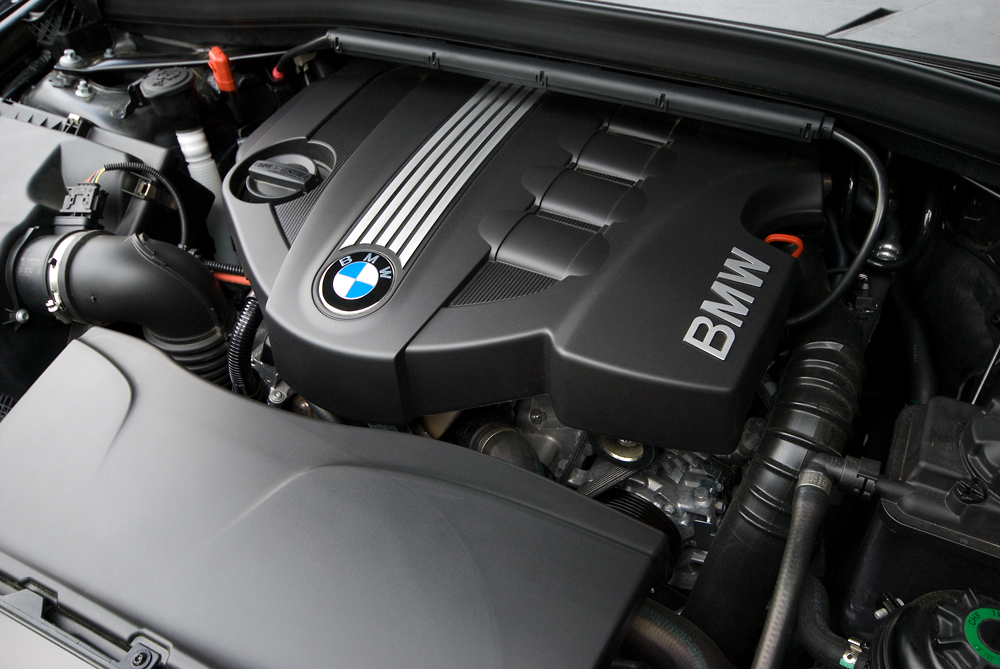

Overview
- Manufacturer: BMW
- Production: March 2007 - September 2014

Layout
- Configuration: Straight-4
- Displacement: 1.6 L (1,598 cc); 2.0 L (1,995 cc)
- Cylinder bore: 78 mm (3.1 in); 84 mm (3.3 in)
- Piston stroke: 83.6 mm (3.29 in); 90 mm (3.54 in)
- Compression ratio: 16.1:1-16.5:1

Combustion
- Turbocharger: Variable-geometry turbocharger sequential twin-turbo (some versions)
- Fuel system: Common rail direct injection
- Fuel type: Diesel fuel (DIN EN 590)
- Cooling system: Water-cooled

Output
- Power output: 70–160 kW (94–215 hp)
- Torque output: 235–450 N⋅m (173–332 lb⋅ft)

Emissions
- Emissions control systems: EGR DPF

Chronology
- Predecessor: BMW M47
- Successor: BMW B37 (C15, 1.5L); BMW B47 (D20, 2.0L)

BMW N47 is a four-cylinder common rail diesel engine that has many improvements over its predecessor, the M47. In 2014 it was replaced with the B47. The USA market never received B47 engine. The only B diesel engine in the US received was the B57 (6 cyl) in the 2018 model 540d. The newest 4 cylinder diesel in the US was N47TU.

== First use ==
The N47 engine debuted in March 2007 in the facelifted 1 Series BMW E87 and E81 and was available in the 1 Series BMW E82 and E88, which were introduced later in the same year.

== Usage in other models ==
The engine also became available in the 5 Series BMW E60 and E61 from September 2007, several months after the 5 series was face lifted, during which time the older M47 remained available.

In the 2008 model year 3 Series E90/E91/E92/E93 when the entire 3 series range gained the company's Efficient Dynamics technology. Not long after it became available in the X3 and has since then become available in the X1.

The N47 comes as a 1.6 L; 97.5 cu in (1,598 cc) (D16) and 2.0 L; 121.7 cu in (1,995 cc) (D20) unit, the latter identical in capacity to the M47TU/TU2 series.

Toyota also used the 1.6 L and 2.0 L in many of their European spec vehicles and refers to it as the WW Engine.

=== 1.6 L (97.5 cu in, 1,598 cc, D16) ===
==== 70 kW version ====
The 70 kW (94 hp) tune was used in the F20 114d.

==== 85 kW version ====
The 85 kW (114 hp) tune was used in the F20 116d EfficientDynamics version.

It features the exact same performance figures on paper as the regular 116d (which utilises the D20 in an 85 kW variant) despite the smaller engine size.

=== 2.0 L (121.7 cu in, 1,995 cc, D20) ===
==== 85 kW version ====
The 85 kW (114 hp) tune is for the entry level E81 F20 and E87 116d, as well as the entry level 3 Series E90 316d. It was also used in the 3 Series F30 316d.

==== 105 kW version ====
The 105 kW (141 hp) model was used in the following:

- E81, E82, E87 and E88 118d
- E90 and E91 318d
- F10 518d
- F20 118d
- F30 and F31 318d
- 2009–2015 BMW E84 sDrive18d and xDrive18d
- 2010–2016 MINI Countryman Cooper SD (R60)
- 2010–2014 MINI Cooper SD (R56)
- 2010–2015 MINI Cabrio Cooper SD (R57)
- 2010–2015 MINI Coupe Cooper SD (R58)
- 2012–2015 MINI Roadster Cooper SD (R59)
- 2013–2016 MINI Paceman Cooper SD (R61)
- 2014–2015 F22 218d
- X3 sDrive18d.

==== 120 kW version ====
A new 120 kW (161 hp) 360 N⋅m (266 lb⋅ft) derivative was introduced in September 2009 for the 2010 model year. This version featured exceptionally low CO_{2} emissions of only 109 g/km (6.2 oz/mi) and fuel consumption of 68.9 mpg.

This version was used in the E90 BMW 320d Efficient Dynamics and 520d F07/F10/F11.

==== 130 kW version ====
The "standard" x20d model has extra power, producing 130 kW (174 hp) but 7 lb⋅ft (9 N⋅m) of torque less at 350 N⋅m (258 lb⋅ft). This is found in the

- E81/E82/E87/E88 120d
- E90/E91/E92/E93 320d
- F30/F31/F34/F35 320d
- 5 Series E60 and E61 520d
- E84 X1 X1 sDrive20d, X1 xDrive20d and E83 X3 xDrive20d.
- 2014–2015 F22 220d

In Europe, this particular version is one of the most popular engines in the entire range; the best selling 3 series is the 320d, while the 520d is the UK's best selling 5 series.

The updated version of this engine introduced in March 2010 produces 135 kW (181 hp) at 4000 rpm and 380 N⋅m (280 lb⋅ft) at 1750-2750 rpm.

==== Twin turbo version ====
In October 2007, BMW introduced a twin sequential turbo model. With 150 kW (201 hp), it is the first production diesel on sale to achieve a specific output of over 100 hp (75 kW) per liter. It uses the same turbo technology first shown in the E60 535d.

The 150 kW (201 hp) model was used in the

- E81/E82/E87/E88 123d
- E84 X1 xDrive 23d
- 2014–2015 F22 225d
- E90 Alpina D3 (214 PS (157 kW; 211 hp))

Later, the engine received an update which boosted the output to 160 kW (215 hp) and was used on these models:

- F20 125d
- F22 225d
- F30 325d
- F32 425d
- F10 525d
- E84 X1 xDrive 25d

== Variants ==
Engine	Displacement	Compression Ratio	Power	Torque	Years
N47D16	1.6 L (1,598 cc)	16.5:1	70 kW (94 hp) at 4000 rpm	235 N⋅m (173 lb⋅ft) at 1500-2750 rpm	2013
N47D16	1.6 L (1,598 cc)	16.5:1	85 kW (114 hp) at 4000 rpm	260 N⋅m (192 lb⋅ft) at 1500-2750 rpm	2012
N47D20	2.0 L (1,995 cc)	16.5:1	85 kW (114 hp) at 4000 rpm	260 N⋅m (192 lb⋅ft) at 1750 rpm	09/2009
N47D20	2.0 L (1,995 cc)	16.5:1	105 kW (141 hp) at 4000 rpm	300 N⋅m (221 lb⋅ft) at 3000 rpm	03/2007
N47D20	2.0 L (1,995 cc)	16.5:1	120 kW (161 hp) at 4000 rpm	340 N⋅m (251 lb⋅ft) at 2000 rpm	09/2009
N47D20	2.0 L (1,995 cc)	16.5:1	130 kW (174 hp) at 4000 rpm	350 N⋅m (258 lb⋅ft) at 3000 rpm	03/2007
N47D20	2.0 L (1,995 cc)	16.5:1	135 kW (181 hp) at 4000 rpm	380 N⋅m (280 lb⋅ft) at 2750 rpm	03/2010
N47D20	2.0 L (1,995 cc)	16.1:1	150 kW (201 hp) at 4400 rpm	400 N⋅m (295 lb⋅ft) at 2000 rpm	03/2010
N47D20	2.0 L (1,995 cc)	16.5:1	160 kW (215 hp) at 4400 rpm	450 N⋅m (332 lb⋅ft) at 2500 rpm	2011

== Timing chain problems ==
The N47 engine family is prone to excessive timing chain wear and premature failure. Rattling noise from the rear of the engine is indicative of the condition. Timing chain failure may call for engine replacement or a costly repair. The most seriously affected units which require the most extensive repairs were produced from 1 March 2007 to 5 January 2009. However, there have been reports of timing chain failure in BMW diesel engines manufactured until 2015. At times the failure has resulted in a dangerous cut out of the engine while the vehicle was being driven - sometimes at relatively high speed. A "Quality Enhancement" was issued by BMW for some, but not all vehicles, but has since been discontinued.

== Other issues ==
The return spring on the turbo's wastegate was not originally lubricated or covered, this frequently resulted in early failure causing the waste-gate to remain partially or fully open. With the subsequent loss in boost, fuel consumption increased by 30–50%. The problem was described by BMW engineers as a "known fault" and was immediately repaired (BMW mobile engineers even carried boxes of an improved spring), however BMW refused to compensate customers for the excessive fuel consumption and denied this fault was their liability.

As the cars equipped with this engine are coming of age, some hoses in the engine bay can start to break down. This is not to be ignored, even though this does not illuminate the CEL, it just sets a code in the ECU. If the vacuum hose supplying the EGR cooler bypass valve gets a hole rubbed in it, or breaks down from old age and oil spray, the EGR cooler won't get bypassed during the engine warmup period. This causes excessive buildup in the cooler matrix, and when the engine warms up these solid chunks of buildup can detach from the EGR cooler and get sucked into the plastic intake tube, melting holes in the intake tube, causing a massive boost leak and in very rare cases an engine fire. BMW has issued a recall to over 1.6 million vehicles in 2018 for the EGR issues.

== See also ==
- Toyota WW engine
- List of BMW engines
