= BMW B37 engine =

BMW B37
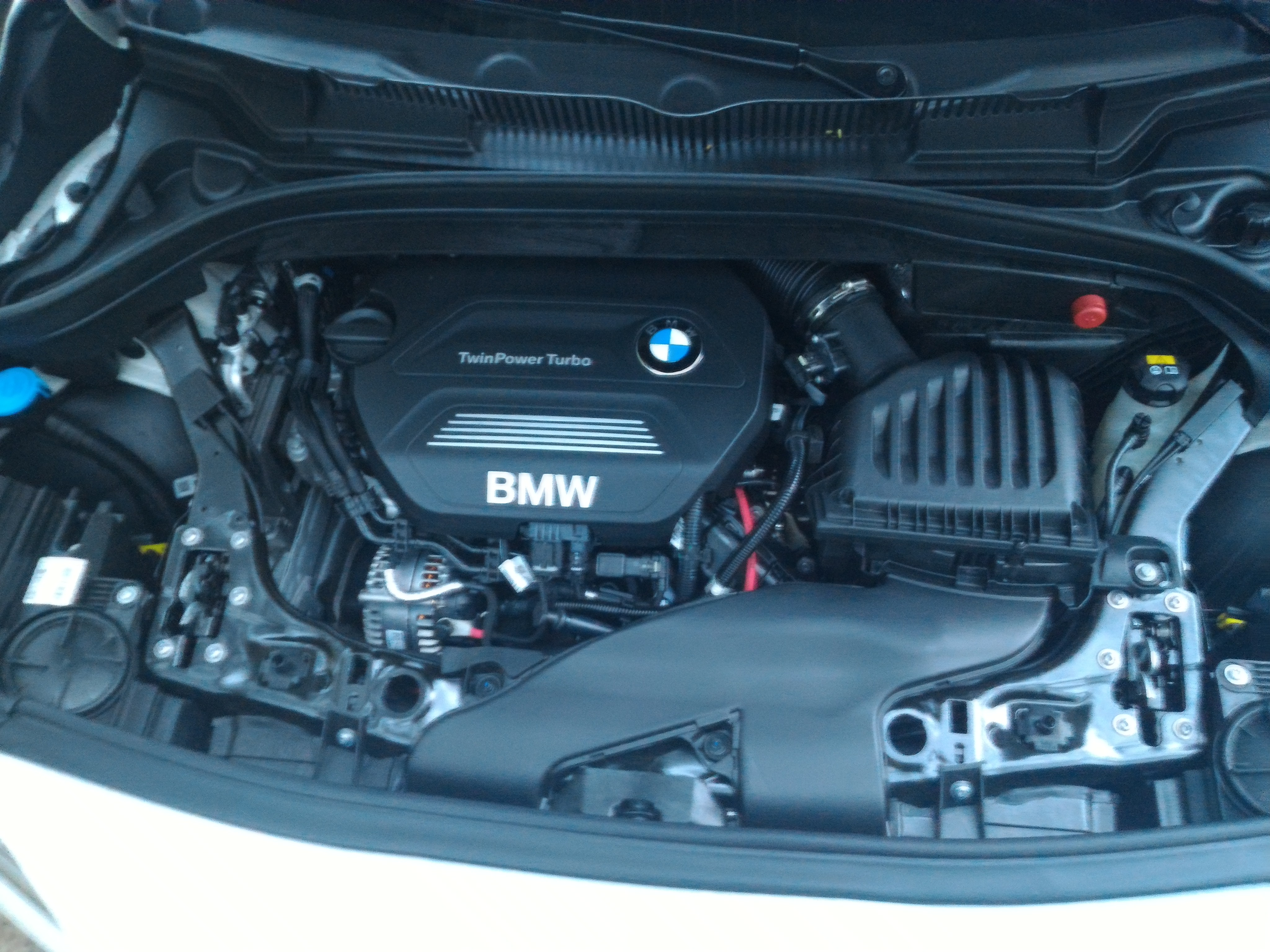

Overview
- Manufacturer: BMW
- Production: 2012-present

Layout
- Configuration: Straight-3
- Displacement: 1.5 L (1,496 cc)
- Cylinder bore: 84 mm (3.31 in)
- Piston stroke: 90 mm (3.54 in)
- Compression ratio: 16.5:1

Combustion
- Turbocharger: Single, mono-scroll and VGT
- Fuel system: Common rail direct injection
- Fuel type: Diesel fuel (DIN EN 590)
- Cooling system: Water-cooled

Output
- Power output: 70–85 kW; 94–114 hp
- Torque output: 220–270 N⋅m; 162–199 lb⋅ft

Chronology
- Predecessor: BMW N47

The BMW B37 is a 1.5-litre (1,496 cc), diesel, straight-three engine with a single, mono-scroll and variable-geometry turbocharger. The compression ratio is 16.5:1. It is the second engine from BMW's modular engine plan, sharing most of its components with the BMW B38 petrol engine. Power output is either 70 or 85 kW (94 or 114 hp).

== Models ==
Engine	Power output	Torque
B37C15K0	70 kW (94 hp) @ 4000 rpm	220 N⋅m (162 lb⋅ft) @ 1750–2250 rpm 220 N⋅m (162 lb⋅ft) @ 1500–2500 rpm (Note: Depending on engine management.)
B37C15U0	85 kW (114 hp) @ 4000 rpm	270 N⋅m (199 lb⋅ft) @ 1750–2250 rpm

Technical data from BMW 2 Series Active Tourer, MINI 3 Door, MINI 5 Door.

== Applications ==
=== 70 kW (94 hp) ===
- F20LCI as 114d (Note: Available in select markets (e.g. Portugal); The 114d was removed with the LCI2 in late 2017.) (from November 2015)
- F45 as 214d Active Tourer (from March 2015)
- F46 as 214d Gran Tourer (from July 2015)
- F56 (MINI) as MINI One D 3 (from March 2014)
- F55 (MINI) as MINI One D 5 Door (from October 2014)

=== 85 kW (114 hp) ===
- F20 as 116d (from March 2015)
- F20LCI as 116d (from November 2015)
- F20LCI as 116d ED (from November 2015)
- F21LCI as 116d (from November 2015)
- F21LCI as 116d ED (from November 2015)
- F44 as 216d Gran Coupé (from 2020)
- F45 as 216d Active Tourer (from November 2014)
- F46 as 216d Gran Tourer (from March 2015)
- F48 as X1 sDrive16d (from October 2015)
- F56 (MINI) as MINI Cooper D 3 Door (from March 2014)
- F55 (MINI) as MINI Cooper D 5 Door (from October 2014)
- F40 as 116d (from July 2019)
