= BMW B38 engine =

1.5 liter 3 cylinder petrol engine

B38 engine
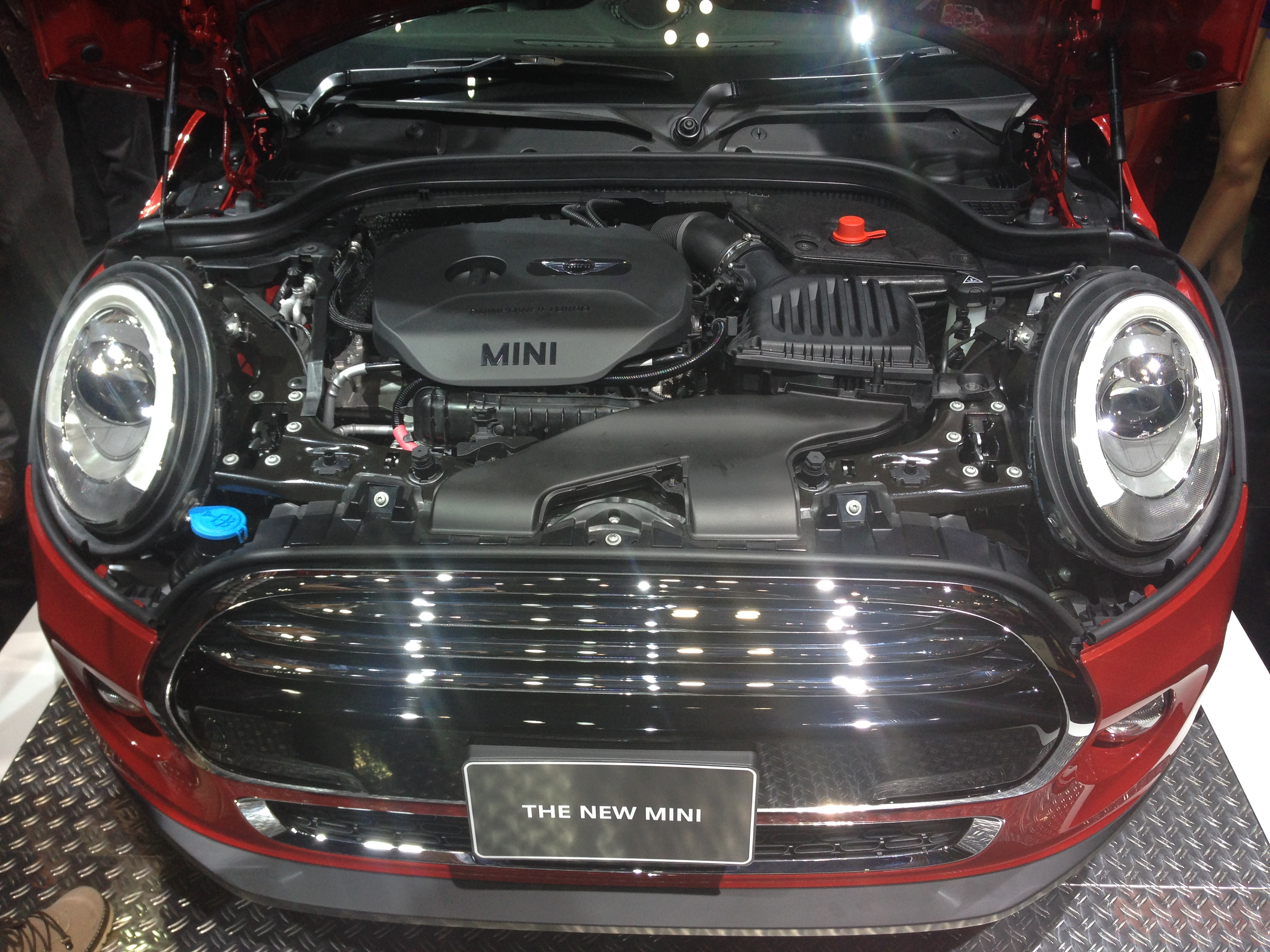

Overview
- Manufacturer: BMW
- Production: 2013–present

Layout
- Configuration: Straight-3
- Displacement: 1.2 L (1,198 cc); 1.5 L (1,499 cc)
- Cylinder bore: 78 mm (3.1 in); 82 mm (3.2 in)
- Piston stroke: 83.6 mm (3.29 in); 94.6 mm (3.72 in)
- Valvetrain: DOHC
- Compression ratio: 11:1

Combustion
- Turbocharger: Single-scroll
- Fuel system: Direct injection
- Fuel type: Gasoline

Chronology
- Predecessor: BMW N13

The BMW B38 is a 1.2 and 1.5 L (1,198 and 1,499 cc) turbocharged straight-three DOHC petrol engine, which replaced the straight-four BMW N13. Production started in 2013.

It is part of a modular BMW engine family, of straight-three (B38), straight-four (B48) and straight-six (B58) alloy block and head petrol engines, which use a displacement of 400 cc (24.4 cu in) per cylinder in the 1.2 and 500 cc (30.5 cu in) per cylinder in the 1.5. It specifically shares a lot of components with the BMW B37, due to their same size/configuration.

The B38 is used in front-wheel drive cars (such as the Mini Hatch and BMW 2 Series Active Tourer), as well as BMW's traditional rear-wheel drive and all-wheel drive (xDrive) configurations. The first car to use the B38 is the BMW i8 hybrid sports coupé, where it is used as a transverse mid-mounted engine.

== Design ==
The B38 features direct injection, an 11:1 compression ratio, variable valve timing (double-VANOS) and the single-scroll turbocharger with the world's first aluminium turbine housing, manufactured by Continental.

On the 1.2 liter versions, the bore is 78 mm (3.1 in) and the stroke is 83.6 mm (3.3 in). On the 1.5 liter versions, the bore is 82 mm (3.2 in) and the stroke is 94.6 mm (3.7 in).

== Models ==
Engine	Displacement	Power	Torque	Years
B38A12U0	1,198 cc (73 cu in)	55 kW (74 bhp) at 4,000 rpm	150 N⋅m (111 lb⋅ft) at 1,400–4,000 rpm	2014–
B38A12U0	1,198 cc (73 cu in)	75 kW (101 bhp) at 4,250 rpm	180 N⋅m (133 lb⋅ft) at 1,400–4,000 rpm	2014–
B38A15M0 / B38B15M0	1,499 cc (91 cu in)	100 kW (134 bhp)–116 kW (156 bhp) at 4,400–6,000 rpm	220 N⋅m (162 lb⋅ft)–230 N⋅m (170 lb⋅ft) at 1,250–4,300 rpm	2014–2018
B38K15T0	1,499 cc (91 cu in)	170 kW (228 bhp) at 5,800 rpm	320 N⋅m (236 lb⋅ft) at 3,700 rpm	2013–
B38A15M1 / B38B15M1 (improvement of B38A15M0)	1,499 cc (91 cu in)	104 kW (139 bhp) at 4,400–6,000 rpm	220 N⋅m (162 lb⋅ft) at 1,250–4,300 rpm	2018–

=== B38A12U0 ===
Applications:

55 kW (74 hp) version:

- 2014–2024 F55/F56 Mini One First

75 kW (101 hp) version:

- 2014–2018 F55/F56 Mini One

=== B38A15M0 / B38B15M0 (B38A15M1/B38B15M1 for post-2018 manufactured engines) ===
Applications:

75 kW (101 hp) version:

- 2015–2021 BMW F45/F46 216i Active Tourer / Gran Tourer
- 2018–2024 F55/F56 Mini One

80 kW (107 hp) version:

- 2015–2019 BMW F20/F21 116i

100 kW (134 hp) version (104kW (141bhp) for post-2018 manufacture)

- 2015–2019 BMW F20/F21 118i
- 2015–2021 BMW F22/F23 218i coupe / convertible
- 2014–2021 BMW F45/F46 218i Active Tourer / Gran Tourer
- 2015–2019 BMW F30/F31 318i LCI
- 2015–2021 BMW F48 X1 sDrive18i
- 2014–present Mini F55/F56/F57 Cooper
- 2015–2019 Mini F54 Clubman
- 2017–present Mini F60 Countryman
- 2017–2023 BMW F39 X2 sDrive18i
- 2017–2021 BMW F45 225xe Active Tourer (PHEV)
- 2019–present BMW F40 118i
- 2019–present BMW F44 218i Gran Coupé
- 2020–2023 BMW F39 xDrive25e116 kW (156 bhp) version:

=== B38A15M2 ===
Applications:

- 2022–present BMW U11/12 X1
- 2021–present BMW U06
- 2023–present BMW U10 X2

=== B38K15T0 ===
Applications:

- 2013–2020 BMW I12 i8
- 2020–present Karma Revero GT/GTS
