= Ian Robertson (businessman) =

English automotive executive

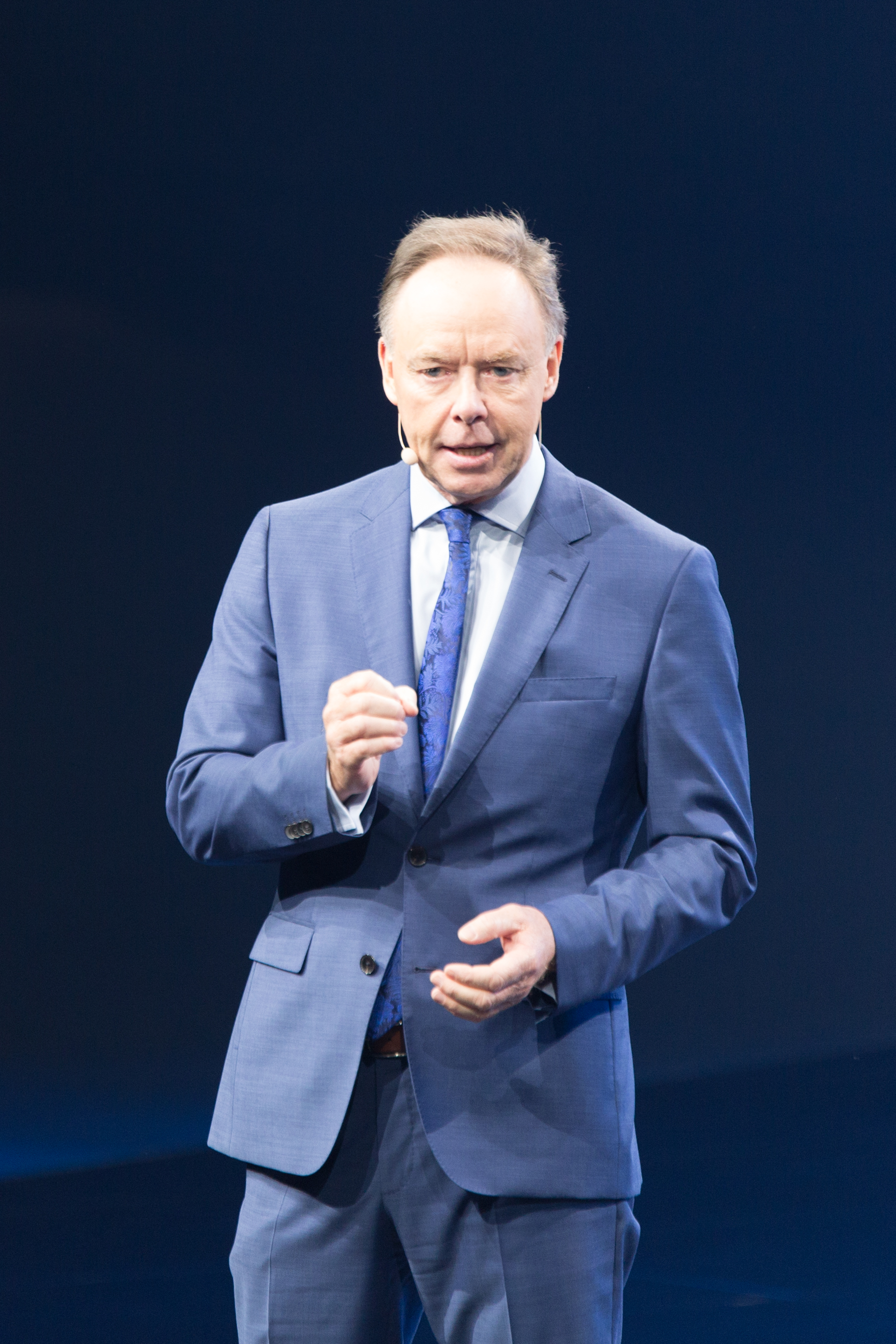
Ian Robertson

Ian Stuart Robertson CMG (born 5 June 1958) is an English businessman and an automotive executive on the board of management of BMW Group responsible for Sales and Brand BMW and Aftersales BMW Group. He has been a member of the board since 2008.

In 2011, he was awarded an Honorary DSc by Aston University for his outstanding service and achievements in the fields of business and engineering.

Robertson was appointed Companion of the Order of St Michael and St George (CMG) in the 2012 Birthday Honours for services to the British car industry.

== Early life ==
Robertson was born in Oswestry, Shropshire and graduated with a Bachelor's of Science in Maritime Studies from the University of Wales, Cardiff in 1979.

== Career ==
Seemingly destined to join the oil industry with many friends at the time becoming mud engineers on oil rigs in various far-flung parts of the world, Robertson's first job offer was with Halliburton in Kuwait. The prospect of being away from people for six weeks at a time did not appeal, and cars had always been a passion of his. He joined Rover Group as a graduate trainee for Rover in 1979.

=== Rover Group ===
Robertson held numerous roles within Rover Group, including Plant Director Drews Lane Plant (1988-1990) and Plant Director Powertrain (1990-1994), before becoming purchasing director in 1994.

He became managing director of Land Rover in 1994, the same year that BMW acquired the Rover Group from British Aerospace.

=== BMW ===
In 1999, he became managing director of BMW South Africa, taking on responsibility for their sales, marketing, and manufacturing operations in that territory. He oversaw the introduction of the BMW 3-Series E46 generation into Plant Rosslyn. In 2000, BMW disposed of the Land Rover marque to Ford Motor Company, severing his ties with the Rover Group.

In 2005, he returned to England to become chairman and chief executive of BMW's subsidiary Rolls-Royce Motor Cars, where he oversaw steady sales growth and was involved in the development of the Rolls-Royce Ghost.

In 2008 he was promoted to member of the board of management, the first Briton to have this role, responsible for BMW AG, Sales and Marketing, and chairman of Rolls-Royce Motor Cars Ltd. He was responsible for global sales and marketing activities across BMW, BMW Motorrad, MINI and Rolls-Royce in all global markets.

In 2012, with the appointment of Peter Schwarzenbauer to the BMW board of management, Robertson's responsibilities shifted slightly; he became responsible solely for BMW Brand Sales and Marketing, and BMW Group Sales Channel. In turn, Schwarzenbauer picked up operational responsibility for MINI, Rolls-Royce, BMW Motorrad, and Aftersales BMW Group.

In March 2017, he was appointed to his current role at BMW. He was due to step at the end of 2017, and continued with BMW in an ambassadorial role until his official retirement in June 2018.

== Personal life ==
He is married with two grown up children, and resides just outside of Munich, Germany. He can speak German, albeit not fluently, and is a keen skier.
