= Hammer & Coop =

Marketing campaign

Hammer & Coop was part of a marketing campaign for automobile manufacturer Mini in 2007. The campaign consisted of television commercials and a 6-episode video series that parodied action series from the 80s, especially Knight Rider.

In the series, Hammer (Bryan Callen) was a man of mystery and Coop was a 2007 Mini with artificial intelligence that spoke in a glib British voice. Coop was the product of an apparent military contractor named Silverfox.

The campaign was created by Butler, Shine, Stern and Partners and the films were directed by Todd Phillips.

== Episodes ==
Episode	Summary
Episode 1: "Clean Getaway"	Hammer is roughed up by a burly man, named Reggie, who is looking for Coop. Coop enters the scene and rescues Hammer. The two head for California to pick up a package, but stop on the way at a bikini car wash. Reggie follows them in a pickup truck.
Episode 2: "Dawn of Silverfox"	Hammer wakes up with one of the car wash girls and learns he's been followed by Reggie. Hammer and Coop escape. Reggie calls his boss, Silverfox, to tell him he wasn't able to catch Coop. Silverfox, a wealthy man and apparent military contractor, reflects back 8 weeks to when he was introducing Coop (Coop-Zero 7) to military men.
Episode 3: "Ninjas, Ninjas and More Ninjas"	Hammer and Coop are found by Reggie and three ninjas. Hammer dispatches with them and drives off. Silverfox slyly suggests to his assistant that he is using the incompetent Reggie because he may not really want the car to be brought back.
Episode 4: "Caviar Dreams"	Hammer and Coop stop to pick up a pretty woman who has run out of gas. Silverfox receives a call from Vladamir, a Russian seeking to hear the latest news on a "package". In a flashback 8 weeks earlier, Coop is being demonstrated to the military and breaks out of the indoor course and drives off, to the hidden delight of Silverfox.
Episode 5: "Making Time"	Hammer, Coop, and the pretty woman spend an evening in the desert. In a flashback, Hammer explains how he was left in the middle of the desert, in his underwear, with no memory, when Coop discovered him. The next morning, the trio goes to a warehouse for the package. There, Silverfox appears and Hammer and Coop learn they've been betrayed by the woman. Silverfox explains that he staged Coop's escape from the military so that he could sell him on the black market to the Russian mob. Hammer is knocked unconscious by Silverfox's men.
Episode 6: "The Package"	Hammer wakes to find himself tied up. He manages to escape using a dessert fork and dispatches two guards to recover Coop. He then proceeds to chase down Silverfox and turns him over to the military. In the end, a General hands Coop's keys over to Hammer.

There was also a music video in which Hammer performed Heat of the Moment by the band Asia.References
