= Mini (marque) =

British automotive brand

- Logo used since 2018
- Product type: Cars
- Current owner: BMW AG (2000–present)
- Produced by: BMW
- Country: United Kingdom
- Introduced: As a car model 1959; 67 years ago; As a standalone marque 1969; 57 years ago
- Related brands: John Cooper Works
- Markets: Worldwide
- Previous owners: British Motor Corporation (1959–1968); British Leyland (1968–1986); Rover Group (1986–2000)
- Ambassador: Jean-Philippe Parain (Mini brand CEO)
- Website: www.mini.com

Mini (stylised all-uppercase as MINI) is a British automotive brand founded in Oxford in 1969, marketed by German multinational automotive company BMW since 2000, and used by it for a range of small cars assembled in the United Kingdom, Austria, Netherlands (until 16 February 2024), China, and Germany. The current Mini range includes the Cooper Hardtop/Hatch/Convertible (three and five-door hatchback), Aceman and Countryman (five-door crossovers). The word Mini has been used in car model names since 1959, and in 1969 it became a marque in its own right when the name "Mini" replaced the separate "Austin Mini" and "Morris Mini" car model names. BMW acquired the brand in 1994 when it bought Rover Group (formerly British Leyland), which owned Mini, among other marques.

The original Mini was a line of British small cars manufactured by the British Motor Corporation (BMC), which in 1966 became part of British Motor Holdings. This merged with Leyland Motors in 1968 to form British Leyland. In the 1980s, British Leyland was broken-up and in 1988 Rover Group, including Mini, was acquired by British Aerospace. Mini models included the Morris Mini-Minor and the Austin Seven, the Countryman, Moke, 1275GT and Clubman. Performance versions of these models used the name Cooper, due to a partnership with racing team owner John Cooper. The original Mini continued in production until 2000.

Following BMW's acquisition of Rover Group, BMW broke up the company but retained the Mini brand, beginning development of a modern successor to the Mini which was launched in 2001 by BMW and built at the historic former Morris Motors 'Plant Oxford' site in Cowley, Oxfordshire. The Mini Clubman, Coupe and Roadster were also assembled here. The third (F57) generation Mini Convertible and second (F60) generation of the Countryman were assembled at VDL Nedcar in Born, Netherlands. The Mini (F56) 3-door Hatch/Hardtop was assembled at both plants, with the (F55) 5-door being exclusively assembled at Oxford. The Paceman and first generation (R60) Countryman were assembled by Magna Steyr in Austria. The third generation (U25) of the Mini Countryman is produced in Germany at BMW's Leipzig plant. From 2024, all combustion engined (F65/F66/F67) Mini Cooper hatch and convertible production will be centred at Oxford. A total of 301,526 Mini vehicles by BMW were sold worldwide in 2012.

Mini vehicles have been active in rallying and the Mini Cooper S won the Monte Carlo Rally on three occasions, in 1964, 1965 and 1967. Mini participated in the World Rally Championship in 2011 and 2012 through the Prodrive WRC Team.

== History ==
=== 1959 to 1990 ===
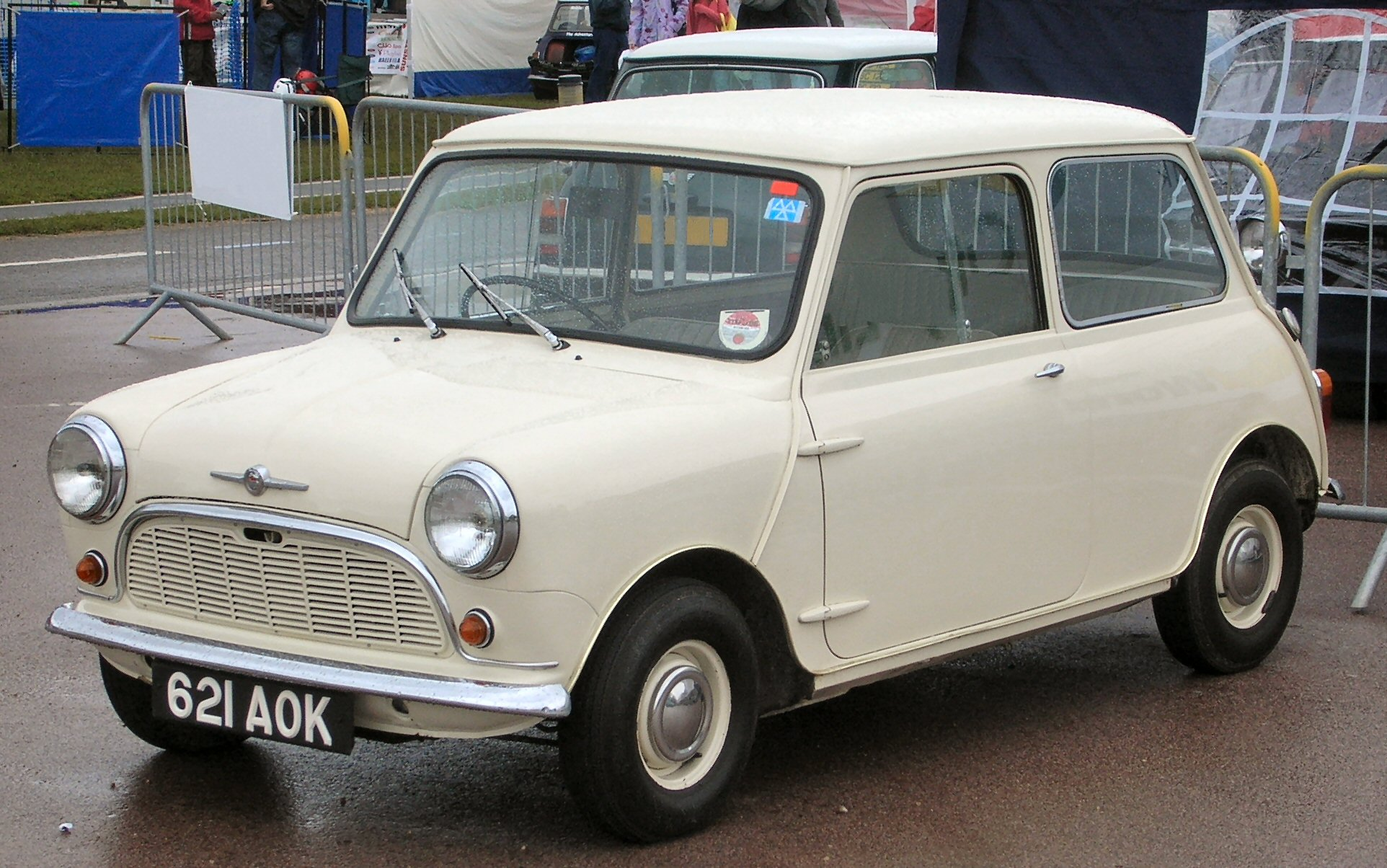
1959 Morris Mini-Minor

The original two-door Mini was a small car produced by the British Motor Corporation (BMC) and its successors from 1959 until 2000. It is considered an icon of the 1960s, and its space-saving front-wheel-drive layout (which allowed 80% of the area of the car's floorpan to be used for passengers and luggage) influenced a generation of car-makers. The vehicle is in some ways considered the British equivalent to its German contemporary, the Volkswagen Beetle, which enjoyed similar popularity in North America. In 1999 the Mini was voted the second most influential car of the 20th Century, behind the Ford Model T.

This distinctive two-door car was designed for BMC by Sir Alec Issigonis. It was manufactured at the Longbridge and Cowley plants in England, the Victoria Park / Zetland British Motor Corporation (Australia) factory in Sydney, Australia, and later also in Spain (Authi), Belgium, Chile, Italy (Innocenti), Portugal, South Africa, Uruguay, Venezuela and Yugoslavia. The Mini Mark I had three major UK updates: the Mark II, the Clubman and the Mark III. Within these was a series of variations including an estate car, a pickup truck, a van and the Mini Moke—a jeep-like buggy. The Mini Cooper and Cooper "S" were sportier versions that were successful as rally cars, winning the Monte Carlo Rally four times from 1964 through to 1967, although in 1966 the Mini was disqualified after the finish, along with six other British entrants, which included the first four cars to finish, under a questionable ruling that the cars had used an illegal combination of headlamps and spotlights. Initially Minis were marketed under the Austin and Morris names, as the Austin Seven and Morris Mini-Minor, until Mini became a marque in its own right in 1969. The Mini was again marketed under the Austin name in the 1980s.

=== 1990 to 2000 ===
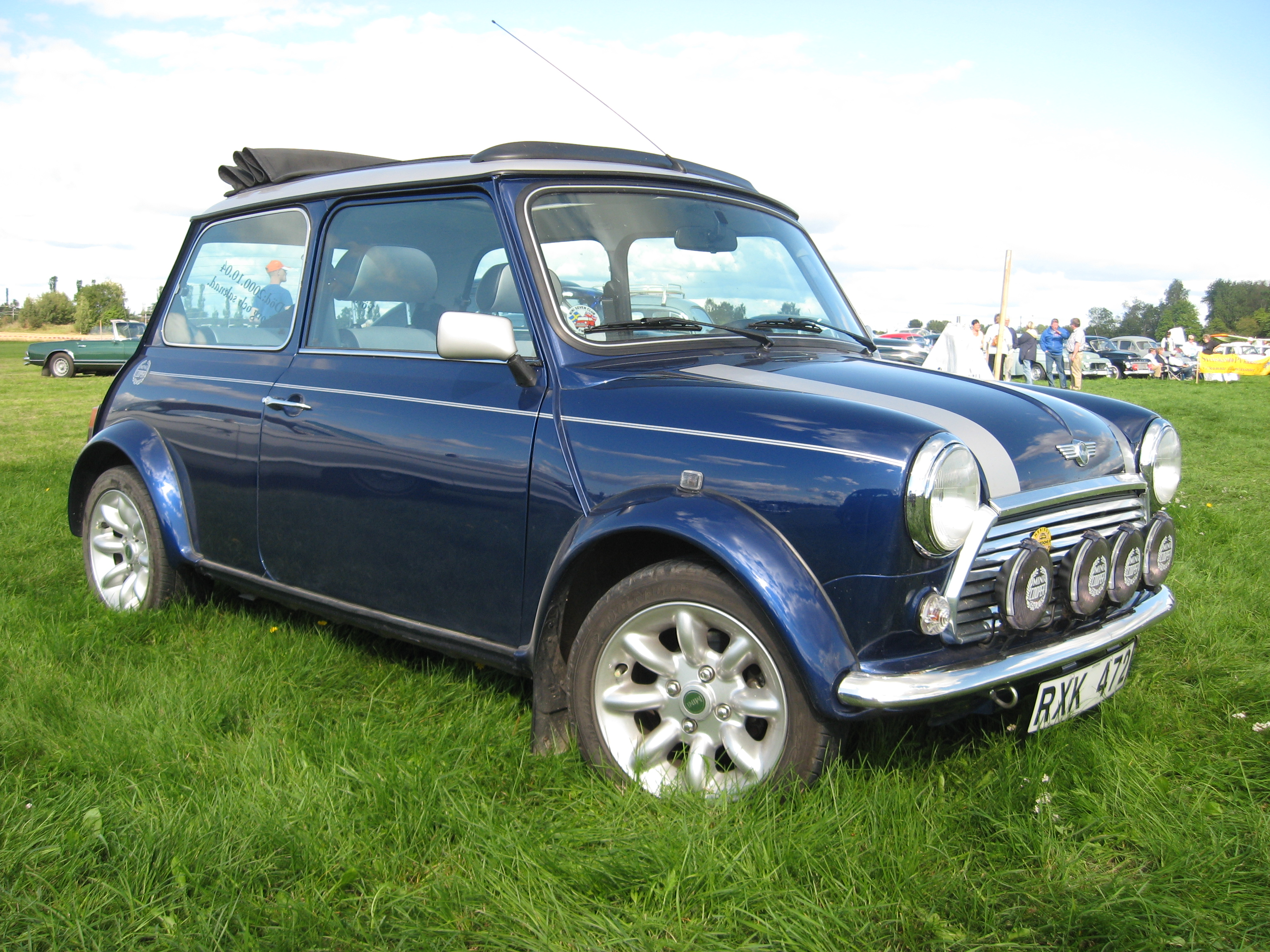
Mini Cooper S, 2000

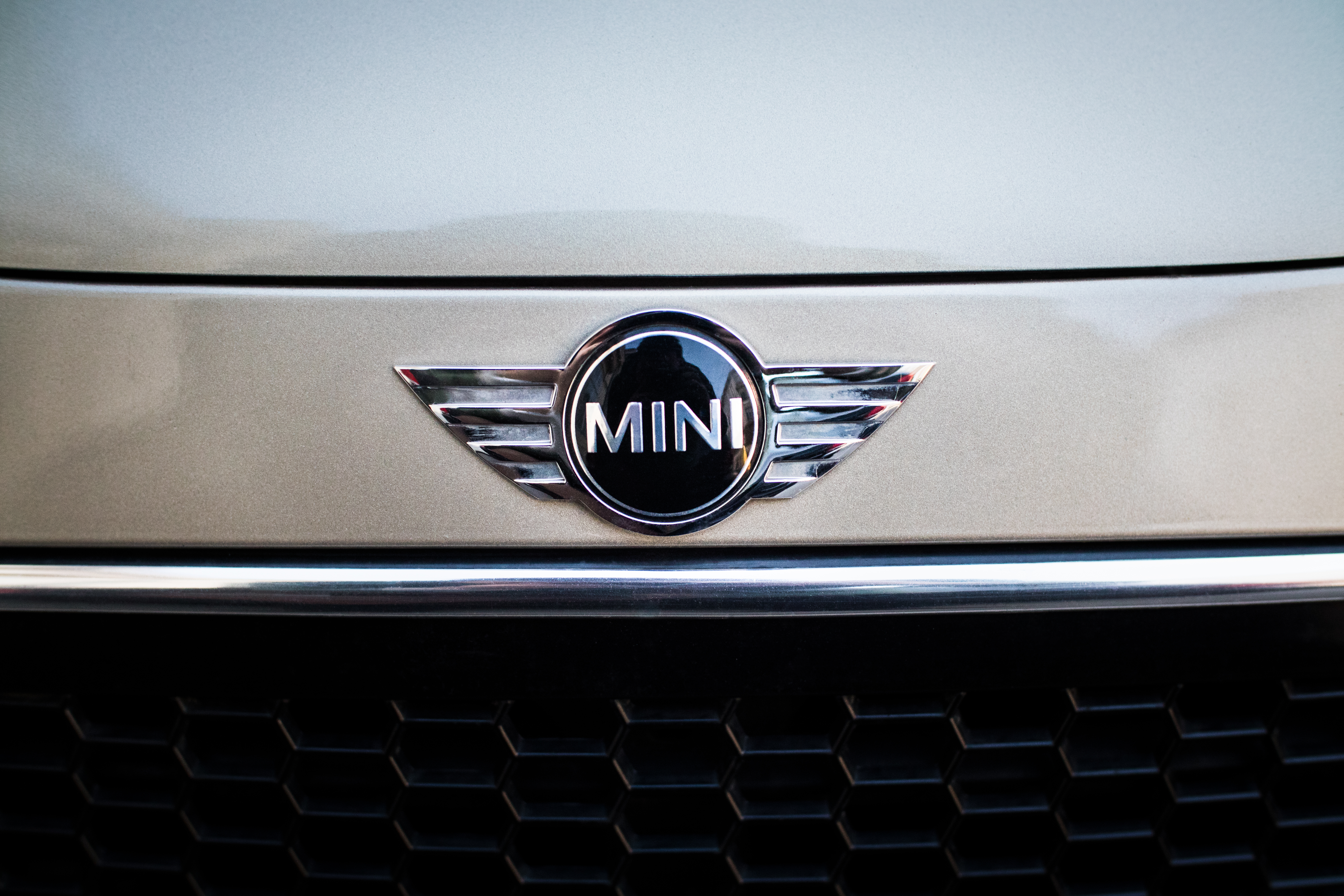
Former logo used from 1997 to 2018

In the 1990s, BMW was seeking to broaden its model range through the addition of compact cars and SUVs. This sparked a series of compact car concept vehicles from the company during the early 1990s. The first were the E1 and Z13, powered by an electric motor and a rear-mounted 1100 cc BMW motorcycle engine, respectively.

In early 1994, BMW acquired the Rover Group from British Aerospace, which owned Mini, among other brands. BMW insisted that even a compact model must feature traditional BMW characteristics (such as rear wheel drive) to uphold the company's standards and image. The "MINI" marque, however, did not share these standards and BMW saw this as an opportunity to create a competitively priced, yet premium, compact car. This formed BMW's plan to launch the premium BMW 1 Series and the mid-range Mini.

It was at around this time that Rover, too, was working on a successor to the original Mini. Its first concept was the ACV30 which was unveiled at the 1997 Monte Carlo Rally. The name was partially an acronym of Anniversary Concept Vehicle, whilst the '30' represented the 30 years that had passed since a Mini first won the Monte Carlo Rally. The vehicle itself was a two-door coupe powered by a rear-mounted MG F engine.

Just months later, Rover released another concept, this time, a pair of vehicles called Spiritual and Spiritual Too. These vehicles were a more realistic attempt to create a modern Mini, and coincided with BMW's official creation of the Mini project. Although the two-door and four-door pair wore Mini badges, both vehicles remained purely concepts.

In 1998, BMW set out on creating the production Mini. The first aspect that was considered was the design, which was chosen from 15 full-sized design studies. Five of these designs came from BMW Germany, another five from BMW Designworks in California, four from Rover and one from an outside studio in Italy. The chosen design was from BMW Designworks and was designed by American designer, Frank Stephenson. Stephenson penned the new Mini One R50 and Mini Cooper leading the team which developed the E50 car in Munich (parallel development in England by the team at Rover having been dropped in 1995). This design, being a city car, also fitted into BMW's plan of two compact cars, leaving the supermini class for the BMW 1 Series. After the launch of the new Mini, Stephenson told automotive magazine Autocar:

We wanted the first impression when you walk up to the car to be "it could only be a Mini"

— Frank Stephenson

=== 2000 to present ===
Advertising at the launch of the new Mini in Leeds in 2001.

The last Mark VII Mini, and the 5,387,862nd and final original two-door Mini to be produced, a red Cooper Sport, was built at the Longbridge plant in October 2000. The car was driven off the production line by the pop singer Lulu, and was subsequently housed at the Heritage Motor Centre in Gaydon, alongside the first Mini Mark I ever made. The new generation Mini Hatch/Hardtop went on sale in July 2001 and was an immediate sales success.

In February 2005, BMW announced an investment of £100 million in the Mini plant in Oxford, United Kingdom, creating 200 new jobs and enabling production output to be increased by 20%.

In April 2013, Peter Schwarzenbauer became new Mini's managing director, succeeding Jochen Goller. At the North American International Auto Show in January 2011, BMW announced that it would be extending the Mini range with the launch of two new two-door sports crossover vehicles based on the Mini Paceman concept car, with a coupe version planned to enter production in 2011 and a roadster to follow in 2012. In June 2011, BMW announced an investment of £500 million in the UK over the subsequent three years as part of an expansion of the Mini range to seven models.

In July 2017, BMW announced that an electric Mini model would be built at the Cowley plant in Oxford, starting in 2019. It would also be produced in China. On 1 April 2019, BMW named Bernd Körber as director of the Mini brand, replacing Schwarzenbauer.

In Sep 2023, BMW announced plans to invest hundreds of millions of pounds to prepare the Cowley factory to build a new generation of electric cars, but in 2025 the plan was paused.

== List of CEOs ==
Current Jean-Philipe Parain (since 1 October 2025)

=== Previous CEOs ===
- Jochen Goller (2010–2013)
- Peter Schwarzenbauer (2013–2015)
- Sebastian Mackensen (2015–2018)
- Bernd Körber (2019–2022)
- Stefanie Wurst (2022–2024)
- Stefan Richmann (2024–2025)

== Current models ==
Model	Calendar year introduced
Mini Cooper Electric	2023
Mini Countryman	2023
Mini Countryman Electric	2023
Mini Aceman	2024
Mini Cooper 3-door	2024
Mini Cooper 5-door	2024
Mini Cabrio	2024

== Former models ==
=== BMC/BL/Rover models (1959 to 2000) ===
==== Mini Mark I (1959 to 1967) ====
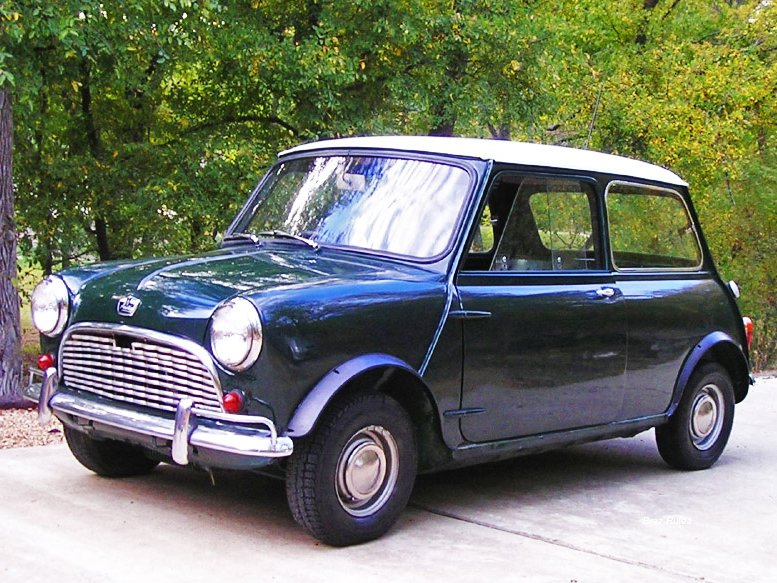
A 1963 Austin Mini Super-Deluxe

Launched in August 1959, the Mark 1 Mini (code name ADO 15) was initially marketed as the Austin Seven and Morris Mini-Minor.

Mark I Minis can be identified by exterior door hinges, sliding door glass, tail lights smaller than later cars and a "mustache" grille. In 1960, a 2-seater van was launched, along with an estate, both sharing a longer wheelbase. In 1961 the pickup was introduced, also based on the longer wheelbase.

The A-series engine came in a wide range of capacities, initially as an 848 cc, but later the 997, 998, 1071 and 1275 cc engines were added. The non-Cooper cars had gearboxes with the "magic wand" selector, with 4-speeds (no synchromesh on 1st) while the Coopers has a remote shift selector. An automatic, 4-speed transmission was introduced in 1965.

==== Mini Mark II (1967 to 1970) ====
The Mini received some minor modifications in 1967 as sold as the Austin or Morris Mini in most markets.

==== Mini Marks III–VII (1969 to 2000) ====
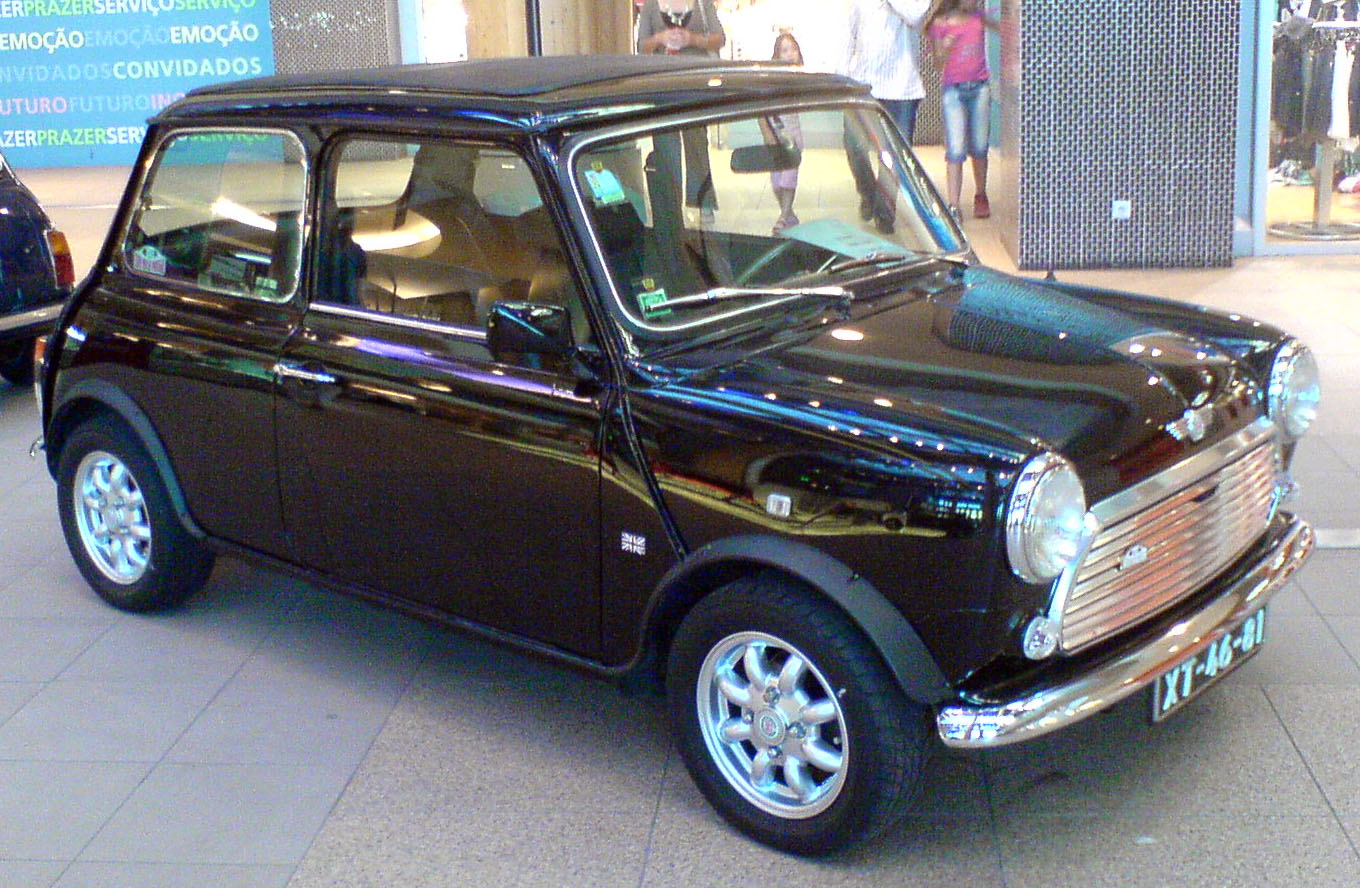
A Mark VI Mini, in production from 1990 to 1995.

The Mark III Mini was launched in 1969, which was an updated version of Mark II with a modified bodyshell. The most visible changes were larger doors with concealed hinges. The boot lid lost the original hinged number plate and its recess shape and a large rear colour-coded lamp was fitted in its place, along with larger rear side windows. Sliding windows were replaced with winding windows—although some Australian-manufactured Mark I Minis had adopted this feature in 1965 (with opening quarterlight windows). The suspension reverted from Hydrolastic to rubber cones. as a cost-saving measure. Production at the Cowley plant was ended, and the simple name "Mini" completely replaced the separate Austin and Morris marques.

The Mark IV, launched in 1976, introduced a front rubber mounted subframe with single tower bolts and larger bushes in the rear frame. In addition twin stalk indicators were introduced with larger foot pedals, and from 1977 onwards the rear indicator lamps had the reverse lights incorporated in them.

The Mark V, launched in 1984, introduced 8.4-inch (210 mm) brake discs and plastic wheel arches (mini special arches) but retained the same Mark IV body shell shape.

For the Mark VI, launched in 1990, the engine mounting points were moved forward to take 1,275 cc power units, and includes the HIF carburettor version, plus the single point fuel injected car which came out in 1991. The 998 cc power units were discontinued. Internal bonnet release were fitted from 1992.

The Mark VII, launched in 1996, was the final version of the original two-door Mini. For this model twin point injection with front-mounted radiator was introduced, along with a full-width dashboard and driver's side airbag.

=== BMW models (2001 to date) ===
==== Mini Hatch/Hardtop (2001 to 2006) ====
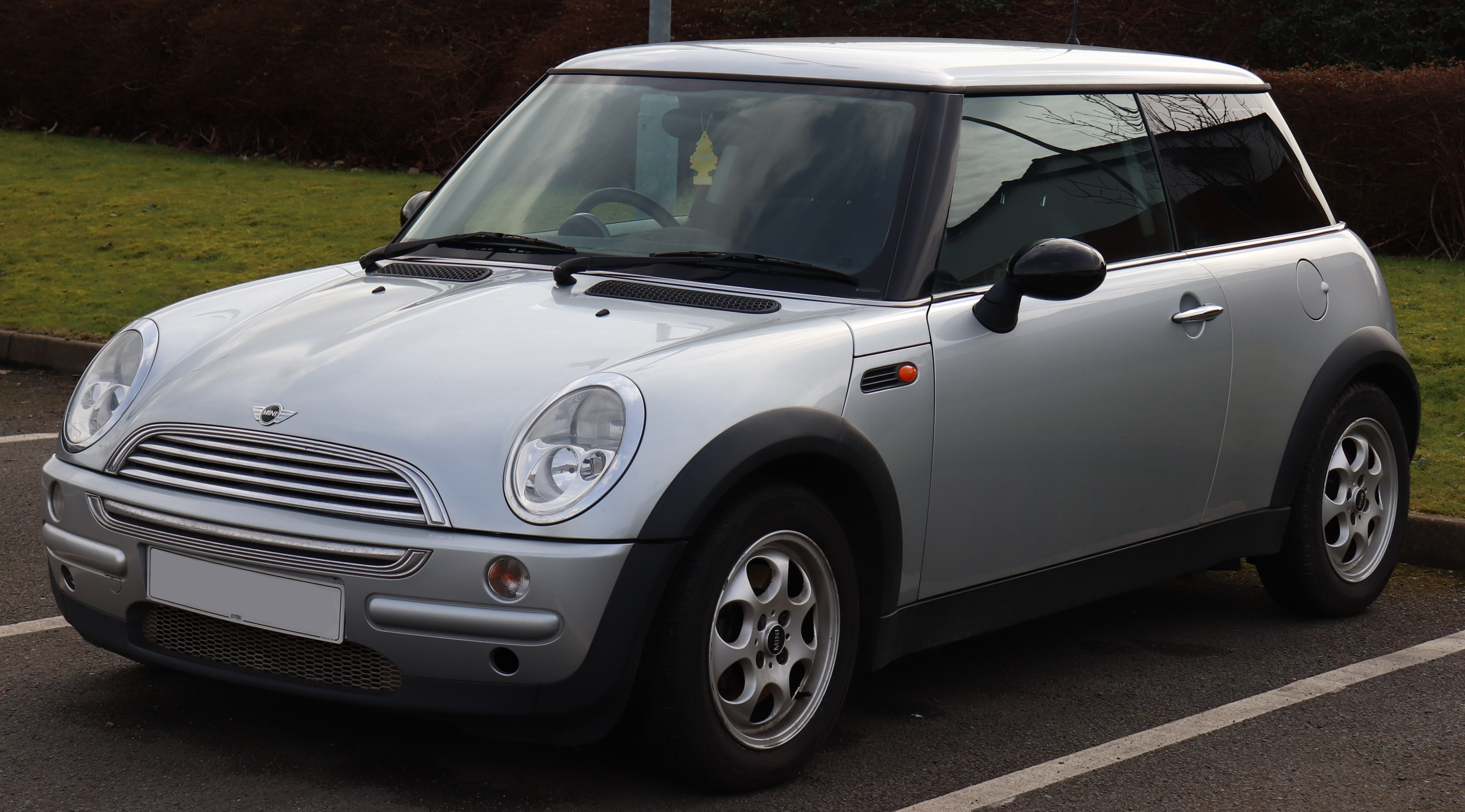
A 2004 Mini One Hatch (pre-facelift model)

All Mini models since 2001 have different variants, including One (entry-level), Cooper, Cooper S (sporty), and John Cooper Works (JCW) (high-end).

The hatchback/hardtop Mini was the first model of the new generation Mini, introduced in 2001, and was back then known as simply Mini. It was available in Cooper, Cooper S and One variations at launch. In many European markets, the Mini One was powered by a 1.4-litre I4 version of the Tritec engine but all other petrol powered Minis used the 1.6-litre I4 version. The Cooper S and JCW models included a supercharger intake system. This generation of minis was the only production model to have one, replaced by a turbocharger from the second generation onwards.

The names Cooper and Cooper S followed the names used for the sportier version of the classic Mini, which in turn come from the involvement of John Cooper and the Cooper Car Company. The Cooper heritage was further emphasised with the John Cooper Works (JCW) range of tuning options that are available with the Mini. John Cooper also created a one-off racing model of the Mini Cooper S named the Mini Cooper S Works. This car featured many extras which help to improve performance, such as a racing exhaust and air filter as well as uprated suspension. The car also had one-of-a-kind 17-inch (430 mm) racing wheels.

The Mk I Mini One, Cooper and Cooper S used some version of the reliable, Brazilian-built Tritec engine, co-developed by Chrysler & BMW; the Mini One D used a Toyota-built 1ND-TV diesel engine. In August 2006, BMW announced that future engines would be built in the UK, making the car essentially British-built again; final assembly took place at Oxford, and the body pressings were made in nearby Swindon at BMW's Swindon Pressings Ltd subsidiary.

The last Mk I variant was the Mini Cooper S with John Cooper Works GP Kit: a light-weight, quasi-race-prepped John Cooper Works model. Hand-finished by Bertone in Italy, it was offered as a limited-production run of 2,000 cars during the 2006 model year, with 444 of those originally intended for the UK market (although ultimately, 459 were sold).

==== Mini Convertible/Cabrio (2005 to 2008) ====
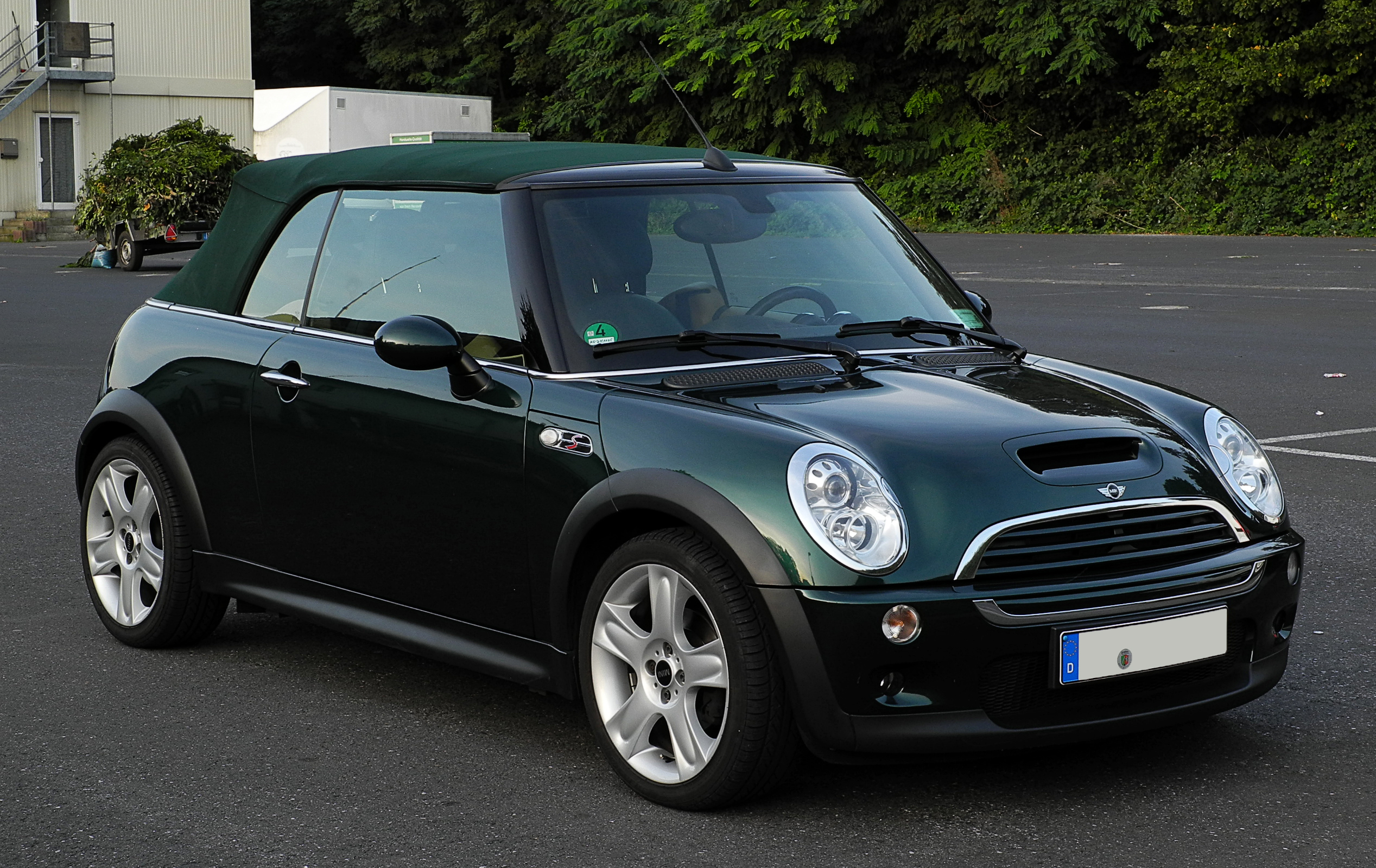
A 2006 Mini Cooper S Convertible

At the 2004 Salon International de l'Auto, Mini introduced a convertible model which was released in the 2005 model year and available in One, Cooper and Cooper S trim versions.

The convertible roof is fully automatic—an unusual feature in such a small car—and can be opened partially to act as a sunroof whilst the car is driving at speed. The convertible model forsakes the rear hatchback of the Hardtop Mini, replacing it with a drop down 'tailgate' that is reminiscent of the classic Mini—it incorporates similarly prominent external hinges, and with the roof in the closed position, the rear roof section and luggage shelf can be raised with two handles, semi-tailgate style, to access the luggage space easier. The convertible also adds two small power windows for the rear seat passengers which are lowered automatically when the roof opens. The roof is made from a heavy cloth, with many layers of insulation; the rear window is glass with an integral heater/defroster, but no washer or wiper.

At the 2007 North American International Auto Show, Mini introduced the limited edition Mini Cooper S Sidewalk Convertible. It had a top speed of 215 km/h (134 mph) and accelerates from 0 to 100 kilometres per hour (0 to 62 mph) in 7.9 seconds. The engine provides 168 hp (125 kW) and 220 N⋅m (160 lbf⋅ft) of torque.

==== Mini Hatch/Hardtop (2007 to 2014) ====
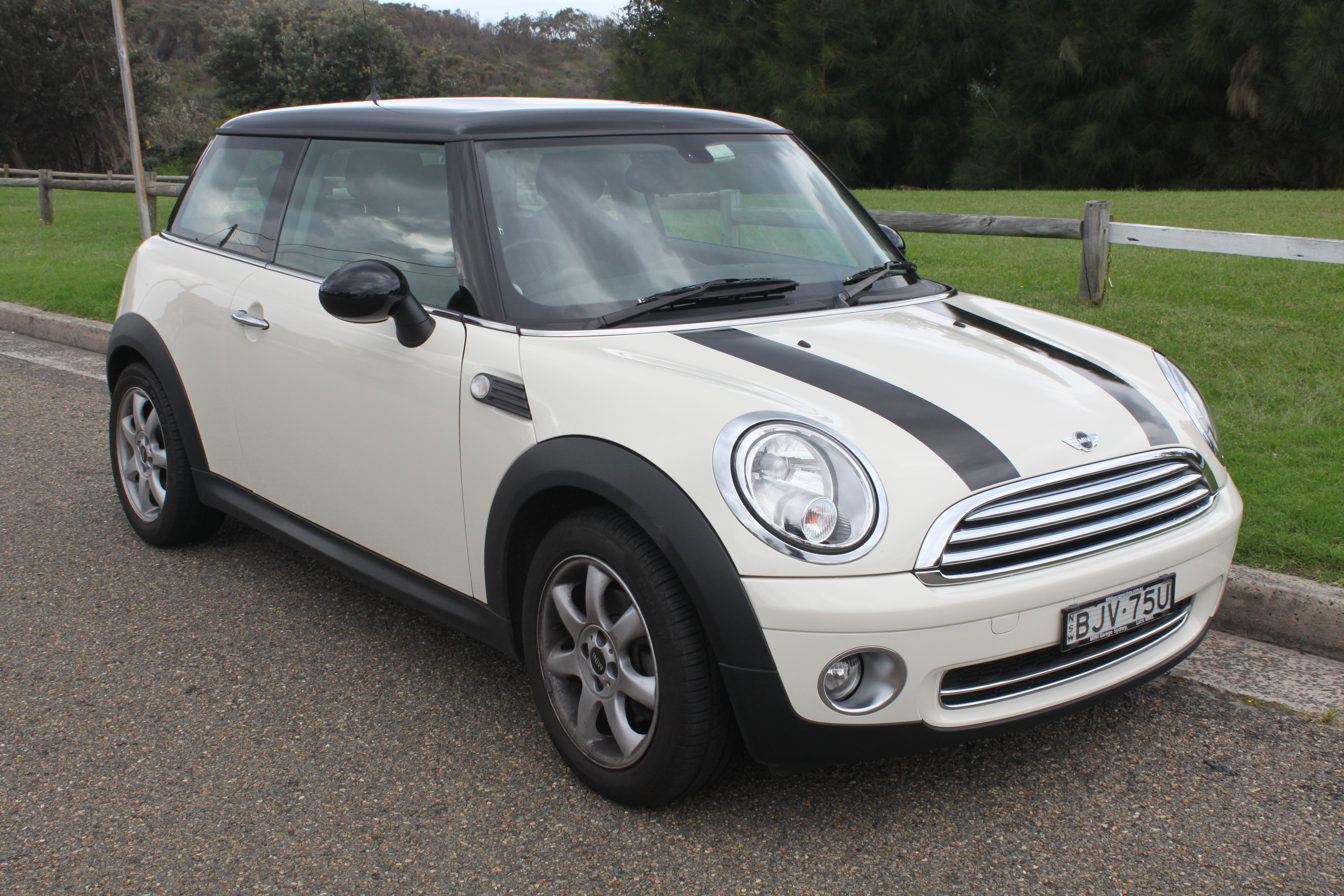
A 2009 Mini Cooper Hatch.

Mini introduced an all-new second generation of the Hardtop/Hatch model in November 2006, on a re-engineered platform incorporating many stylistic and engineering changes. It utilises the Prince engine, the architecture of which is shared with PSA Peugeot Citroën and is designed to be more cost-effective and fuel-efficient, and is manufactured at the BMW Hams Hall engine plant in Warwickshire, United Kingdom. The development and engineering was done in Munich, Germany at BMW Group headquarters, and by external third parties. Although the new model looks very similar to its predecessor, every panel was different and new safety requirements resulted in the overall length increasing by 60 mm (2.4 in).

The second generation Mini was introduced in the Cooper and Cooper S trim levels; the range was added to in 2007 with the Mini One. For the first time, there was a diesel-powered Cooper, available from April 2007, and badged as the Cooper D, which was supplemented in January 2011 with a new 2.0 L diesel for the automatic Cooper and high performance Cooper SD. The Convertible and Clubman versions followed later. In 2009, the Mini First trim level was launched in the UK, which is a low-end, petrol-only version, with less power and a lower speed. The Mini John Cooper Works Challenge is a purpose-built race car, based on the Mini Hatch, and manufactured in the BMW Motorsport factory located in Munich. It was unveiled in 2007 at the IAA Motor Show. In 2009 a John Cooper Works World Championship 50 special edition was unveiled in 2009 Mini United Festival in Silverstone.

==== Mini Clubman (2008 to 2014) ====
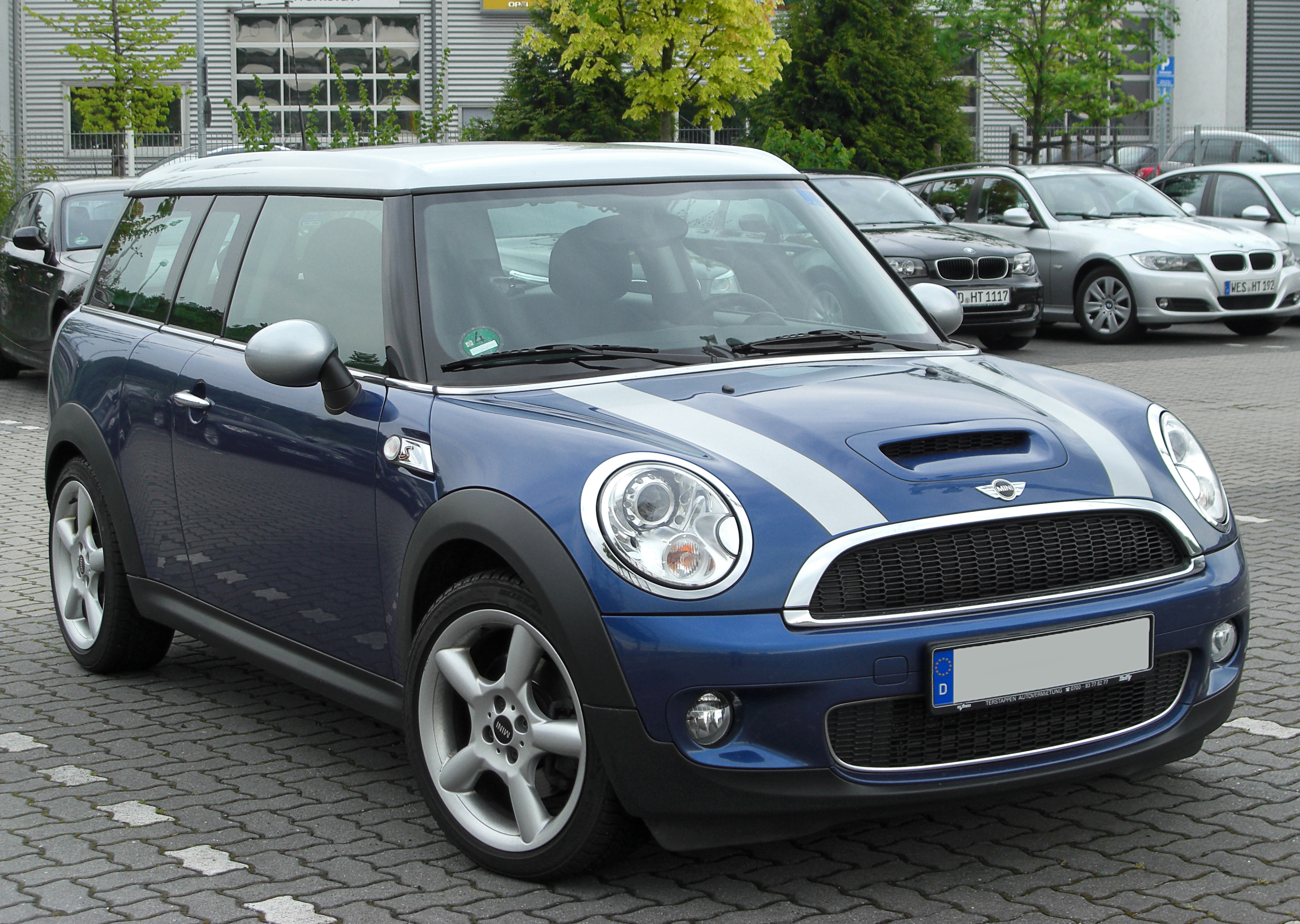
A Mini Cooper S Clubman

The Mini Clubman is an estate Mini, introduced for the 2008 model year and available in One, Cooper, Cooper S, and Cooper D variations. While identical to the Hatch/Hardtop from the B-pillars forward, the Clubman is 240 mm (9.4 in) longer overall, with a correspondingly stretched wheelbase that is 80 mm (3.1 in) longer; this provides more rear-seat leg room and substantially increased cargo space when compared to the Hardtop—160 mm (6.3 in) longer, giving 260 litres (9.2 cubic feet) of space. It has twin "barn doors," alternately referred to as "the Splitdoor," enclosing the boot instead of a pull-up hatch, and also features a "Clubdoor" on the right-hand side regardless of the intended market. This means that in right-hand drive markets, the rear door is on the road side of the car, requiring rear passengers to exit into the road. Engine and transmission selections are identical to those used in the Hatch/Hardtop model, except the 66 kW (90 PS; 89 hp) One Diesel; and the rear suspension set-up shares many of the same designs features including the rear trailing arms and the anti-roll bars.

The use of the name "Clubman" for the Mini estate van was a break with classic Mini tradition. "Clubman" was originally the name given to the 1970s face-lift of the classic Mini, which mostly resulted in a squared-off front end, whereas the classic Mini estates had traditionally been named "Traveller" or "Countryman". However, BMW did not initially purchase the rights to use those names.

==== Mini Convertible (2009 to 2015) ====
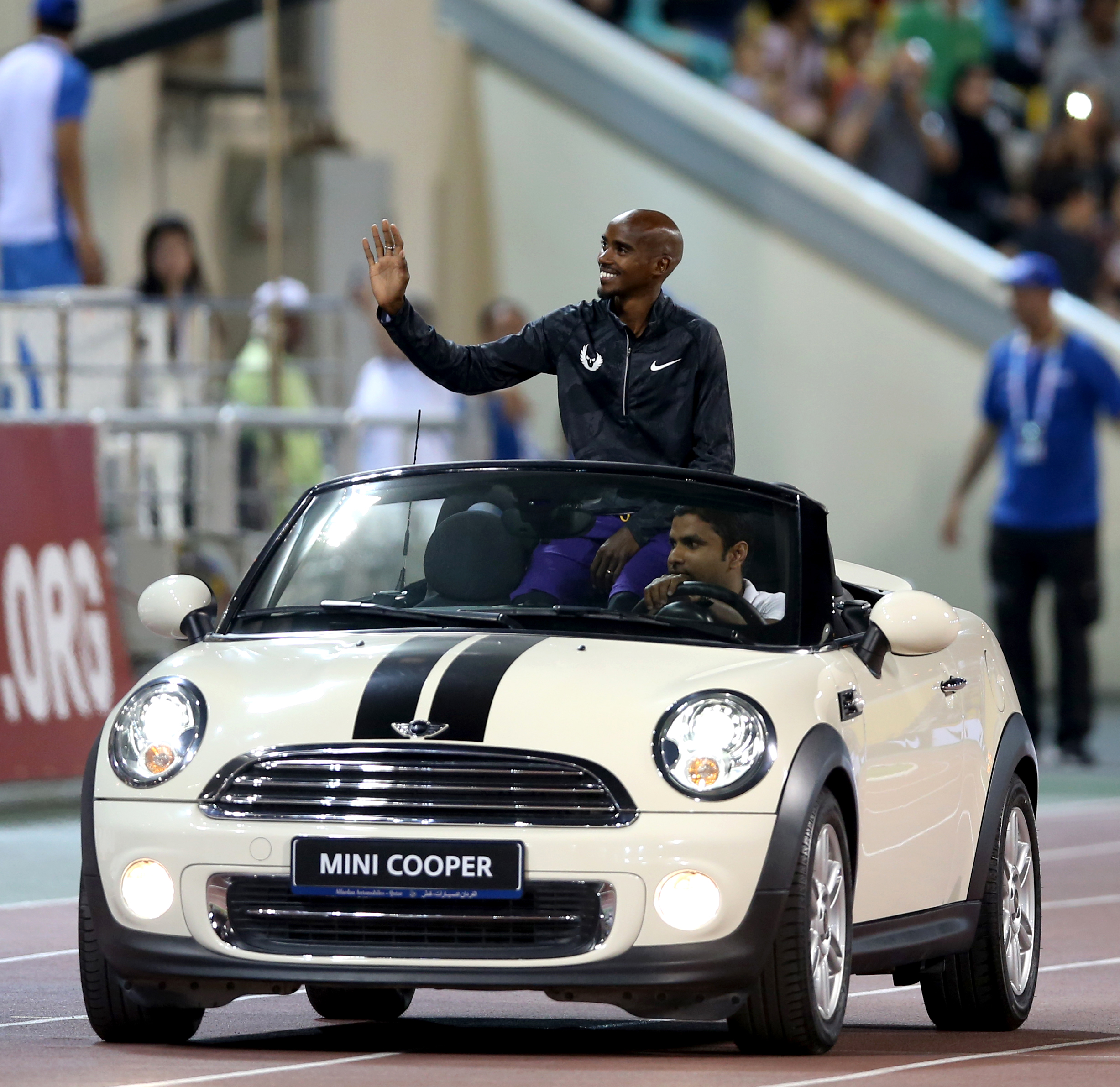
Athlete Mo Farah in a Mini Convertible at the Doha Diamond League

The second generation Mini Convertible was unveiled at the 2009 Detroit Auto Show and the 2009 Geneva International Motor Show as a 2009 model-year vehicle (first available for sale on 28 March 2009). A device, marketed as the "Openometer", records the number of minutes the vehicle has operated with its roof retracted. Available variants and corresponding powertrain selections are the same as in the Mini Hatch range, including the diesel engine in some markets.

==== Mini Countryman (2011 to 2016) ====
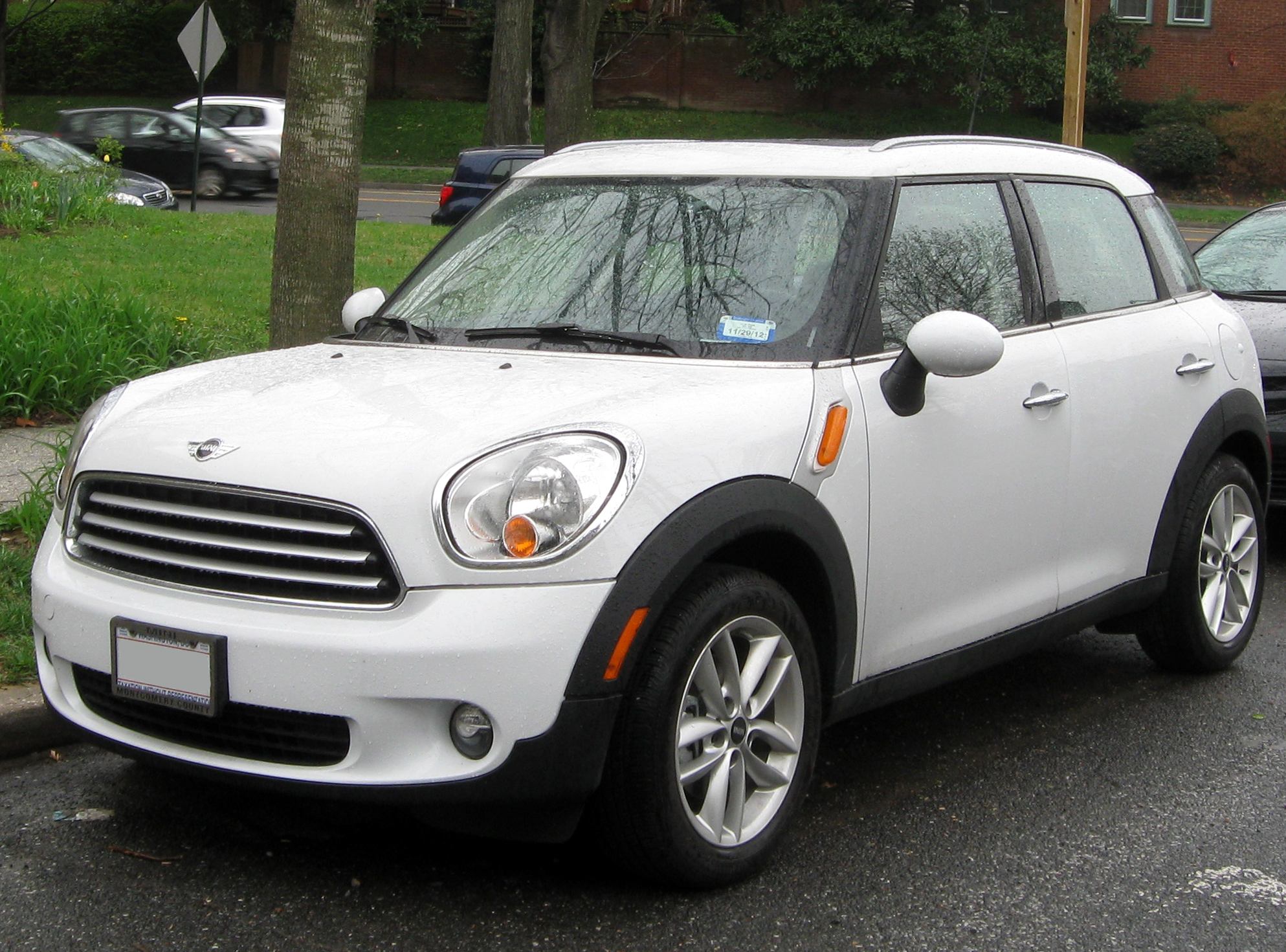
Mini Countryman

The Mini Countryman was announced in January 2010, and formally launched at the 2010 Geneva Motor Show. It is the first Mini crossover SUV, and the first five-door model to be launched in the BMW-era. It is offered with a choice of two- or four-wheel drive (known as ALL4), and with 1.6 L petrol or diesel and 2.0 L diesel four-cylinder engines in various states of tune. Sales started in September 2010 as a 2011 model-year vehicle.

The Countryman has a longer wheelbase, more interior room, and higher ground clearance than the Clubman. It uses the same engines as the Hatch/Clubman range, but with an optional all-wheel-drive powertrain (dubbed "ALL4") to allow minimal off-road and rugged terrain driving. A six-speed manual transmission is standard on all models, with automatic transmission available on all petrol and diesel models except the 90 bhp One D.

==== Mini Coupé (2012 to 2015) ====
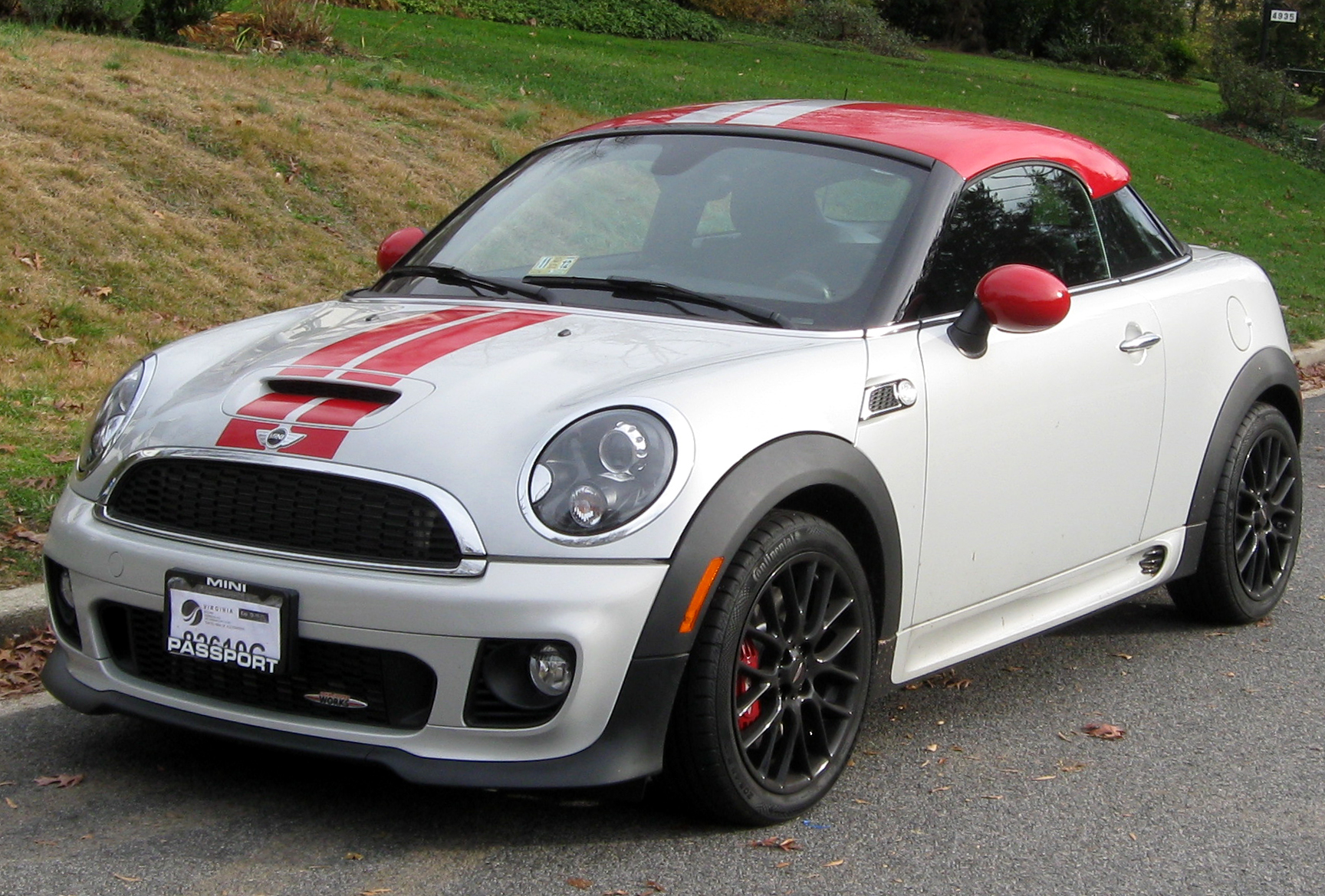
Mini John Cooper Works Coupé

Mini revealed the Coupé in June 2011. It is the first two-seat Mini and the first to have a three-box design; the engine compartment, the passenger compartment and the luggage compartments are all separated. It will also be the fastest production Mini ever: in John Cooper Works trim, it does 0 to 62 mph (0 to 100 km/h) in 6.4 seconds and goes on to a top speed of 149 mph (240 km/h) as it is powered by a turbocharged 208 hp (155 kW) 1,598 cc four-cylinder.

==== Mini Roadster (2012 to 2015) ====
The Mini Roadster was first shown at the Frankfurt Motor Show in September 2009 and is the convertible version of the Mini Coupe. The Roadster is available in three trim levels: Cooper, Cooper S, and John Cooper Works.

==== Mini Paceman (2013 to 2016) ====
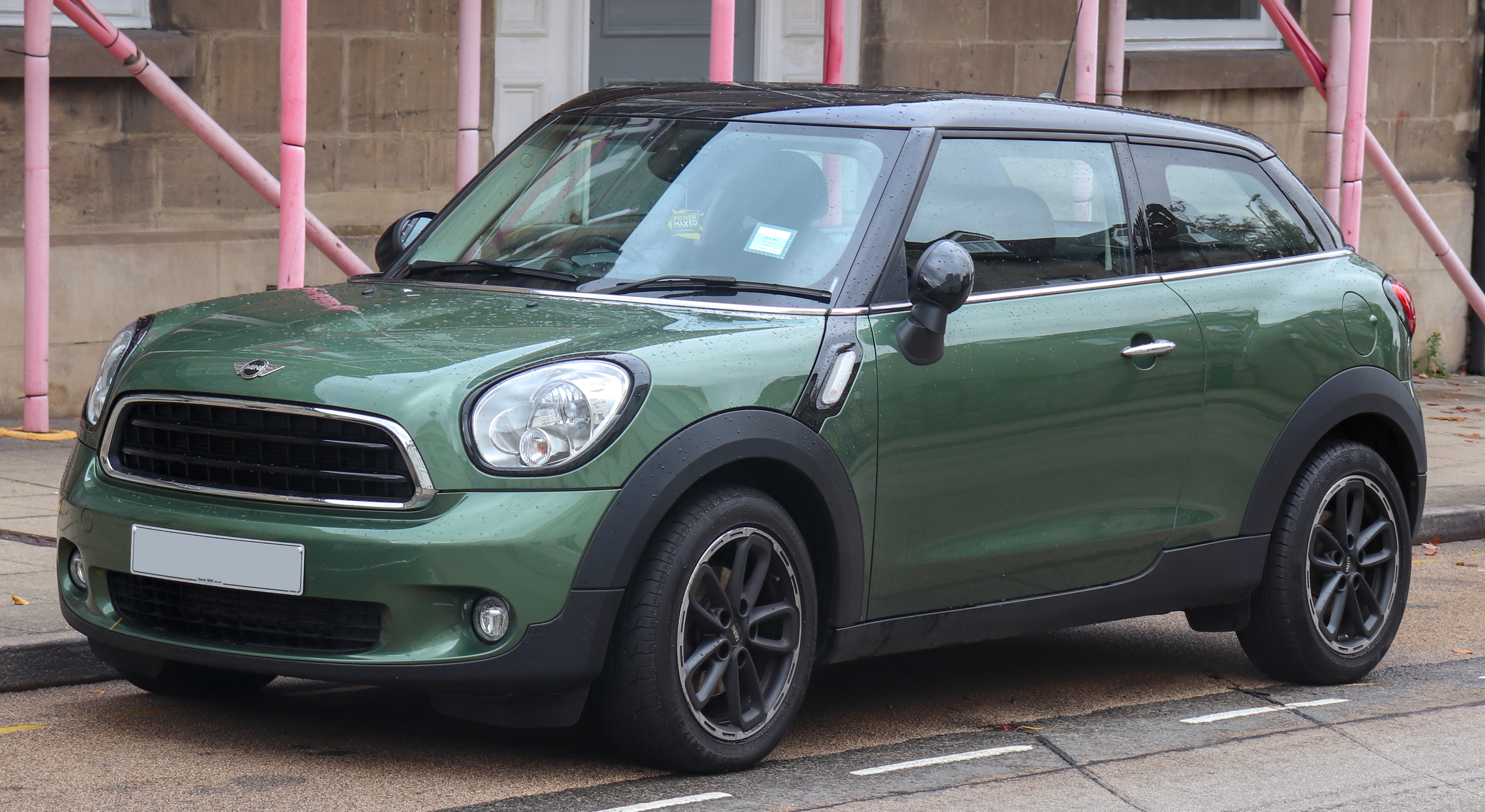
A Mini Paceman Cooper

The Mini Paceman three-door crossover version of the Countryman debuted as a concept car at the 2011 Detroit Auto Show. On 5 July 2012, senior vice president of Mini brand management, Dr. Kay Segler, announced that, "the Mini Paceman is the official name of the brand's seventh model, which will be launched next year (2013) in the US" The production version was launched at the 2012 Paris Motor Show, with sales starting in most international markets by the second quarter of 2013.

==== Mini Hatch/Hardtop (2014 to 2024) ====
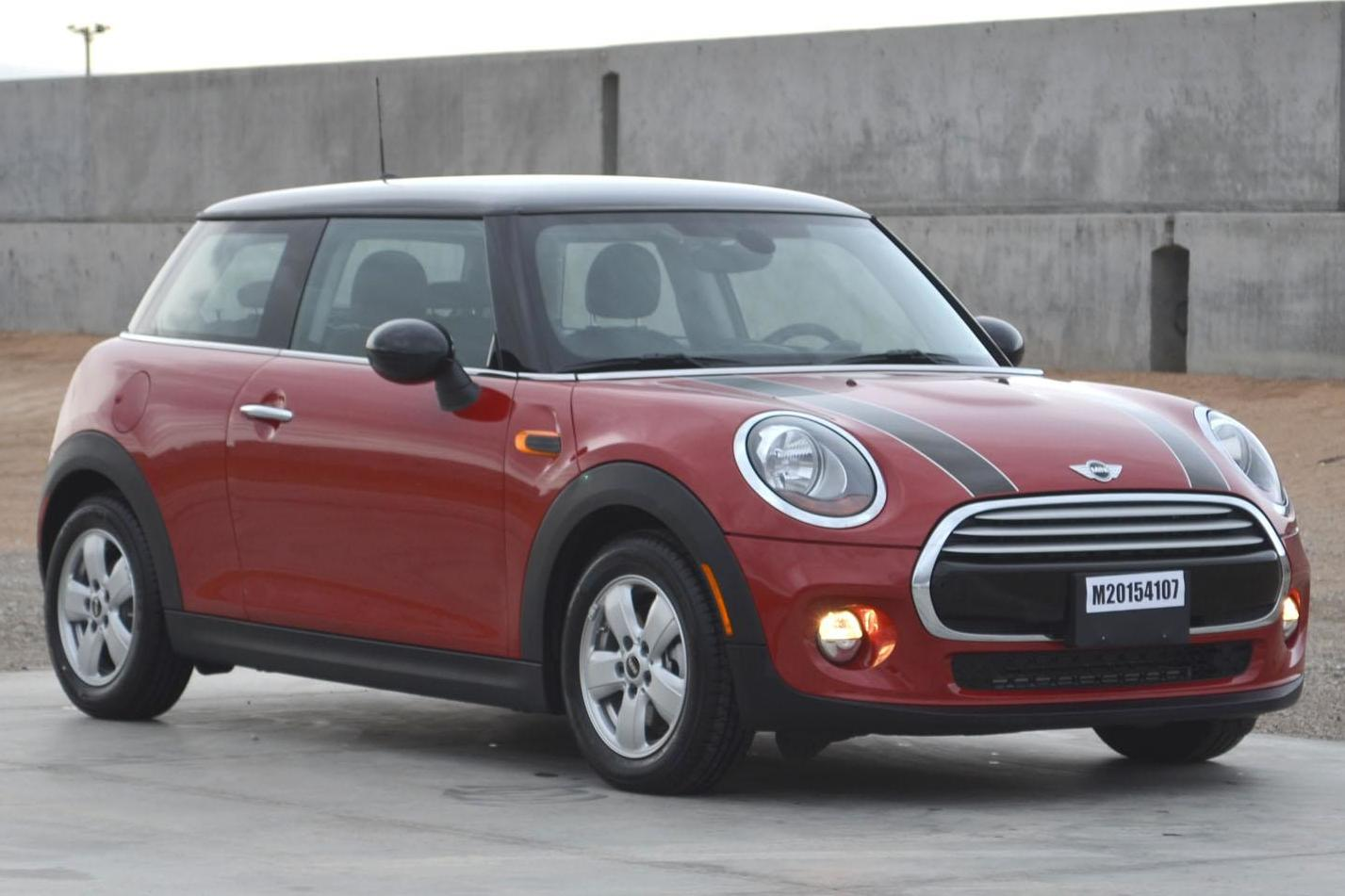
3rd generation Mini hatchback

The third generation Mini was unveiled by BMW in November 2013, with sales starting in the first half of 2014. The new car is 98 mm longer, 44 mm wider, and 7 mm taller than the outgoing model, with a 28 mm longer wheelbase and an increase in track width (+42 mm front and +34 mm rear). The increase in size results in a larger interior and a boot volume increase to 211 litres.

== Technical information ==
=== Engine summary ===
Model	Years	Type	Power, torque @ rpm
Petrol engines
First	2009–2010	1,397 cc (1.4 L; 85.3 cu in) I4	75 PS (55 kW; 74 hp) @ 4,500, 120 N⋅m (89 lb⋅ft) @ 2,500
One	2007–2010	1,397 cc (1.4 L; 85.3 cu in) I4	95 PS (70 kW; 94 hp) @ 6,000, 140 N⋅m (103 lb⋅ft) @ 4,000
First	2010—	1,598 cc (1.6 L; 97.5 cu in) I4	75 PS (55 kW; 74 hp) @ 6,000, 140 N⋅m (103 lb⋅ft) @ 2,250
One	2010—	1,598 cc (1.6 L; 97.5 cu in) I4	98 PS (72 kW; 97 hp) @ 6,000, 153 N⋅m (113 lb⋅ft) @ 3,000
Cooper Hardtop; Cooper Clubman; Cooper Convertible	2007–2010; 2008–2010; 2009–2010	1,598 cc (1.6 L; 97.5 cu in) I4	120 PS (88 kW; 118 hp) @ 6,000, 160 N⋅m (120 lb⋅ft) @ 4,250
Cooper (all body styles)	2010—	1,598 cc (1.6 L; 97.5 cu in) I4	122 PS (90 kW; 120 hp) @ 6,000, 160 N⋅m (118 lb⋅ft) @ 4,250
Cooper S Hardtop; Cooper S Clubman; Cooper S Convertible	2007— 2008— 2009—	1,598 cc (1.6 L; 97.5 cu in) I4 turbo	175 PS (129 kW; 173 hp) @ 5,500, 240 N⋅m (177 lb⋅ft) @ 1,600–5,000 Overboost: 260 N⋅m (192 lb⋅ft) @ 1,700–4,500
Cooper S (all body styles)	2010—	1,598 cc (1.6 L; 97.5 cu in) I4 turbo	184 PS (135 kW; 181 hp) @ 5,500, 240 N⋅m (177 lb⋅ft) @ 1,600–5,000 Overboost: 260 N⋅m (192 lb⋅ft) @ 1,700–4,500
John Cooper Works CHALLENGE; John Cooper Works (all body styles)	2008— 2009—	1,598 cc (1.6 L; 97.5 cu in) I4 turbo	211 PS (155 kW; 208 hp) @ 6,000, 261 N⋅m (193 lb⋅ft) @ 1,850–5,600 Overboost: 279 N⋅m (206 lb⋅ft) @ 2,000
Diesel engines
One D	2007–2009	1,364 cc (1.4 L; 83.2 cu in) I4 turbo	88 PS (65 kW; 87 hp) @ 4,000, 190 N⋅m (140 lb⋅ft) @ 1,750
One D	2009–2010	1,560 cc (1.6 L; 95.2 cu in) I4 turbo	90 PS (66 kW; 89 hp) @ 4,000
Cooper D	2008–2010	1,560 cc (1.6 L; 95.2 cu in) I4 turbo	110 PS (81 kW; 108 hp) @ 4,000, 240 N⋅m (177 lb⋅ft) @ 1,750–2,000 Overboost: 260 N⋅m (190 lb⋅ft)
One D	2010—	1,598 cc (1.6 L; 97.5 cu in) I4 turbo	90 PS (66 kW; 89 hp) @ 4,000, 215 N⋅m (159 lb⋅ft) @ 1,750–2,500
Cooper D	2010—	1,598 cc (1.6 L; 97.5 cu in) I4 turbo	112 PS (82 kW; 110 hp) @ 4,000, 270 N⋅m (199 lb⋅ft) @ 1,750–2,250
Cooper SD	2011—	1,995 cc (2.0 L; 121.7 cu in) I4 turbo	143 PS (105 kW; 141 hp) @ 4,000, 305 N⋅m (225 lb⋅ft) @ 1,750–2,700
Electric motors
E	2009—	AC Propulsion 13000 rpm motor, 100A @ 13.5 V power supply	204 PS (150 kW; 201 hp) @ 6,000–12,000, 225 N⋅m (166 lb⋅ft) @ 0–5,000 Regeneration: 115 N⋅m (85 lb⋅ft); Continuous: 68 PS (50 kW; 67 hp)

=== Internal designations ===
The original Mini was designated ADO 15, the 15th model developed by the Austin Drawing Office. ADO 20 is the code name to the Mini Mark III. The 1961 Cooper was referred to code ADO 50.

Until 2013, all Rover and BMW era Mini models have R-series model numbers assigned to them, a legacy of the Mini's original development within Rover Group. Future models will have an F-series model number. The following designations are known:

- R50: "Mk I" Mini One & Cooper (2001–2006)
- R52: "Mk I" Mini Convertible (2004–2008)
- R53: "Mk I" Mini Cooper S (2001–2006)
- R55: "Mk II" Mini Clubman (2007–2014)
- R56: "Mk II" Mini Hatch/Hardtop range (2006–2013)
- R57: "Mk II" Mini Convertible (2009–2015)
- R58: Coupé (2012–2015)
- R59: Roadster (2012–2015)
- R60: Countryman (2010–2016)
- R61: Paceman (2013–2016)
- F54: Mini Clubman (2015–2024)
- F56: "Mk III" Mini Hatch/Hardtop (2014–2024)
- F55: "Mk III" 5-door Hatch (2015–2024)
- F57: "Mk III" Mini Convertible (2015–2024)
- F60: Countryman (2017–2023)
- J01: Cooper E/SE (2023–)
- U25: Countryman (2023–)
- F66: "Mk IV" Mini Hatch/Hardtop (2024–)
- F65: "Mk IV" 5-door Hatch (2024–)
- F67: "Mk IV" Mini Convertible (2024–)
- J05: Aceman (2024–)

=== Body type summary in UK ===
Chassis codes	R55	R56	R57	R60	R61
Body styles	Clubman	Hardtop	Convertible	Countryman	Paceman
Trim level	Years				
First	–	2009—	–	–	–
One	–	2007—	–	–	–
Cooper	2008—	2007—	2009—	2011—	2013–
Cooper S	2008—	2007—	2009—	2011—	2013–
John Cooper Works	2009—	2009—	2009—	2013—	2013–
John Cooper Works Challenge	–	2008—	–	–	–
Cooper D	2008—	2008—	2010—	2013—	–
E	–	2009	–	–	–

== Development and production ==
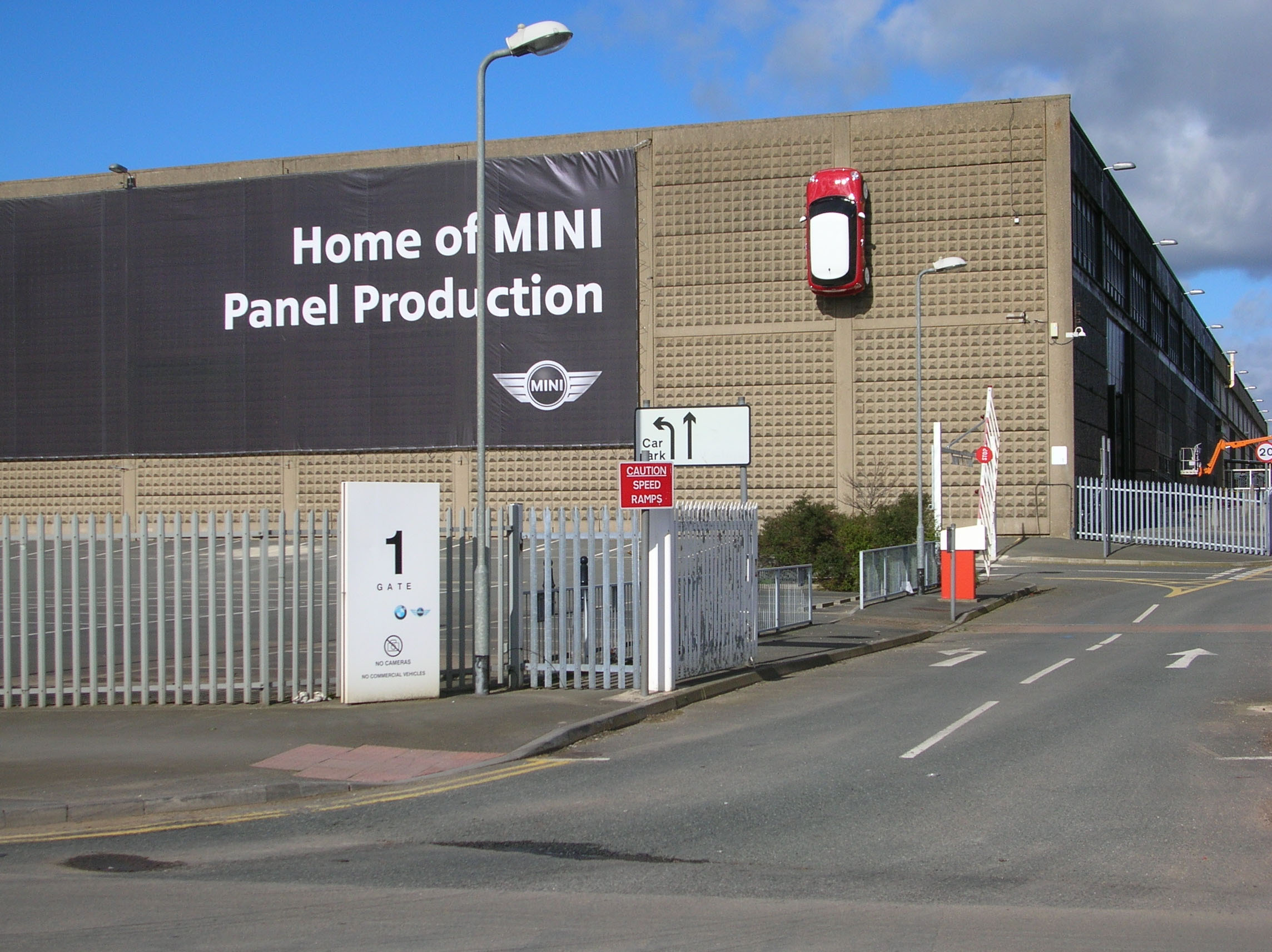
Plant Swindon, the main production site for Mini body pressings and sub-assemblies

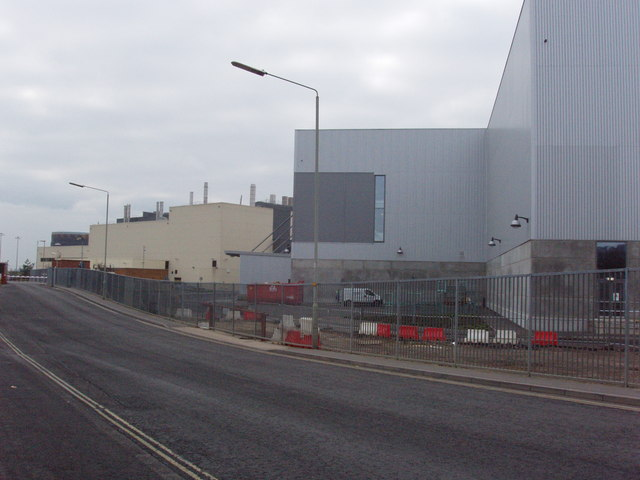
Plant Oxford in Cowley, Oxford, England, the main assembly plant for the Mini range.

Before BMW's ownership, the traditional Mini had been at the Longbridge plant located next to the headquarters of Rover until the sale of the company by BMW in March 2000. In the selling of Rover by BMW to Phoenix Venture Holdings, the Longbridge plant was included in the sales contract.

In time, production was rationalised to just Longbridge and so this was where the last of the cars were made, making Longbridge the "natural home" for the new Mini prior to BMW splitting up the company. However, as a result of the change of ownership, BMW redeveloped the entire Cowley plant, demolishing much of the factory, to create a new factory and renamed this "Plant Oxford", on the site of what was historically the Pressed Steel Company's Cowley Body Plant and next door to what was historically the Morris factory.

Since 2006, Plant Hams Hall produces the new Mini petrol engines, Plant Oxford is responsible for the body shell production, paint and assembly, and Plant Swindon produces body pressings and sub-assemblies, creating the "Mini Production Triangle". Mini claim that 60% of components of the Mini Mk II come from suppliers based in the UK compared to 40% for the 2001 model. The Countryman is the first modern Mini assembled outside the UK, with the contract won by Magna Steyr in Austria.

At Plant Oxford 4,000 employees, referred to as "associates", produce up to 800 cars each day (approximately 240,000 per year). The bodyshop at Cowley holds 429 robots, assembling 425 body panels; the bodyshells are then moved to the neighbouring paint shop where paint robots apply the 14 exterior colour options and optional contrasting roof colours. Final assembly is performed at Cowley, which involves the fitting of 2,400 components to produce the numerous variants that may be ordered.

All Prince four-cylinder petrol engines for Mini and BMW are produced at the Hams Hall Plant near Birmingham, United Kingdom, which has around 800 employees. Diesel engines are manufactured by BMW's Plant Steyr in Austria, having previously been manufactured in France and England by PSA.

Mini sub-assemblies and pressings such as doors are supplied by the plant at Swindon, where 1,000 are employed and 280 pressed parts are produced using 135 welding robots. The Swindon plant was originally Swindon Pressings Ltd, founded in 1955 by the Pressed Steel Company and became a wholly owned subsidiary of the BMW Group in May 2000.

Minis are primarily developed in the United Kingdom by BMW's Development Division.

In 2013, assembly of the Countryman was expanded to three international locations: from April 2013 at BMW's plant near Chennai, India, specifically for the Indian market from June 2013 at the BMW Group Malaysia Assembly Plant in Kulim, Kedah, and at the BMW Manufacturing Thailand plant in Rayong from August 2013. Since 2014 cars have also been assembled under contract by VDL Nedcar near Maastricht in Limburg.

A Mini 5-door hatch (F55) was available for the first time in 2014. The 5-door is exclusively assembled at Plant Oxford with additional tooling for the body sides, new equipment in the wax sealing line in the plant's paint shop to accommodate the extra door and differences in the shaping of the rear of the car. Plant Swindon produces the new rear door cells in the sub-assembly line with additional roof and panel tooling in the press shop.

== Sales ==
A total of around 5.3 million of the original two-door Minis were sold, making it by far the most popular British car of all time. Thousands of these are still on the road, with the remaining pre-1980s versions being firmly established as collector's items. Deliveries of Minis has ranged from 188,077 in 2006 to 232,425 in 2008. In 2009 216,538 cars were delivered, with 69.3% being Mini Hatch/Hardtop, 13.1% Convertible models and 17.6% the Clubman variant. Over 53% were the Cooper version, with 26.2% Cooper S, and the basic One 20.2%. In 2009, the Mini was Britain's seventh best selling car—the first time that a BMW-era Mini had appeared among the nation's top 10 selling cars. It also was Britain's seventh best selling car in June 2010. Mini sales worldwide were up 22% in 2011 over 2010, with 285,000 cars delivered across the globe. In the US, the marque's largest market, 57,000 were sold in 2011, a 26% increase over 2010. The next two largest markets, the United Kingdom and Germany, saw 13% and 28% sales increases over 2010, respectively. A total of 301,526 Mini vehicles were sold worldwide in 2012. The largest national market was the United States, with 66,123 units sold, followed by the United Kingdom with 50,367. The Mini Countryman sold a total of 102,250 units in the year.

== Marketing ==
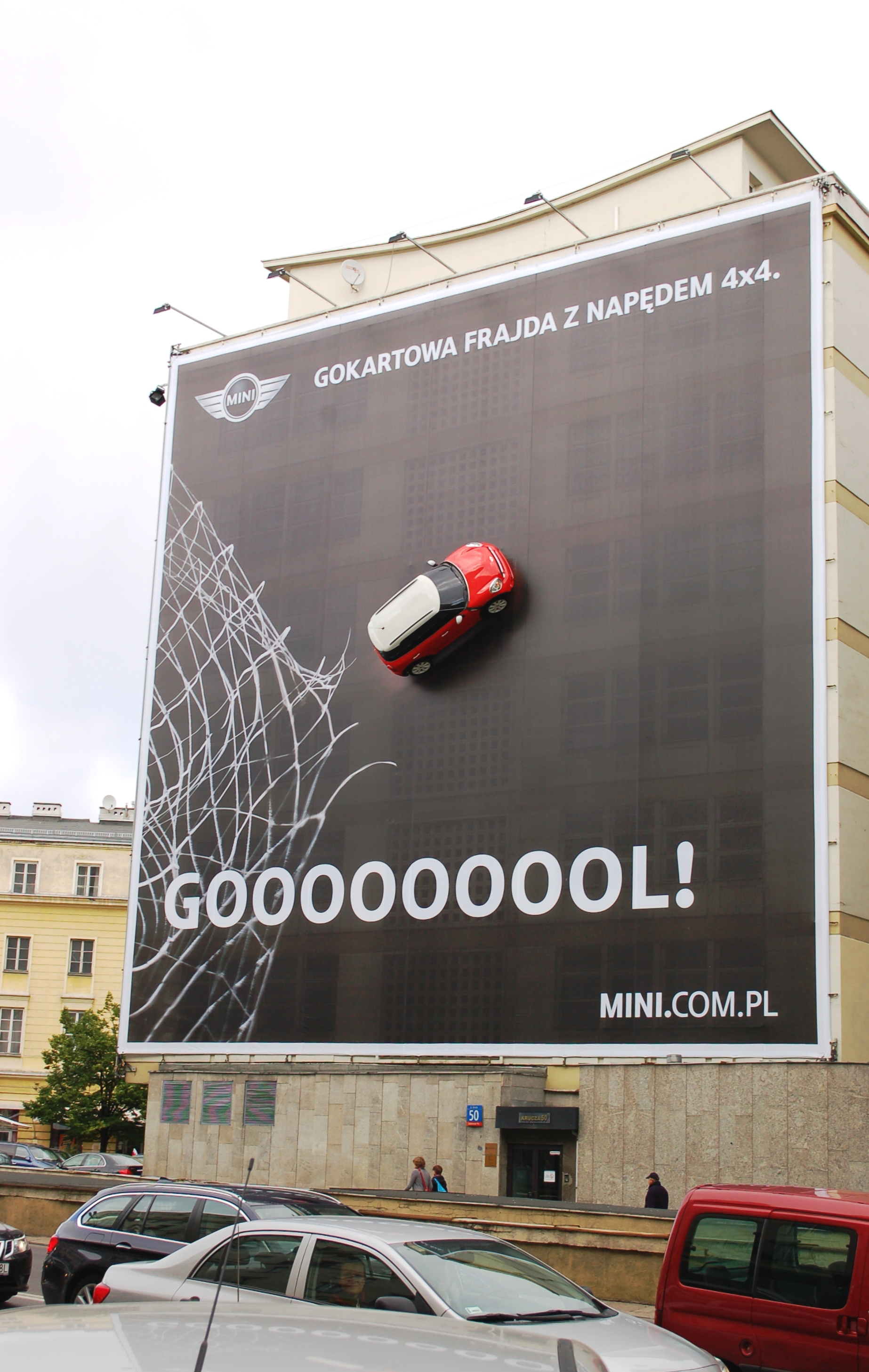
A Mini advertisement in Warsaw, Poland

Butler, Shine, Stern & Partners, Mini's advertising agency, produced a video series in 2007 called Hammer & Coop, directed by Todd Phillips as part of an ad campaign for the Mini. Crispin Porter + Bogusky, Mini's advertising agency, produced a movie called Counterfeit Mini Coopers as part of the ad campaign. To advertise Mini Clubman's 2008 introduction to the Chinese market, Beijing Mini offered a Mini Rickshaw, which uses the rear half of Mini Clubman.

== Controversy ==
It is reported that BMW was ordered by US regulators to reduce fuel economy ratings on four 2014 Mini Coopers as results from EPA testing did not match the automaker's submissions.

== Films ==
In 1969, the original British Mini was featured in the gold-heist film The Italian Job starring Michael Caine and Noël Coward.

In 2002, an original Austin Mini Mayfair MKV was featured in The Bourne Identity. In the action scene, Matt Damon's character is chased through Paris, France .

In 2003, the new MINI Cooper was shown in a remake of The Italian Job. One Chilli Red MINI was a Cooper S Hatch R53, the Electric Blue MINI was a Cooper Hatch R53, and the Pepper White MINI was also a Cooper Hatch R53. Charlize Theron's character also drives an original Rover Mini Cooper.

In 2023, ten Mini Countryman R60 are used as chase vehicles in Fast X, the tenth instalment of the Fast and Furious franchise. The film's picture car supervisor in Europe and the UK, Alex King, said he bought 10 Countrymans in the UK for the film, before modifying them to look like a proper rally car.

== Demonstration models ==
=== Mini E (2009 to 2010) ===
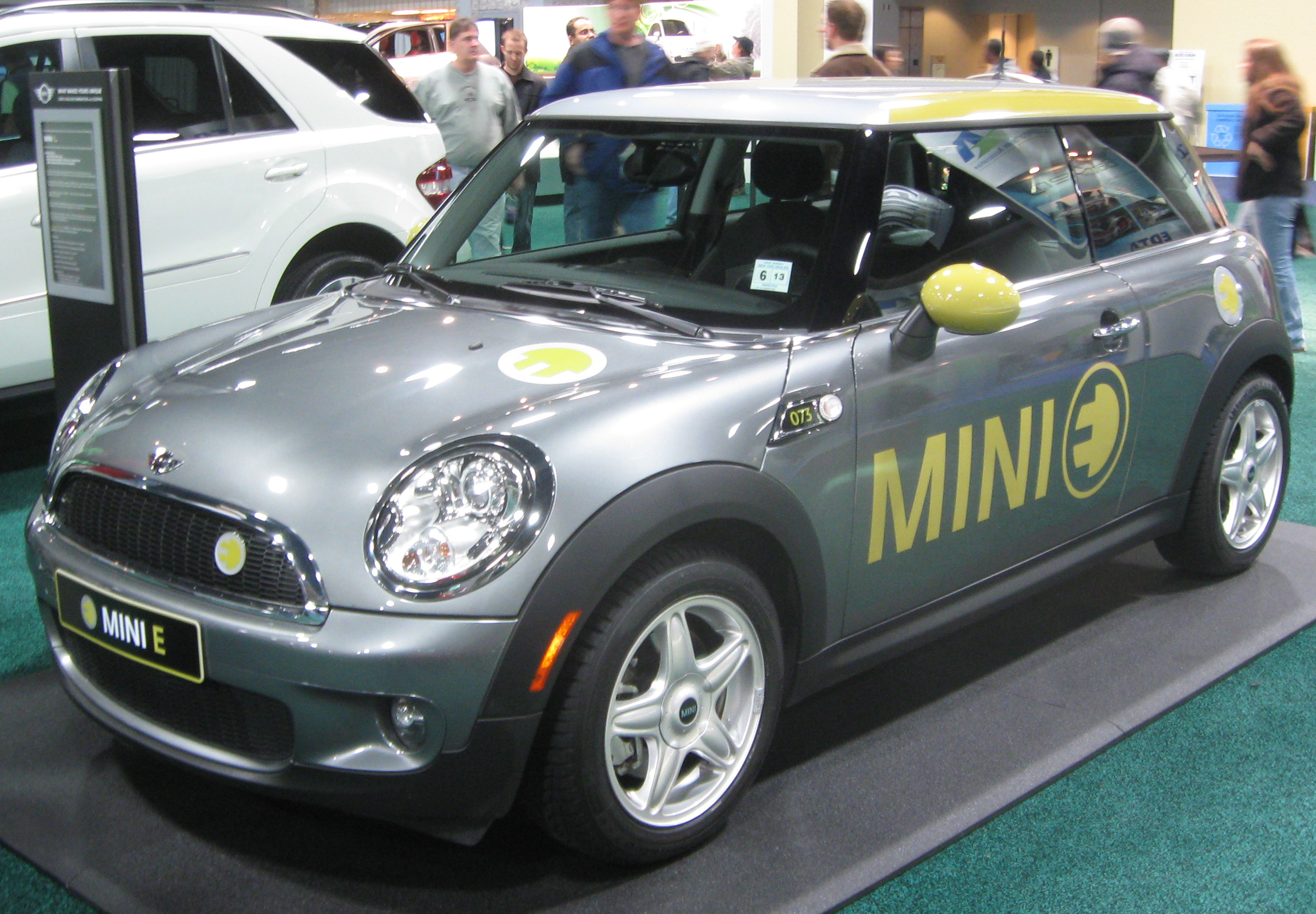
Mini E electric car

The Mini E is a front-wheel drive electric car powered version of the Mini and was unveiled in 2008 at the Los Angeles Auto Show, with an electric motor rated 204 PS (150 kW; 201 hp) and 220 N⋅m (160 lb⋅ft), 380 V 35 kilowatt-hours (130 MJ) lithium-ion battery with distance of 240 kilometres (150 mi). It has top speed of 152 km/h (94 mph). The vehicle gliders are built in the Mini factory in Oxford, while batteries, electric drive and power electronics are manufactured in Munich. The components are then shipped to a specially equipped manufacturing complex, situated on BMW plant premises where the electric motor, battery units, performance electronics and transmission can be integrated.

The Mini E is a demonstration car part of BMW's "Project i", which will be followed in mid-2011 by a similar trial with the BMW ActiveE (all-electric vehicle), which will be built based on the lessons learned from the Mini E field testing. The last phase of "Project i" is the development of the Mega City Vehicle (MCV) urban electric car, a new brand that will be sold separately from BMW or Mini, and is expected to go into mass production between 2013 and 2015.

Field testing began in June 2009 and 450 Mini E were made available through leasing to private users in Los Angeles and the New York/New Jersey area. In May 2010 BMW announced that leasing could be renewed for another year at a lower leasing price. Another field test was launched in the UK in December 2009, where more than 40 Mini E cars were handed to private users for a two consecutive six-month field trial periods. Additional field testing is taking place in Germany and France. This trial program allowed the BMW Group to become the world's first major car manufacturer to deploy a fleet of more than 500 all-electric vehicles for private use.

== Concept cars ==
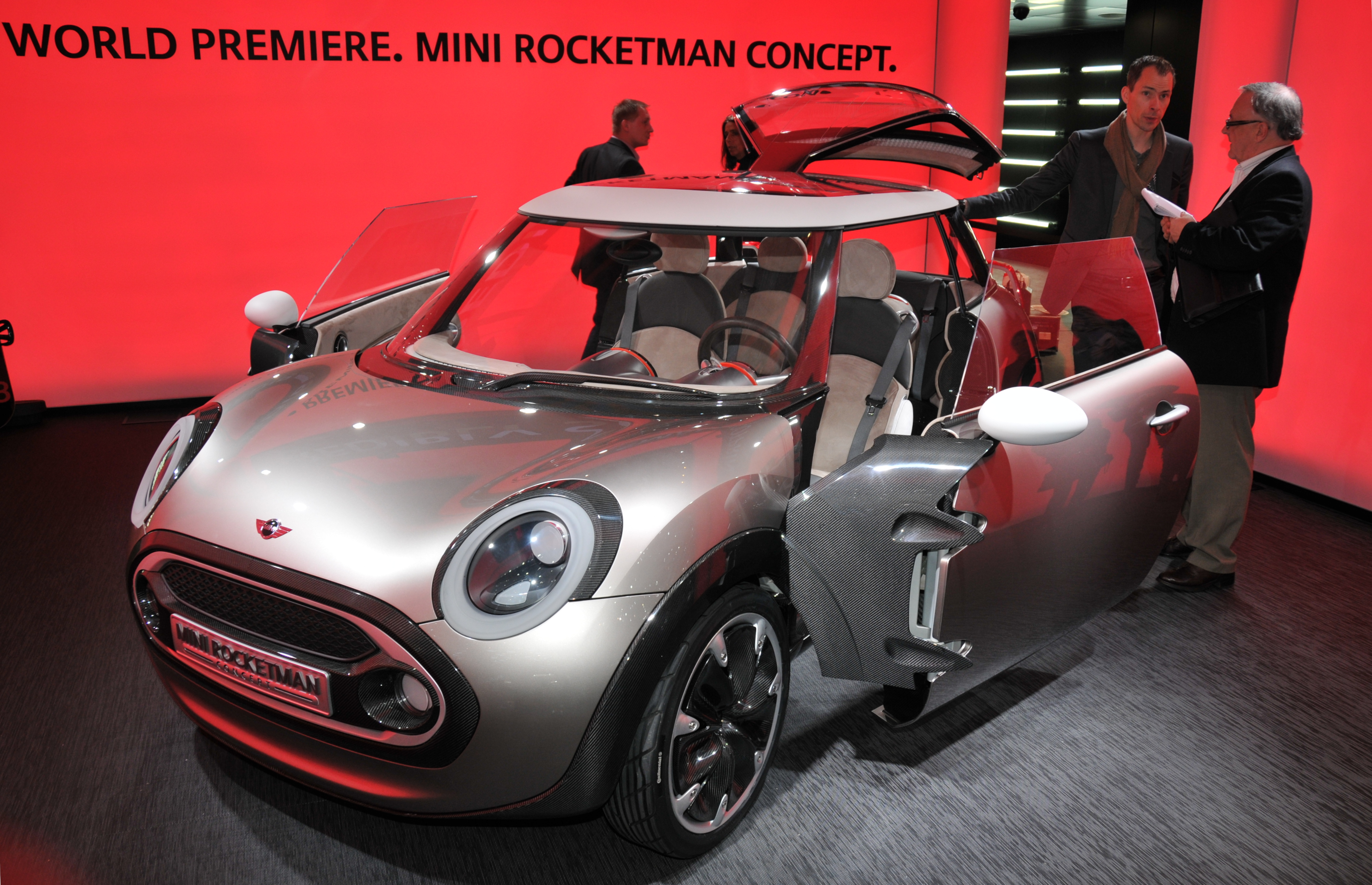
The Mini Rocketman on display at the 2011 Geneva Motor Show

There were several Mini concept cars produced to show future ideas and forthcoming models such as the ACV30 in 1997 and the Crossover in 2008 which became the Mini Countryman in 2010.

The ACV30 featured several elements that influenced the eventual new Mini of 2001 such as the black a-pillars, chunky wheel arch detailing and white roof. The concept was attributed to the BMW designer Adrian van Hooydonk and Frank Stephenson.

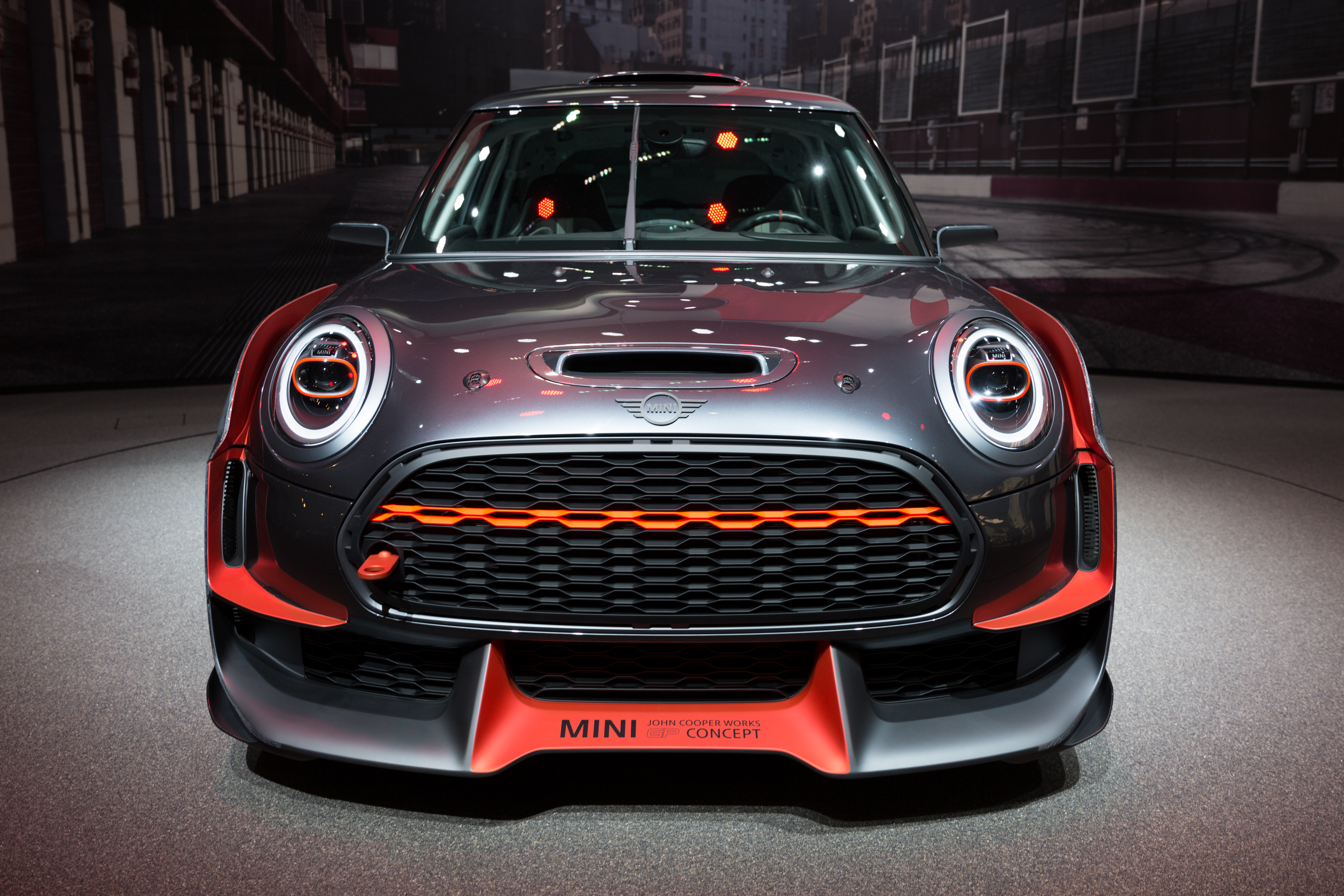
Mini John Cooper Works GP Concept

=== Alternative fuel versions ===
BMW demonstrated a hydrogen-powered internal combustion technology in some of their concept cars in 2000 and 2001, and Mini showcased a hydrogen-powered concept car in 2001 at the Frankfurt Auto Show. The car differs from electric-motor hydrogen concepts, such as the Honda FCX in that it uses a cylinder-based internal combustion engine.

An all-electric Mini is in use at the British Embassy in Mexico that uses around 200 kilograms (440 lb) of lithium-ion batteries. Three electric Minis were also made for use in some subway scenes in the 2003 movie The Italian Job to satisfy the subway authorities concerns over possible carbon monoxide poisoning.

PML Flightlink developed a prototype series-hybrid conversion, called "Mini QED", replacing the drivetrain with an 160 bhp (120 kW) electric motor in each wheel and an efficient on-board petrol generator.

== Motorsport ==
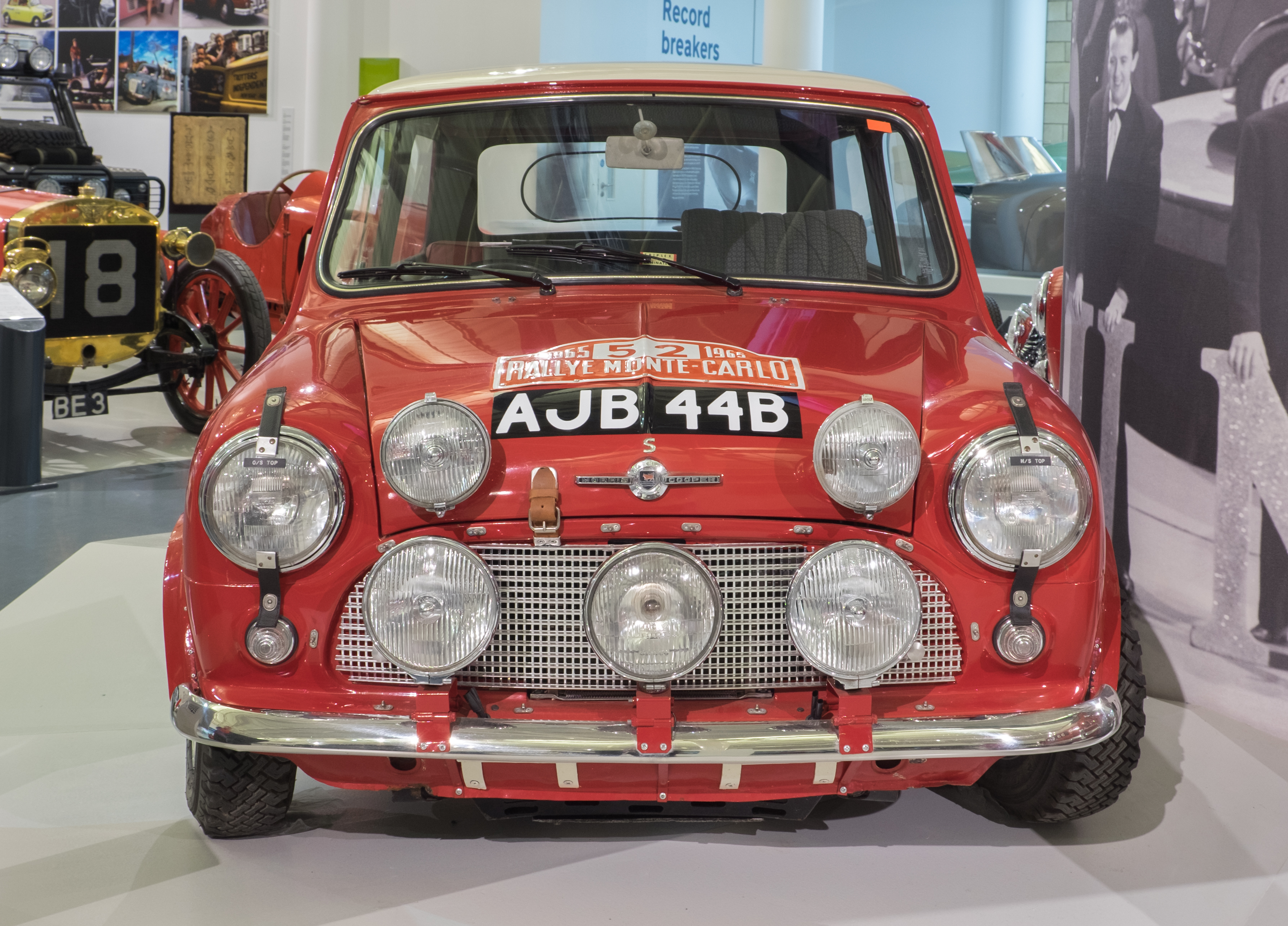
The 1964 Morris Mini Cooper S, winner of the 1965 Monte Carlo Rally

The Mini Cooper S won the Monte Carlo Rally in 1964, 1965 and 1967. Minis were initially placed first, second and third in the 1966 rally as well, but were controversially disqualified for the use of a variable resistance headlamp dimming circuit in place of a dual-filament lamp.

An R56 Challenge vehicle was entered in the 2008 Mini Challenge. The Mini Challenge Motorsport Category runs globally, with the categories in Germany, Australia, England, Spain, New Zealand, and Saudi Arabia commencing in 2010.

RSR Motorsports has entered three Mini Coopers in the KONI Challenge Series Street Tuner class.

=== Mini Countryman WRC ===
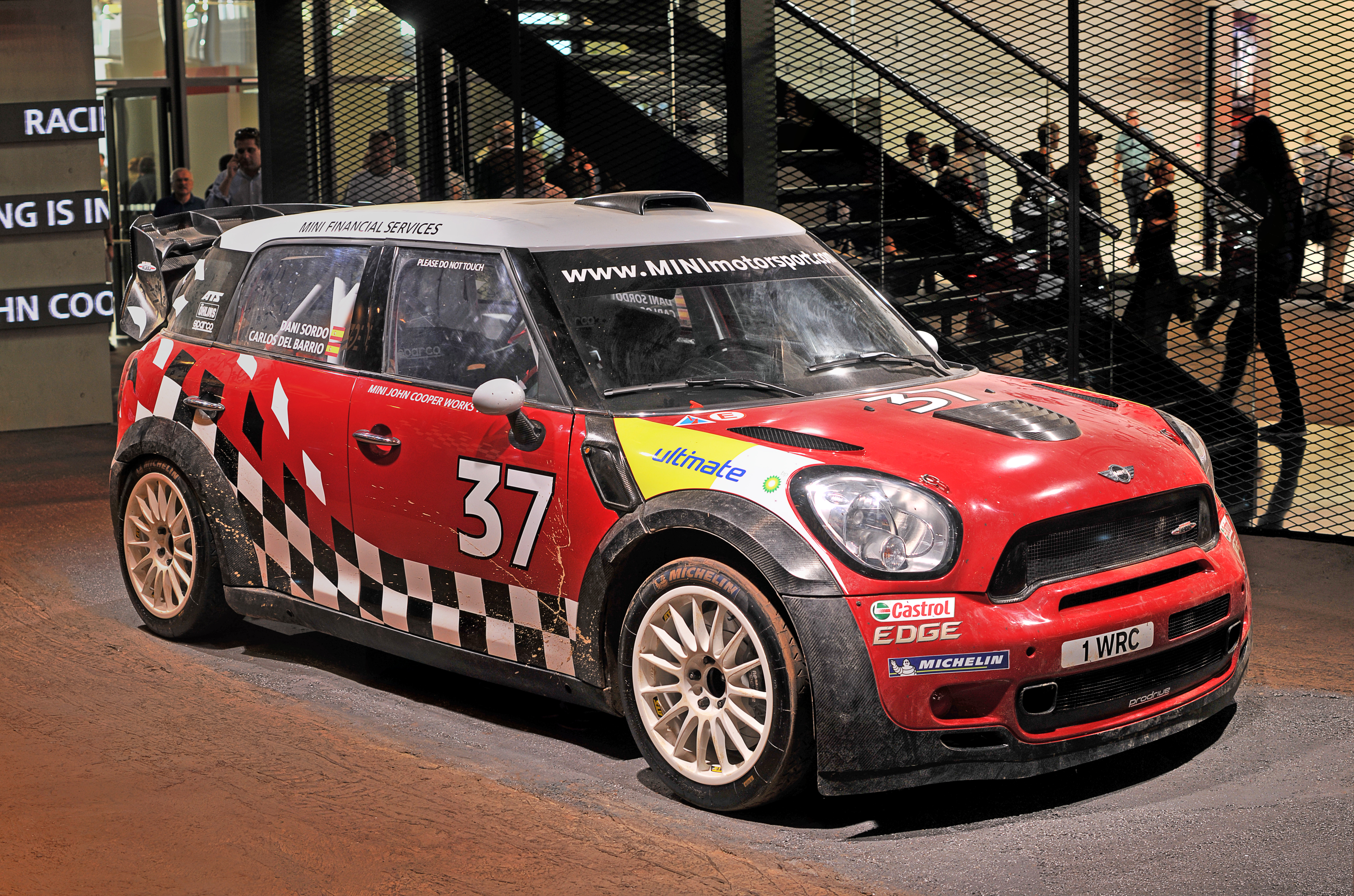
Mini Countryman WRC car

On 27 July 2010, Mini announced plans to enter the World Rally Championship. The Countryman is the chosen donor model and Prodrive have been selected to prepare the Mini Countryman WRC. The factory team competed in a reduced programme for the 2011 WRC season, before cutting funding. Prodrive will still produce all specs of the Countryman WRC cars, and self funded a reduced programme in 2012.

=== Formula E safety car ===
On 30 March 2021, Mini announced the fully-electric Pacesetter. The car is intended for use from the 2020–21 Formula E World Championship onwards.

== Awards and criticism ==
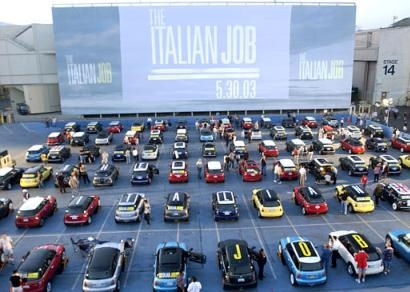
Mini owners were invited to bring their cars to the world premiere of The Italian Job

The original two-door Mini has won numerous awards, perhaps the most notable being: "Car of the Century" (Autocar magazine 1995), "Number One Classic Car of All Time" (Classic & Sports Car magazine 1996) and "European Car of the Century" in a worldwide Internet poll run by the prestigious Global Automotive Elections Foundation in 1999. The original Mini achieved second place for "Global Car of the Century" in the same poll (behind the Model T Ford).

The Mini Cooper/Cooper S (2001–2006) won the North American Car of the Year award in 2003. The convertible model won the Most Spirited/Entry-Level category of the 2005 International Car of the Year. Following the launch of the Mk II Mini, Top Gear named the new Cooper S their Small Car of the Year 2006. The car was runner up in the 2007 World Car of the Year. In 2008 the green version of the Mini, the Mini Cooper D, was nominated for WhatGreenCar.com Car of the Year Awards. The judges commended the Cooper D for its EfficientDynamics stop-start and regenerative braking technology and were impressed by the car's driving experience. The Cooper D reached the shortlist for the Green Car Awards, but lost to the Ford Focus ECOnetic. In April 2010 Kelley Blue Book included the Mini Cooper as one of its Top 10 Green Cars for 2010.

Dr. Alex Moulton, the designer of the suspension system for the original two-door Mini, spoke about the new Mini in an interview with MiniWorld magazine: "It's enormous—the original Mini was the best packaged car of all time—this is an example of how not to do it. It's huge on the outside and weighs the same as an Austin Maxi. The crash protection has been taken too far. I mean, what do you want, an armoured car? It is an irrelevance insofar as it has no part in the Mini story."

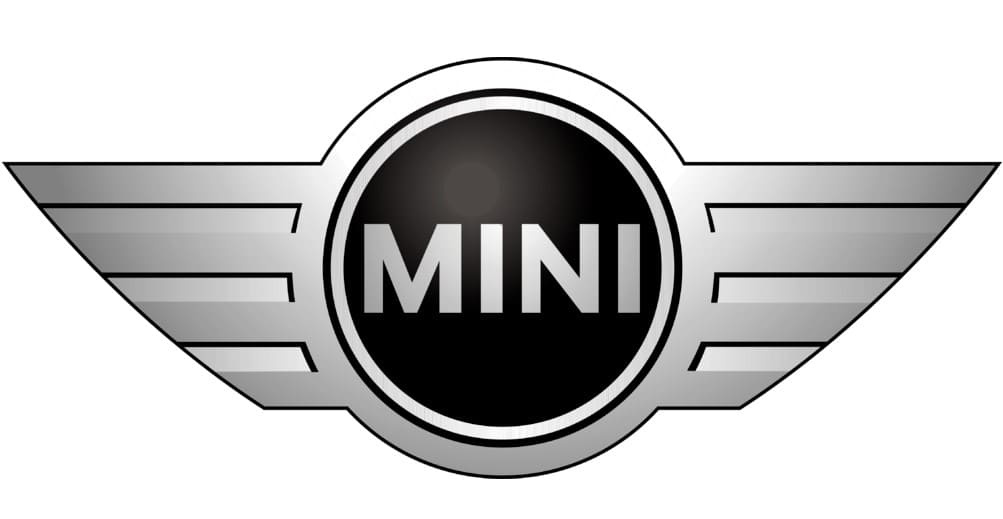
Logo Used From 2001 until 2017

The Pulitzer Prize-winning automotive journalist Dan Neil has suggested that, with the introduction of the Countryman, Mini had pushed the marque beyond relevance by making a car so long, wide and tall it forsook the inner logic of the brand: excellent handling in a tiny size. In the 2013 International Engine of the Year Awards which took place on 5 June 2013, Mini won an award for its 1.6-liter four-cylinder TwinPower Turbo from the Mini Cooper S for the third time in a row in the category of 1.4- to 1.8-liter engines. The engine has "twin-scroll turbocharging with an overboost function, direct petrol injection and valve control based on the Valvetronic system" and has an output of 135 kW/184 hp and provides enough power for the Mini Cooper S to accelerate from 0–100 in 7.0 seconds and in 2013 is available for Mini Cooper S Countryman and Mini Cooper S Paceman and an ALL-4 transmission can also be added to the configuration.

== See also ==
- Mini Paceman
- Frank Stephenson
