= Butler, Shine, Stern & Partners =

Butler, Shine, Stern & Partners (BSSP)
- Type: Private
- Industry: Advertising, Marketing, Design, Interactive, Media, Strategy
- Founded: 1993
- Headquarters: Sausalito, CA
- Area served: National
- Key people: John Butler; Greg Stern; Tracey Faux-Pattani; Sinan Dagli; Maura Mattoon; Jake Bayham
- Number of employees: 90+
- Website: http://www.bssp.com

Butler, Shine, Stern & Partners (also known as BSSP) is an independent creative agency headquartered in Sausalito, California. They provide a variety of advertising and marketing services, including expertise in creative advertising, comms and media planning, data science and measurement, brand identity and design, and strategic brand consulting. They are one of the longest-standing independent agencies on the West Coast.

== History ==
Butler, Shine, Stern & Partners was founded in 1993 when John Butler and Mike Shine became the first creative team to leave Goodby, Silverstein & Partners to form their own agency. Greg Stern joined shortly thereafter as Chief Executive Officer.

In 2003, BSSP acquired SF Interactive (SFI). In 2005, they launched Cleaver Content, an in-house studio that the agency uses to shoot, edit, code, design and produce all forms of content.

As an advertising agency for Converse, BSSP created the award-winning "Brand Democracy" campaign - one of the first uses of consumer-generated content as advertising.

In 2005, in a highly competitive agency review, BSSP won BMW's MINI Cooper account after Crispin, Porter + Bogusky dropped them for Volkswagen. In 2009, BSSP won a Gold Effie Award for their MINI Clubman advertising campaign.

BSSP worked with Priceline for over 9 years, and created the iconic Priceline Negotiator campaign and IP featuring William Shatner.

Awarded Small Agency of the Decade by Adweek Media: Best of 2000s,

In 2017, BSSP resigned the MINI account after an 11-year relationship. Leveraging their automotive experience, the agency was soon after awarded the Mitsubishi advertising account.

In 2018, BSSP was named AdAge's Small Agency of the Year based on their accomplishments with clients including Mitsubishi, Blue Shield of California, and leading basketball videogame franchise NBA 2K.

BSSP has fostered a multi-year partnership with Blue Shield of California, creating notable campaigns for this brand.

The agency has supported consumer brands owned by Sovos Brands, including Rao's Homemade, Michael Angelo's, Noosa yoghurt, and Birchbenders.

The agency's founders are John Butler, previously president of the One Club, and Greg Stern, who served as Chairman of the 4As.

Stern and Butler initiated a leadership succession plan, and CEO Tracey Pattani now leads the agency.

== Clients ==
ESPN, Blue Shield of California, Amazon Business, Constellation Brands, Sovos Brands (Rao's Homemade, Michael Angelo's, Noosa), Topps
