= BMW X1 (F48) =

Second generation of the BMW X1

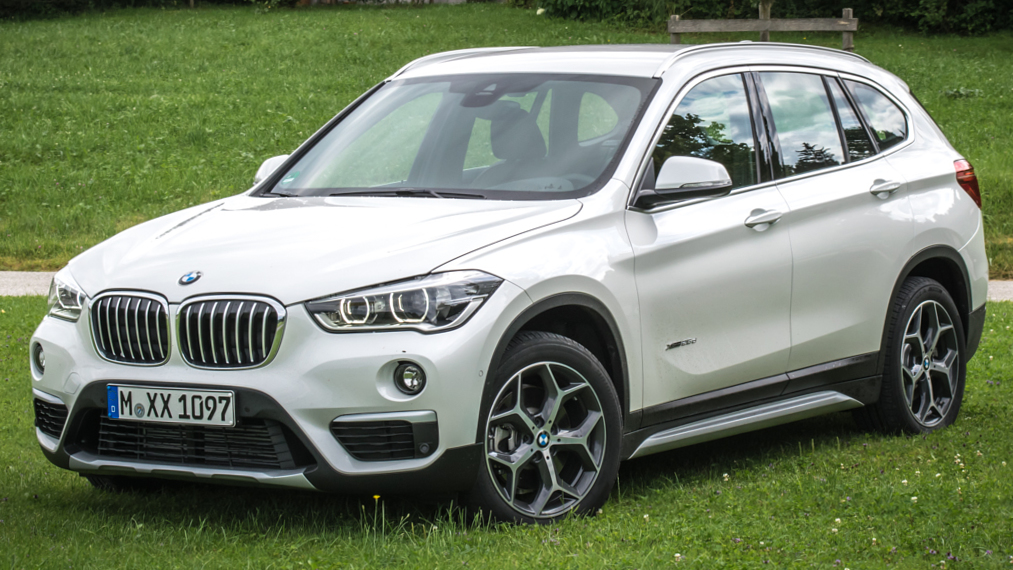

Overview
- Manufacturer: BMW
- Model code: F48; F49 (LWB)
- Production: June 2015 – June 2022
- Model years: 2016–2022
- Assembly: Germany: Regensburg; Netherlands: Born (VDL Nedcar); China: Tiexi, Shenyang (BBA); India: Chennai (BMW India); Brazil: Araquari; Thailand: Rayong (BMW Thailand); Egypt: 6th of October City (BAG); Indonesia: Jakarta (Gaya Motor); Malaysia: Kulim, Kedah (Inokom); Russia: Kaliningrad (Avtotor)
- Designer: Calvin Luk

Body and chassis
- Class: Subcompact luxury crossover SUV
- Body style: 5-door SUV
- Layout: Front-engine, front-wheel-drive; Front-engine, all-wheel-drive (xDrive)
- Platform: BMW UKL platform
- Related: BMW 1 Series (F52); BMW 2 Series Active Tourer (F45); BMW X2 (F39); Mini Countryman (F60); Mini Clubman (F54)

Powertrain
- Engine: Petrol: 1.5 L B38 turbo I3; 2.0 L B48 turbo I4; Petrol plug-in hybrid: 1.5 L B38A15M0 turbo I3; Diesel: 1.5 L B37 turbo I3; 2.0 L B47 turbo/twin-turbo I4
- Transmission: 6-speed manual; 6-speed automatic (xDrive25e); 8-speed automatic Aisin AWF8F35; 7-speed DCT Getrag 7DCT300

Dimensions
- Wheelbase: 2,670 mm (105.1 in); 2,780 mm (109.4 in) (LWB)
- Length: 4,439 mm (174.8 in); 4,565 mm (179.7 in) (LWB)
- Width: 1,821 mm (71.7 in)
- Height: 1,612 mm (63.5 in)
- Kerb weight: 1,425–1,660 kg (3,142–3,660 lb)

Chronology
- Predecessor: BMW X1 (E84)
- Successor: BMW X1 (U11)

The BMW X1 (F48) is the second generation of the BMW X1 range of subcompact luxury crossover SUV. The F48 X1 was unveiled at the September 2015 Frankfurt Motor Show, and later at the 2015 Tokyo Motor Show. Contrary to the previous generation which uses rear-wheel drive as standard, all models are now front-wheel drive based (marketed as sDrive) while also available with an optional all-wheel drive (xDrive).

== Development and launch ==
The F48 X1 is based on the modular front-wheel-drive-based UKL2 platform that is shared between BMW and MINI models, instead of being based on the rear-wheel drive 3 Series Touring platform as with the previous generation X1.

In comparison, the F48 X1 has a 90 mm (3.5 in) shorter wheelbase, and is 23 mm (0.9 in) wider, and 67 mm (2.6 in) taller compared to its predecessor. However, the new platform has allowed for increased interior legroom, headroom, and shoulder room.

A long-wheelbase model for the Chinese market (F49 model code) was unveiled at the 2016 Beijing Auto Show, and features a 110 mm (4.3 in) longer wheelbase. Long-wheelbase models share the same engines and also introduced a new all-wheel drive hybrid model called the xDrive25Le. These models went on sale in May 2016.

The xDrive25i is marketed as the xDrive28i in North American markets.

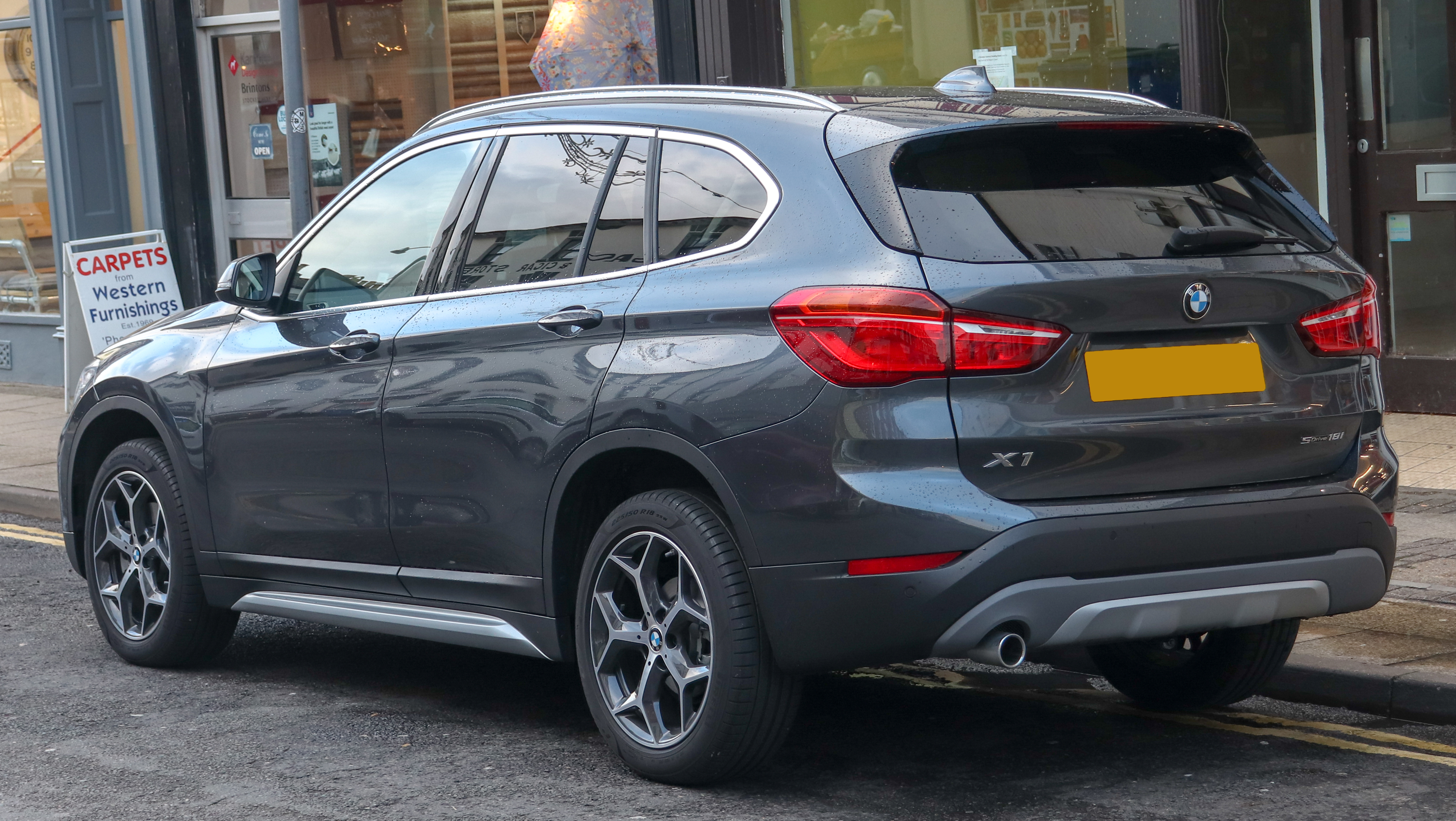
2018 BMW X1 sDrive18i xLine

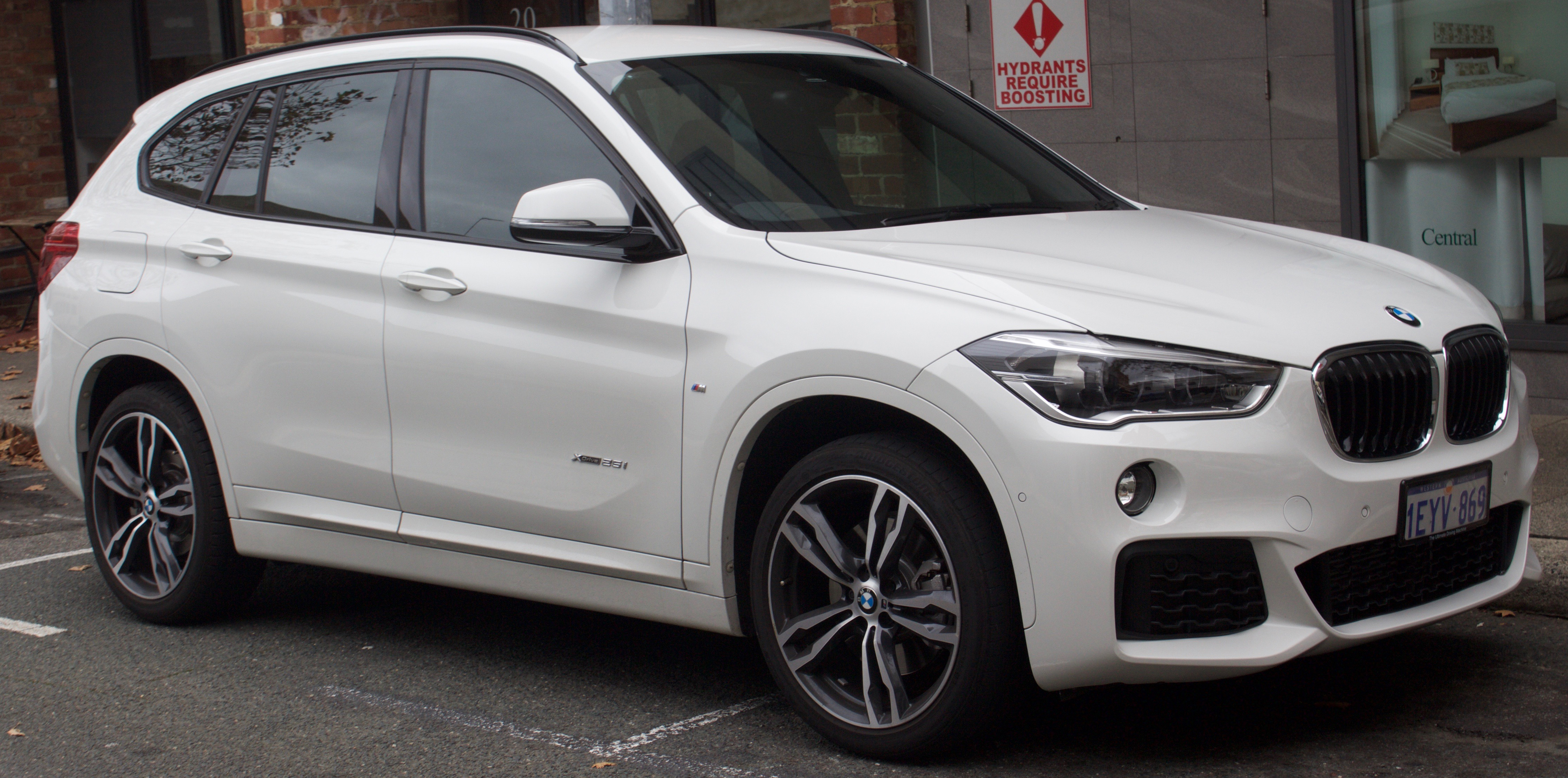
2016 BMW X1 xDrive25i M Sport

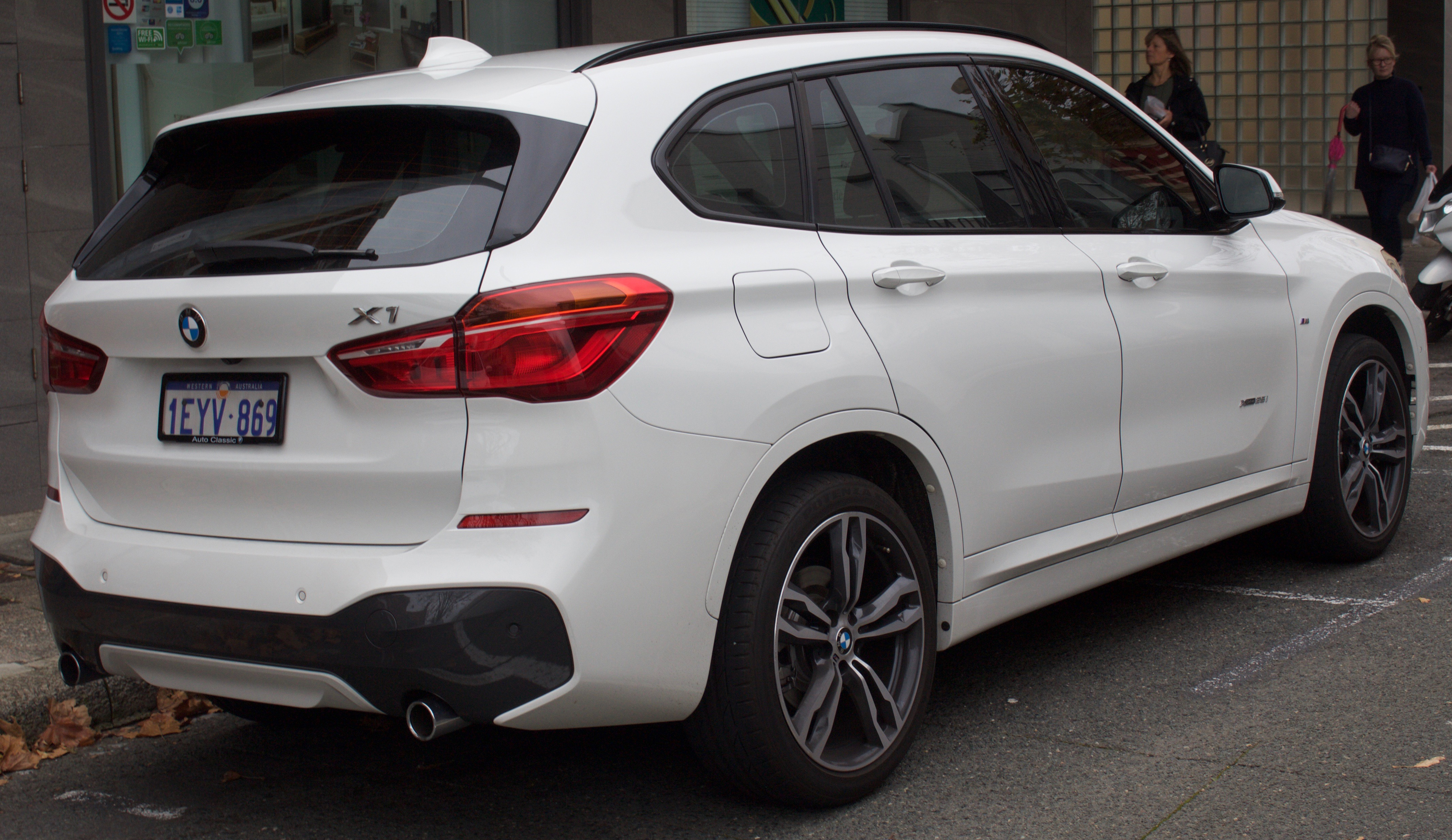
2016 BMW X1 xDrive25i M Sport

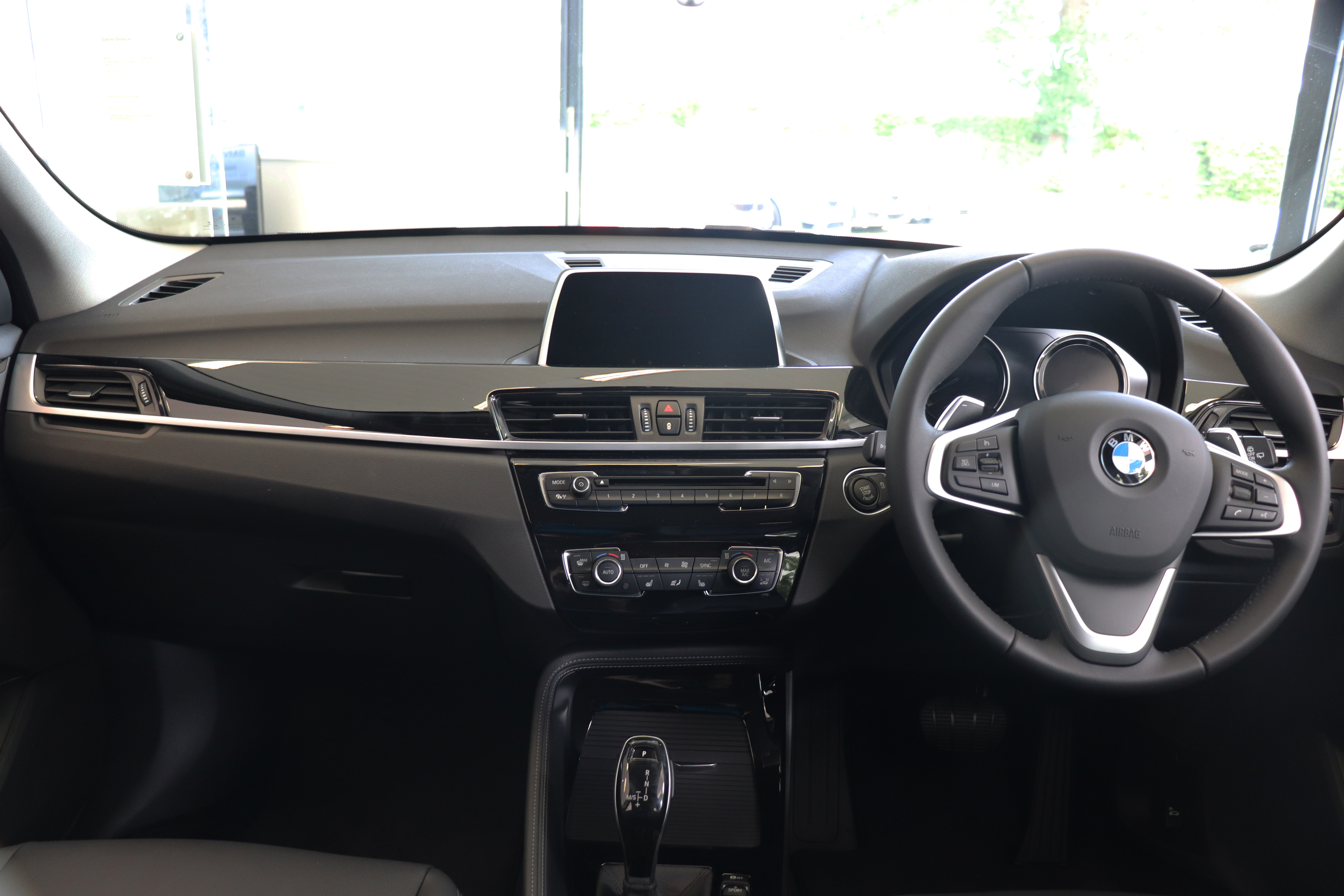
Interior

== LCI ==
In May 2019, the facelifted LCI model was revealed on the official BMW website. Changes include new available LED headlights, bumpers (with LED taillights), new wheels, and a larger kidney grille reminiscent to other contemporary BMW models such as the F40 1 Series.

The BMW X1 xDrive25e plug-in hybrid version was revealed in September 2019.

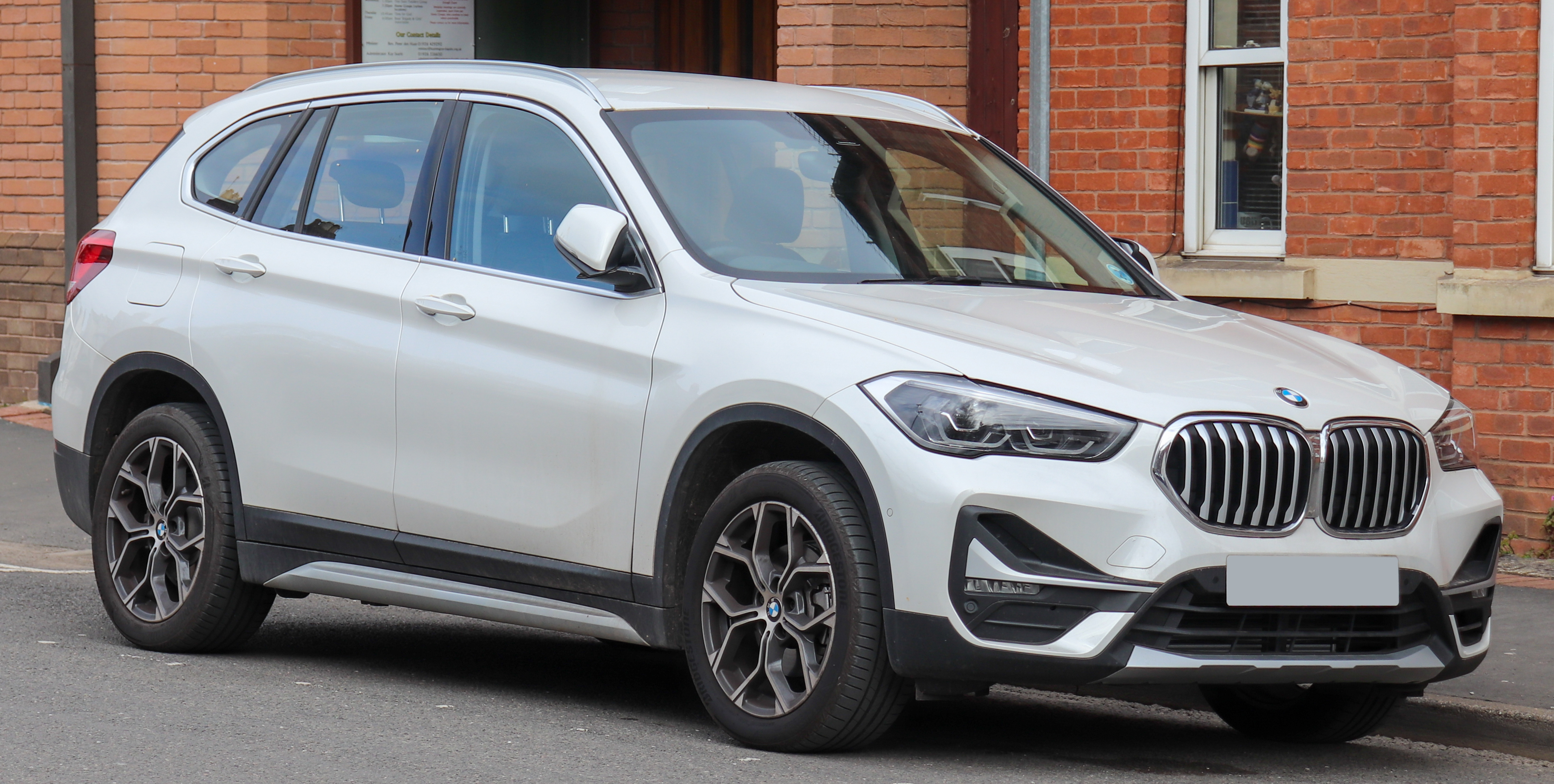
2020 BMW X1 sDrive18i

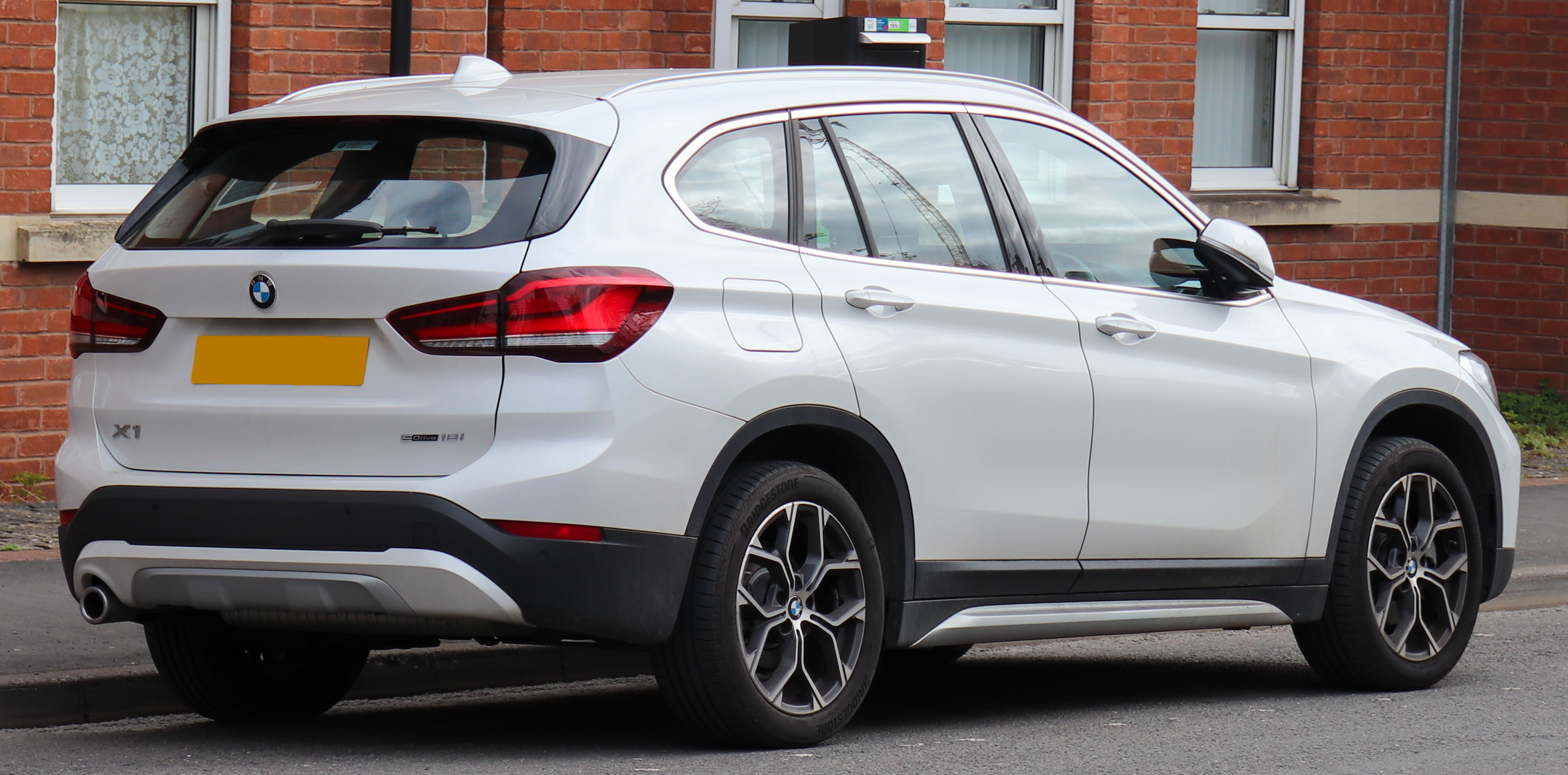
2020 BMW X1 sDrive18i

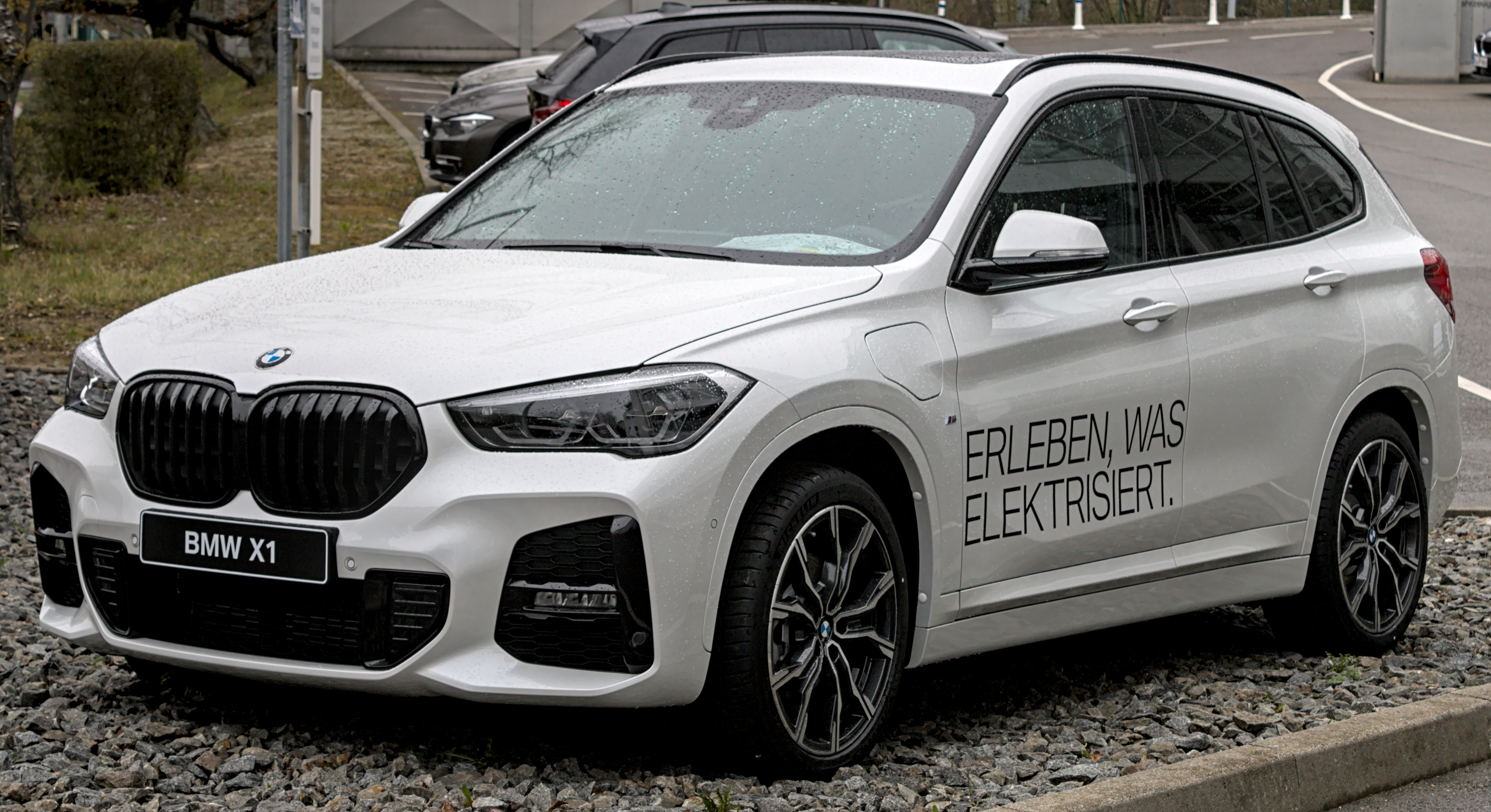
2020 BMW X1 xDrive25e M Sport

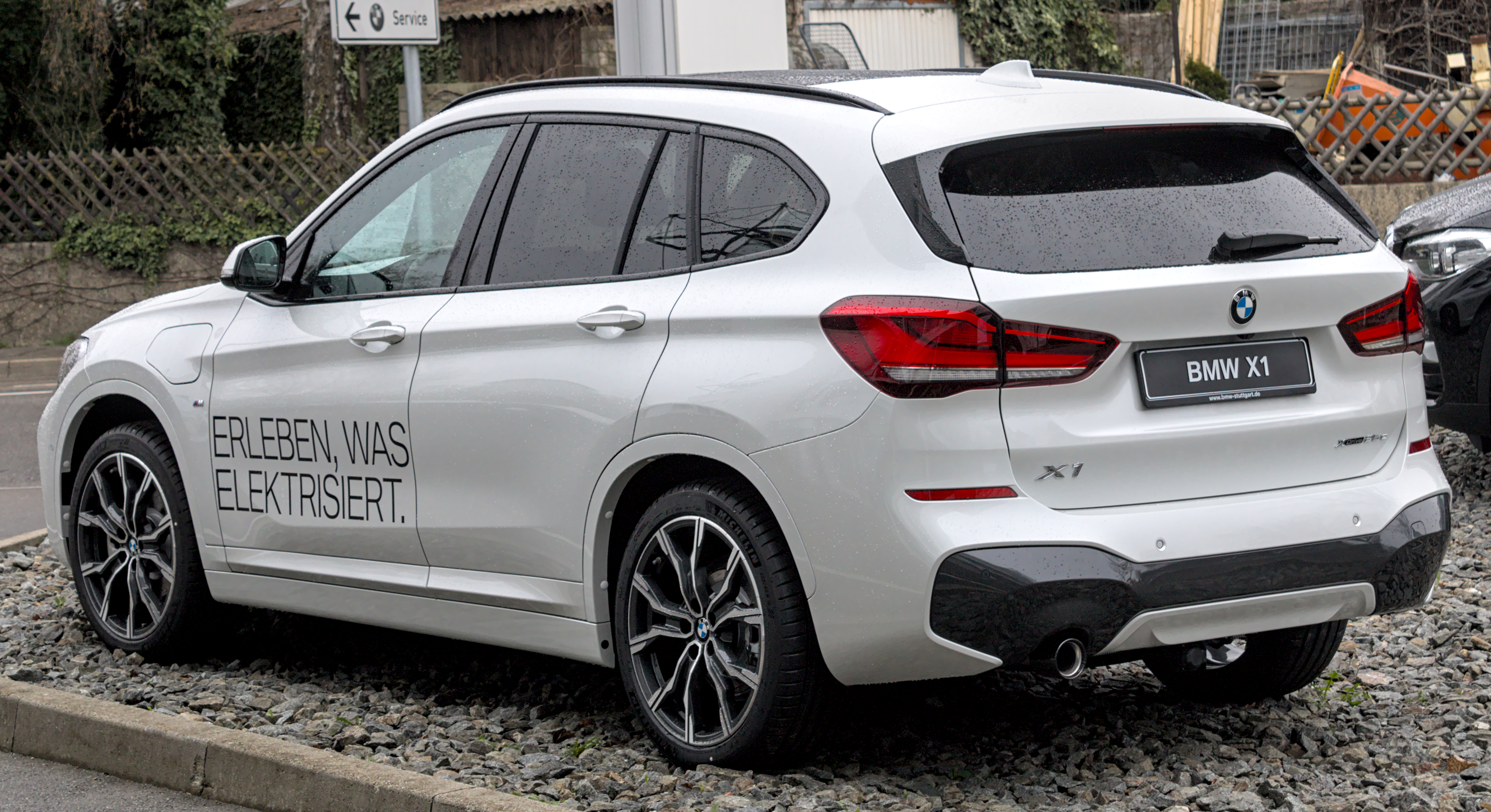
2020 BMW X1 xDrive25e M Sport

== Equipment ==
All models get 17-inch alloy wheels, a roof rack, an electrically operated tailgate, a 6.5-inch iDrive system, cloth seats, and 40:20:40 split-folding rear seats. The X1 is also offered in a Sport trim which adds sports seats, and in xLine and M Sport trim which adds heated leather seats. Available options include a panoramic sunroof, an upgraded iDrive Navigation Plus system with an 8.8-inch touch display, and a head-up display.

=== Transmission ===
sDrive16d and 18i models are available with a 6-speed manual transmission, and sDrive18i models can be upgraded to a 6-speed Automatic Transmission for 2016 to 2017 and a 7-speed Steptronic dual clutch transmission (DCT) from 2018 onwards. The rest of the model range receives the 8-speed Steptronic automatic manufactured by Aisin (AWF8F35) as standard from 2016 to 2017, and sDrive20i models receive a Steptronic 7-speed DCT (similar to the 2018-up sDrive18i) from 2018 onwards, while the rest of the range still gets the same 8-speed Steptronic automatic.

=== Infotainment ===
From 2018 onwards, all F48 X1s are equipped with the newer iDrive 6 infotainment operating system, replacing the iDrive 4 system found in the earlier cars. This also introduced a touchscreen display for cars equipped with navigation (for both 6UN Navigation Business 6.5” and 6UP Navigation Plus 8.8”), and those without navigation continued to be fitted with the older non-touchscreen 6.5” display found in the 2016-2017 X1s with either no navigation or 6UN Navigation Business. Visually the 6.5” displays can be identified with the screen bezels, a matte grey bezel that is raised around the screen indicates it is a non-touchscreen display, while the touchscreen displays have a smooth glossy black glass panel that is continuous with the screen. 8.8” displays are identically visually, however all iDrive 4 equipped cars with an 8.8” display have the non-touchscreen variant and all iDrive 6 equipped cars with an 8.8” display have the touchscreen variant.

== Models ==
=== Petrol engines ===
Model	Years	Engine- turbo	Power	Torque	0–100 km/h (0–62 mph)
sDrive18i	2015–2022	1.5 L B38 straight-3	105 kW (141 hp) at 4,400–6,000 rpm	220 N⋅m (162 lb⋅ft) at 1,250–4,000 rpm	9.7 s
sDrive20i	2015–2022	2.0 L B48 straight-4	141 kW (189 hp) at 5,000–6,000 rpm	280 N⋅m (207 lb⋅ft) at 1,250–4,600 rpm	7.7 s
xDrive20i	2015–2022	2.0 L B48 straight-4	141 kW (189 hp) at 5,000–6,000 rpm	280 N⋅m (207 lb⋅ft) at 1,250–4,600 rpm	7.4 s
xDrive25i*	2016–2022	2.0 L B48 straight-4	170 kW (228 hp) at 5,000–6,000 rpm	350 N⋅m (258 lb⋅ft) at 1,250–4,500 rpm	6.5 s
xDrive25Le (China only)	2016–2022	1.5 L B38 straight-3 with electric motor	100 kW (134 hp)	220 N⋅m (162 lb⋅ft)	7.4 s
xDrive25e	2019–2022	1.5 L B38 straight-3 with electric motor	168 kW (225 hp)	385 N⋅m (284 lb⋅ft)	6.9 s

*sold as xDrive28i in the United States, using the B46A20O0 variant of the B48 straight-4 engine. A front-wheel-drive ‘sDrive28i’ model with the same engine is also offered.

In September 2019, BMW revealed the X1 xDrive25e plug-in hybrid model, which combines a 1.5-litre 3-cylinder petrol engine with a 9.7 kWh lithium-ion battery pack and a 94 hp (70 kW; 95 PS) electric motor. The system output is 220 hp (164 kW; 223 PS) and 385 N⋅m (284 lb⋅ft) of torque. The petrol engine is paired with a 6-speed Steptronic automatic transmission. The pure electric range as per NEDC is 57 kilometres (35 mi).

=== Diesel engines ===
Model	Years	Engine- turbo	Power	Torque	0–100 km/h (0–62 mph)
sDrive16d	2015–2022	1.5 L B37 straight-3	85 kW (114 hp) at 4,000 rpm	270 N⋅m (199 lb⋅ft) at 1,750–2,250 rpm	11.1 s
sDrive18d	2015–2022	2.0 L B47 straight-4	110 kW (148 hp) at 4,000 rpm	330 N⋅m (243 lb⋅ft) at 1,750–2,750 rpm	9.2 s
sDrive20d	2015–2022	2.0 L B47 straight-4	140 kW (188 hp) at 4,000 rpm	400 N⋅m (295 lb⋅ft) at 1,750–2,500 rpm	7.8 s
xDrive25d	2016–2022	2.0 L B47 straight-4	170 kW (228 hp) at 4,400 rpm	450 N⋅m (332 lb⋅ft) at 1,500–3,000 rpm	6.6 s

== Safety ==
ANCAP test results* BMW X1 all variants (2015, aligned with Euro NCAP)
Test	Points	%
Overall:	5 /5 stars	
Adult occupant:	34.4	90%
Child occupant:	43	87%
Pedestrian:	26.7	74%
Safety assist:	9.1	70%

Euro NCAP test results* BMW X1 sDrive18d, LHD (2015)
Test	Points	%
Overall:	5 /5 stars	
Adult occupant:	34.5	90%
Child occupant:	43	87%
Pedestrian:	26.7	74%
Safety assist:	10.1	77%

The 2015 BMW X1 scored five stars overall in its Euro NCAP test.

== Environmental performance ==
In February 2019 Green NCAP assessed BMW X1 with 18d xDrive 4-cylinder diesel engine and manual transmission:

Green NCAP test results BMW X1 (2019) 18d 4x2 manual
Test	Points
Overall:	3 /5 stars
Clean Air Index: 9.4/10: adequate / Laboratory Tests / HC / CO / NOx / PN; 8.7/9 / Cold test / good / good / good / adequate; 2.7/3 / Warm test / good / good / good / adequate; 2.7/3 / Eco Mode / good / good / good / adequate; 3.0/3 / Sport Mode / good / good / good / good; 9.0/9 / Highway / adequate / good / good / good; adequate / Road Test / HC / CO / NOx / PN; 6.5/7 / On-Road Drive / n.a. / good / adequate / good; adequate / Robustness
Energy Efficiency Index: 5.8/10: adequate / Laboratory Tests / Energy Efficiency; 7.5/10 / Cold test / adequate; 2.3/3 / Warm test / adequate; 2.3/3 / Eco Mode / adequate; 2.3/3 / Sport Mode / adequate; 5.3/10 / Highway / marginal

== Production volumes ==
The following are the production figures for the F48 X1:

Year	Production
2016	220,378
2017	286,743
2018	286,827
2019	266,124
2020	230,041
Total:	1,290,113

== Awards ==
- 2015 Auto Bild "Golden Steering Wheel"
- 2016 Auto motor und sport "Best Cars 2016"
- 2016 Auto motor und sport "Value Master 2016"
- 2017 Motor Trend "Best Subcompact Luxury SUV"
- 2018 Auto motor und sport "Best Cars 2018"
