= Hyundai Ioniq =

Compact car

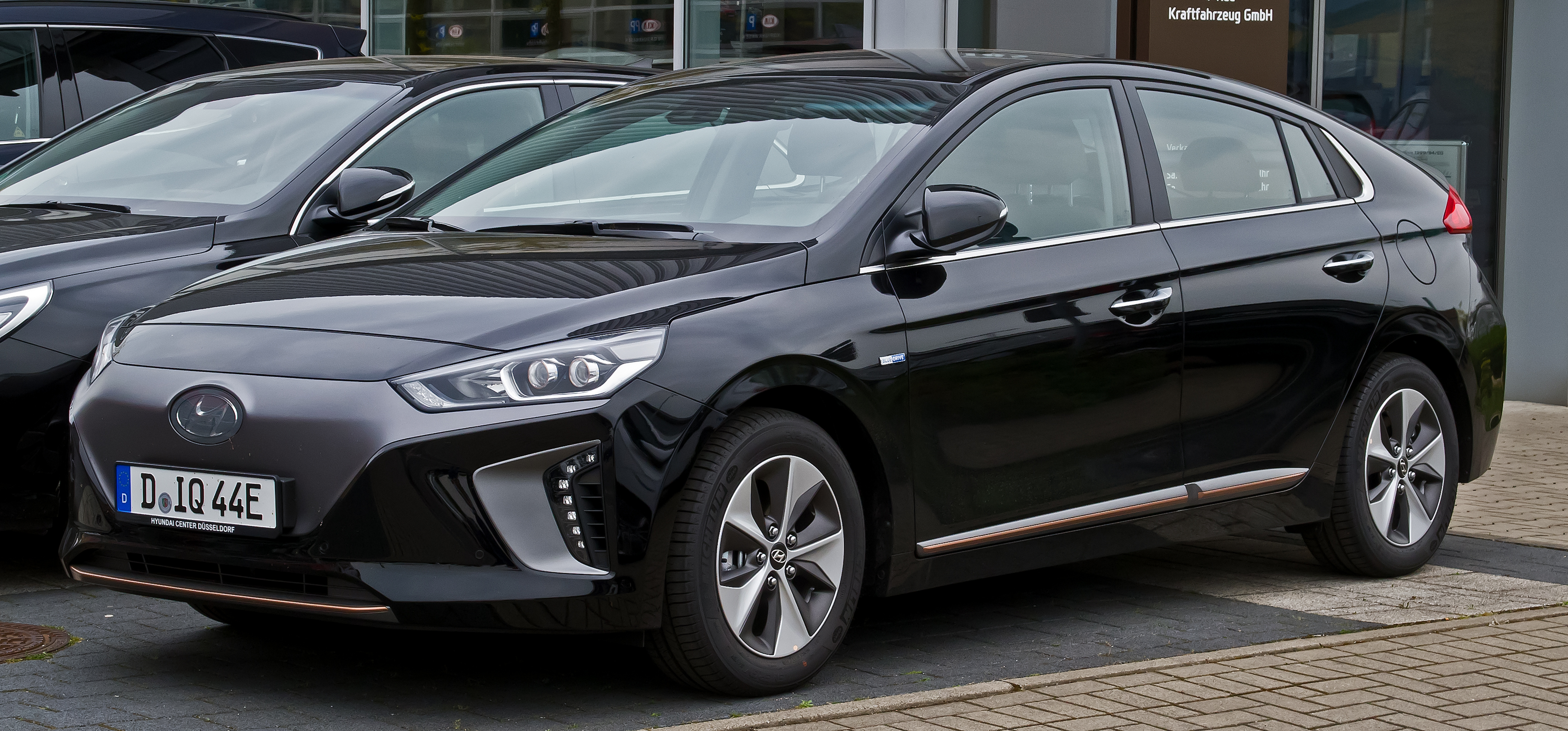

Overview
- Manufacturer: Hyundai
- Model code: AE
- Production: 2016–2022
- Model years: 2017–2022
- Assembly: South Korea: Ulsan (all variants); Malaysia: Kulim, Kedah (Hyundai-Sime Darby Motors, hybrid only); Ethiopia: Addis Ababa (Marathon Motors, electric only)

Body and chassis
- Class: Compact car (C)
- Body style: 5-door liftback
- Layout: Front-engine or motor, front-wheel-drive
- Platform: Eco-Car platform
- Related: Hyundai Nexo (FE)

Dimensions
- Wheelbase: 2,700 mm (106.3 in)
- Length: 4,470 mm (176.0 in)
- Width: 1,820 mm (71.7 in)
- Height: 1,450 mm (57.1 in)

Chronology
- Successor: Hyundai Elantra Hybrid (CN7) (South Korea and North America)

The Hyundai Ioniq (Korean: 현대 아이오닉) (Note: The nameplate Ioniq is a portmanteau of ion and unique.) is a compact car which was manufactured and marketed by Hyundai from 2016 to 2022. A five-door liftback, it is marketed as the first Hyundai automobile to be offered without a standard internal combustion engine, but rather sold in hybrid, plug-in hybrid, and all-electric variants.

The Ioniq Hybrid debuted in South Korea in January 2016, with all three variants debuting at 2016 Geneva and New York auto shows. The hybrid variant launched in its home market in February 2016, followed by the electric model in July 2016. The plug-in hybrid version followed in February 2017.

From its first model year (2017) through the 2019 model year, the Ioniq Electric had been the EPA's most efficient vehicle with a rated fuel economy of 136 miles per gallon gasoline equivalent (24.8 kWh/100 mi; 15.4 kWh/100 km). The Ioniq Blue Hybrid version has been rated at 4.1 L/100 km (58 mpg_{‑US}), making it the most fuel-efficient hybrid vehicle to be mass-produced.

Following its discontinuation in South Korea in 2021, production of the Ioniq ended in July 2022 in favour of battery electric lineup of Ioniq-badged models starting from the Ioniq 3 hatchback, Ioniq 5 SUV, Ioniq 6 sedan, Ioniq 9 SUV and the Ioniq V sedan for Chinese market.

== Ioniq Hybrid ==
Ioniq Hybrid
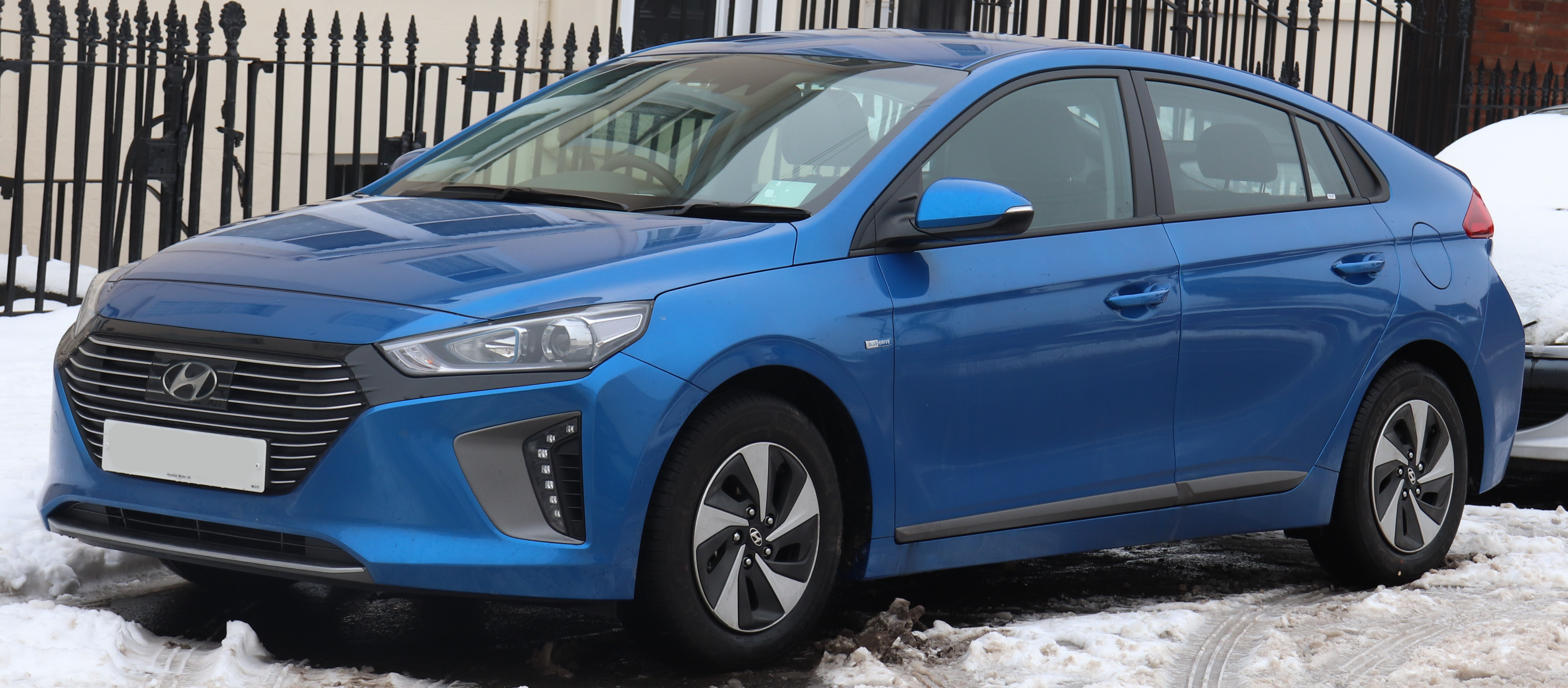

Powertrain
- Engine: 1.6 L Kappa II GDI HEV I4
- Electric motor: 32 kW (44 PS; 43 hp); AC Synchronous Permanent Magnet Motor
- Power output: 77 kW (105 PS; 103 hp) (petrol engine); 141 PS (104 kW; 139 hp) (combined)
- Transmission: 6-speed DCT
- Hybrid drivetrain: Parallel
- Battery: 1.56 kWh lithium-ion polymer battery

Dimensions
- Curb weight: 1,359–1,469 kg (2,996–3,239 lb)

The Ioniq is Hyundai's first automobile built from the ground up and specifically available as a hybrid or electric powered. It is related to the Kia Niro crossover utility vehicle and Hyundai Elantra, with which it shares a wheelbase and suspension components.

The Ioniq Hybrid was released in South Korea in February 2016. The hybrid was launched in Malaysia in November 2016. Two Ioniq Hybrid trims were available, HEV and HEV Plus. The Ioniq Hybrid was introduced in the United States for the 2017 model year in early 2017, with journalists granted early access in February of that year. Production of the Ioniq Hybrid halted in July 2022.

=== Drivetrain ===
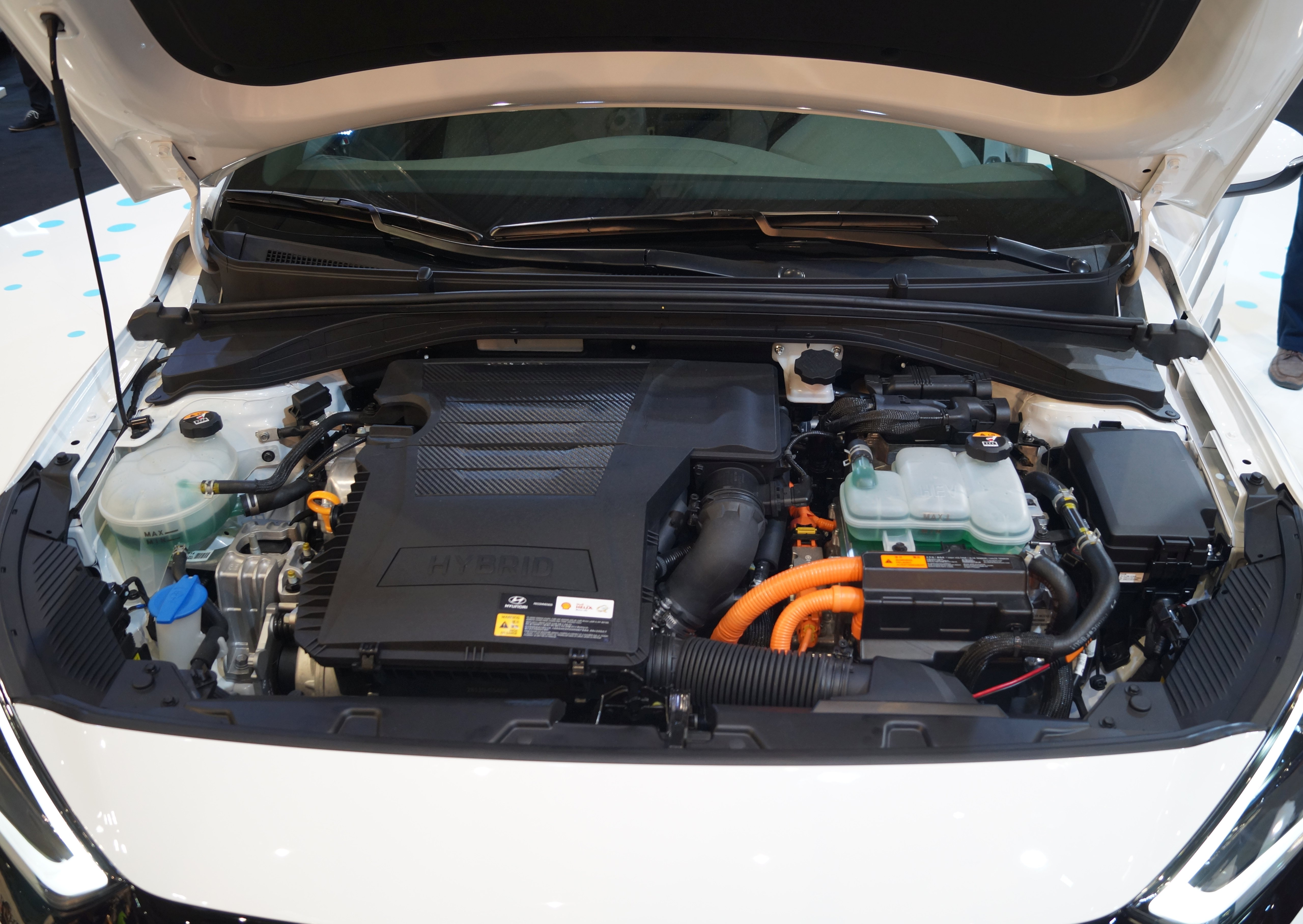
1.6L Kappa engine in an Ioniq Hybrid

The estimated combined total system output is 139 hp (104 kW) with 195 lb⋅ft (264 N⋅m) torque powered by a 1.6-litre Kappa four cylinder Atkinson-cycle engine with 40% thermal efficiency capable of delivering 104 hp (78 kW) with an estimated torque of 109 lb⋅ft (148 N⋅m) plus the electric motor delivers an additional estimated 43 hp (32 kW) with an estimated maximum torque of 125 lb⋅ft (169 N⋅m) for a maximum 147 hp (110 kW) with 234 lb⋅ft (317 N⋅m) torque. Power is delivered to the front wheels through six speed dual-clutch transmission. Neither the Ioniq Hybrid nor Electric is suitable for towing a trailer, like many hybrids and electrics.

The traction battery for the Ioniq Hybrid is a 240 V, 1.56 kWh lithium-ion polymer battery which is positioned beneath the rear passenger seats. Accessories and instrumentation are powered by a smaller 12 V battery, also housed under the rear seats. The 12 V accessory battery also uses lithium-ion chemistry, unlike typical hybrid and internal combustion automobiles which typically use a lead-acid accessory battery.

=== Chassis ===
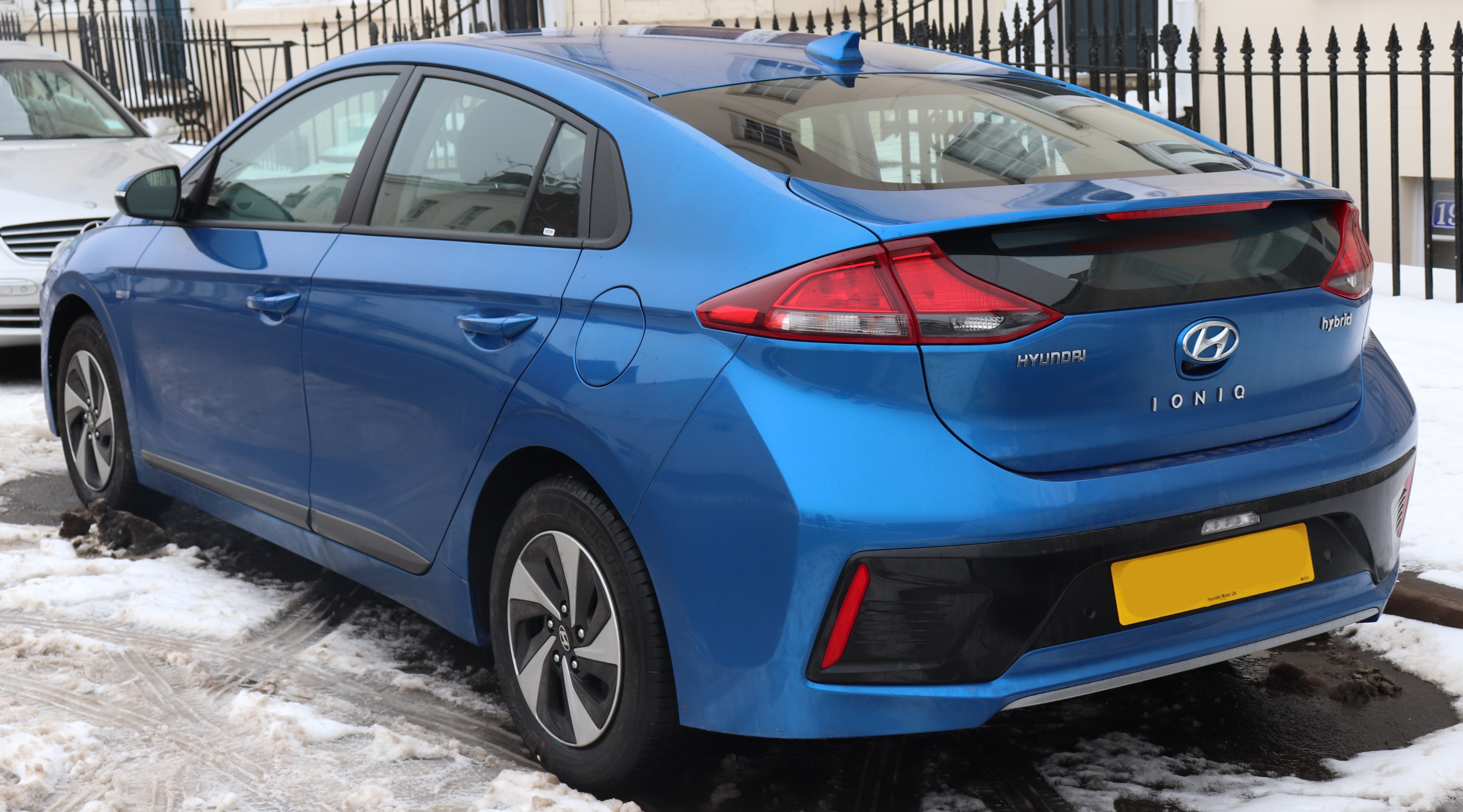
Rear view (pre-facelift)

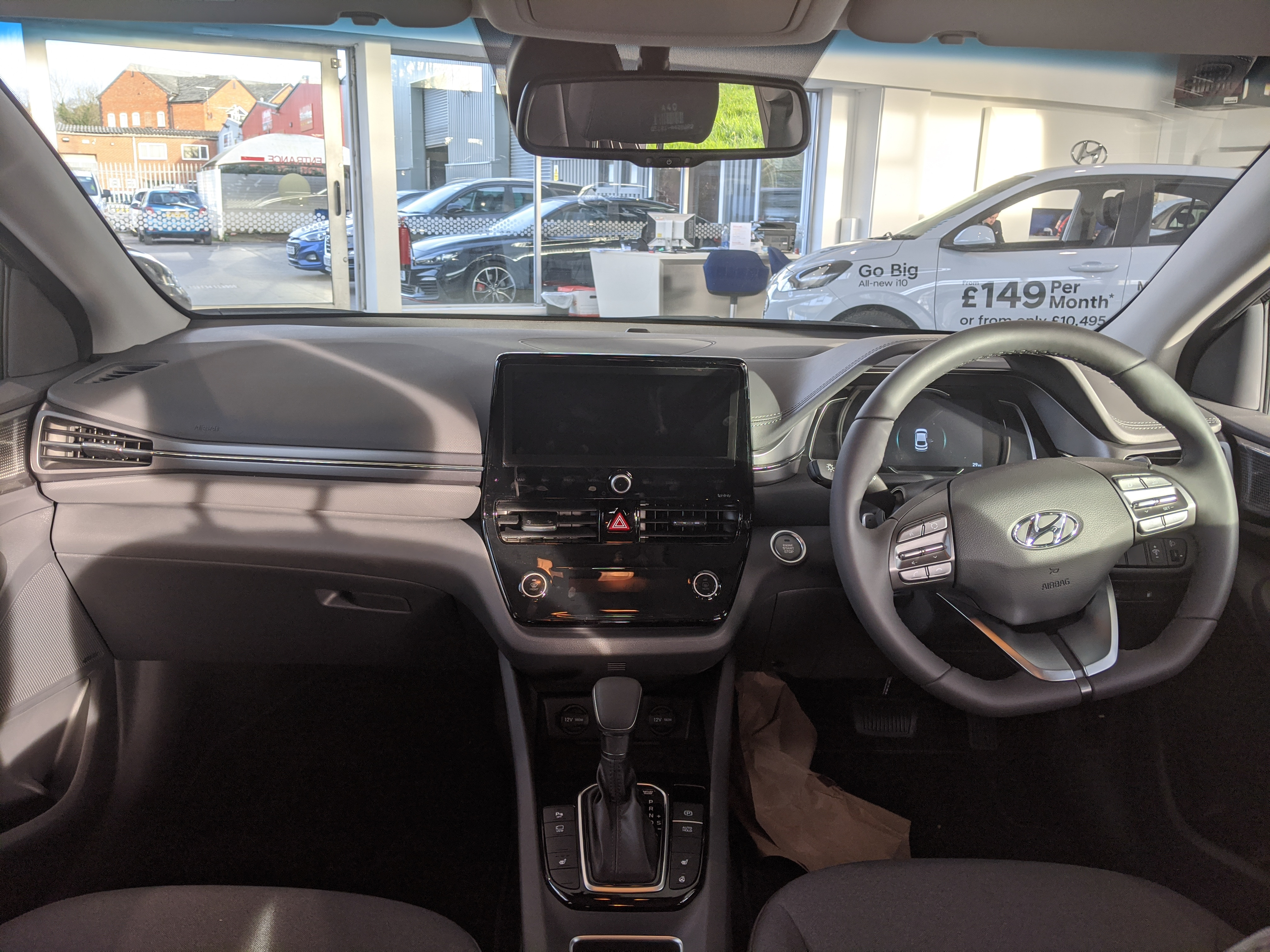
Interior (facelift)

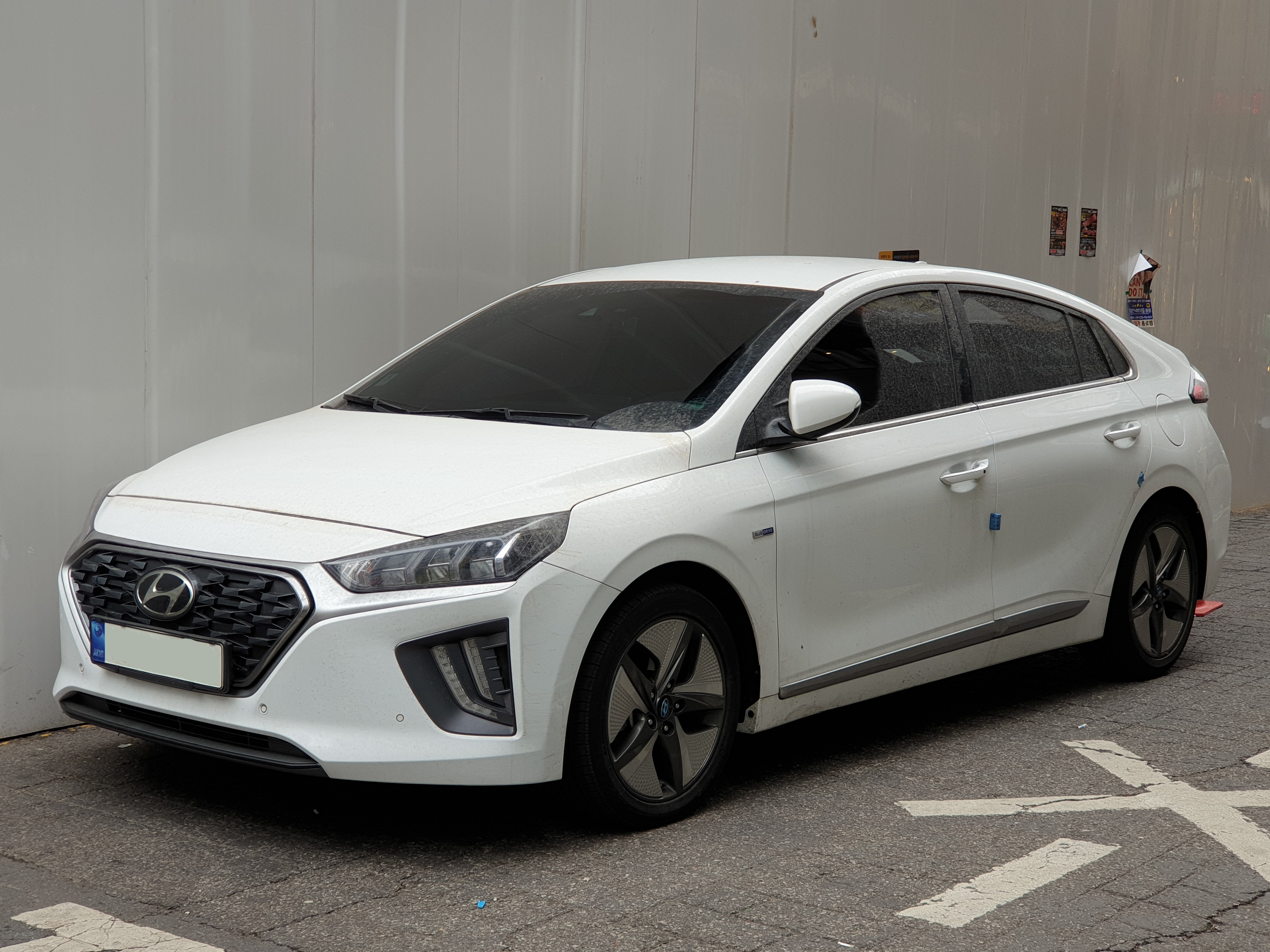

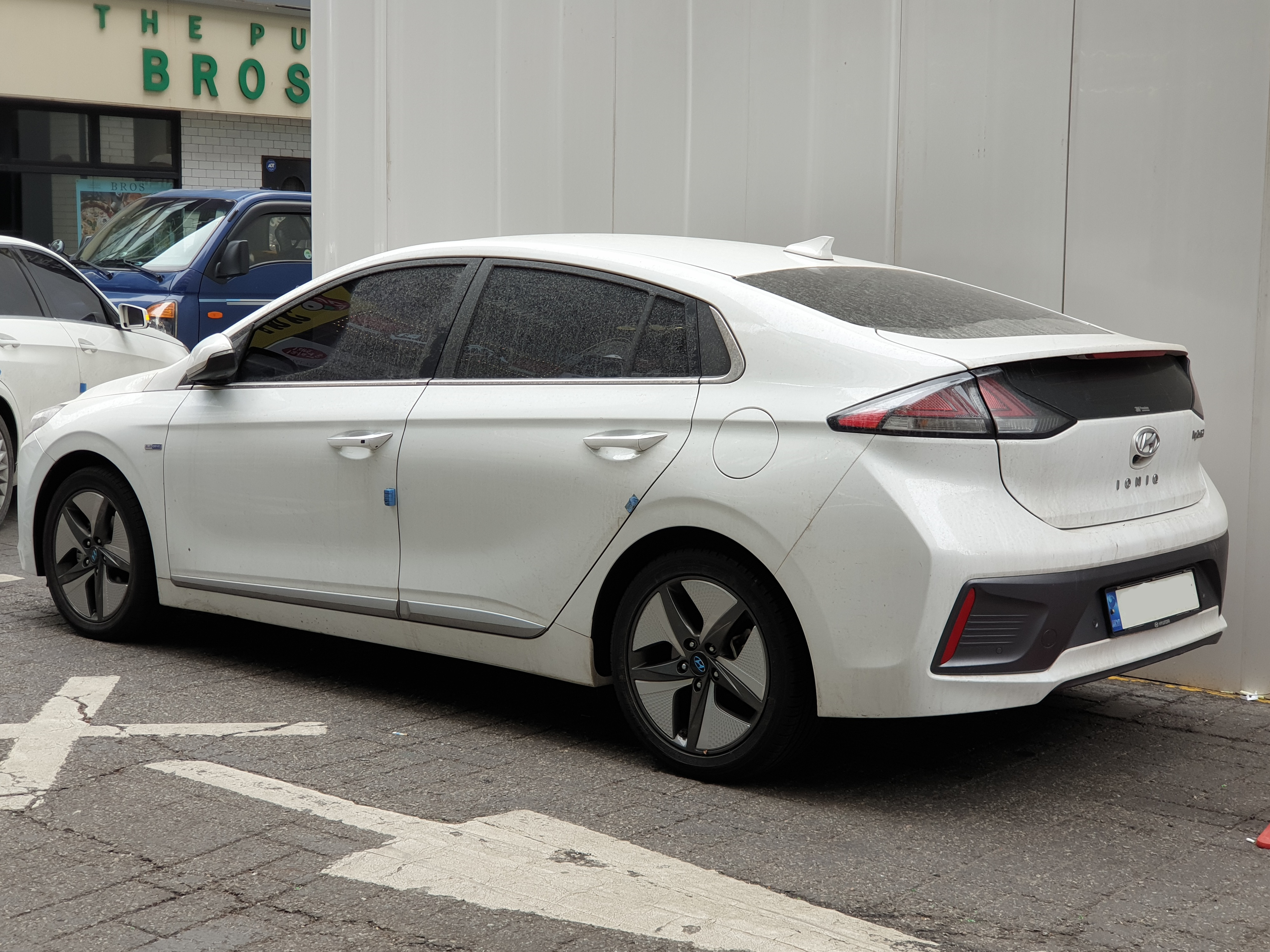
Facelift

Its aerodynamic design helped lower the drag coefficient of the Ioniq down to 0.24. Excessive weight is reduced by utilization of high strength steel for the structure and aluminium for non structural components. The Ioniq uses aluminium in the hood and tailgate, reducing weight by 27 lb (12 kg) compared with conventional steel, with no measurable disadvantages in noise or vibration. With a higher usage of lightweight components and a more compact build, the cargo screen cover is about 25% lighter than the types used in other Hyundai models.

The hybrid version competes with, and surpasses in fuel economy, the previous mileage leader in the Toyota Prius. Hyundai expects the model with 15-inch wheels to obtain an EPA rated combined fuel economy between 57 mpg_{‑US} (4.1 L/100 km; 68 mpg_{‑imp}) and 58 mpg_{‑US} (4.1 L/100 km; 70 mpg_{‑imp}), just ahead of the 2016 Toyota Prius at 56 mpg_{‑US} (4.2 L/100 km; 67 mpg_{‑imp}). The Ioniq is also available with a 17-inch alloy rim option. Trims that include alloy rims reduce highway fuel economy by approximately 5 MPG.

== Ioniq Electric ==
Ioniq Electric
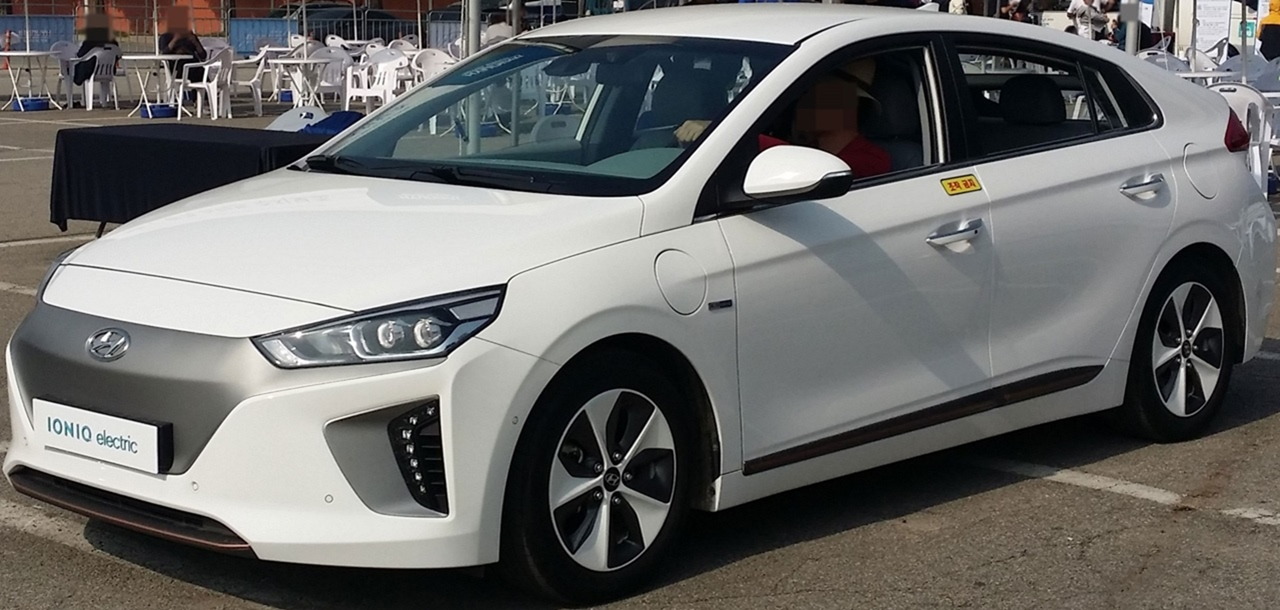

Powertrain
- Electric motor: Front-engine rear-battery Permanent Magnet Synchronous Motor
- Power output: 89 kW (120 hp); 295 N⋅m (218 lb⋅ft) (2016–2019); 100 kW (134 hp); 295 N⋅m (218 lb⋅ft) (2020–2022)
- Transmission: 1-speed automatic
- Battery: 28 kWh lithium-ion polymer battery (2016–2019); 38.3 kWh lithium-ion polymer battery (2020–2022)
- Electric range: 2016–2019: 124 mi (200 km) (EPA); 280 km (174 mi) (NEDC); 169 km (105 mi) (South Korea) 2020–2022: 170 mi (274 km) (EPA); 310 km (193 mi) (WLTP); 200 km (124 mi) (South Korea)
- Plug-in charging: 6.6 kW (2016–2019); 7.2 kW (2020–2022)

Dimensions
- Curb weight: 1,420–1,575 kg (3,131–3,472 lb)

The Hyundai Ioniq Electric is a limited-production all-electric version of the Ioniq that is sold only in select countries and US states. It features a 28 kWh lithium-ion polymer battery that delivers an EPA-rated range of 124 mi (200 km). The car was refreshed for the 2020 model year with a new interior, larger battery, and increased range and traction motor output.

Initially, the Ioniq Electric was available in the United States in California only. As of 2019, Hyundai USA sells the Ioniq Electric only in select states. It is sold by Hyundai in other countries as well, which as of December 2018 included Canada, Norway, Netherlands, Portugal and Switzerland. The car was discontinued in the US market for the 2022 model year.

=== Drivetrain and chassis ===
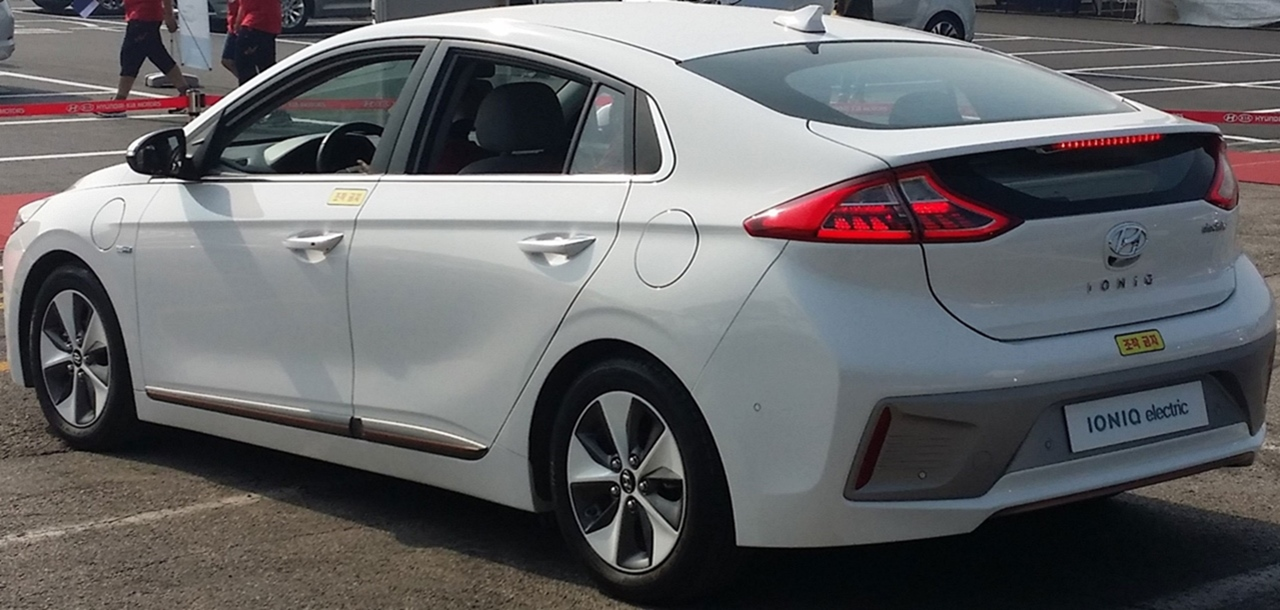
Rear view (pre-facelift)

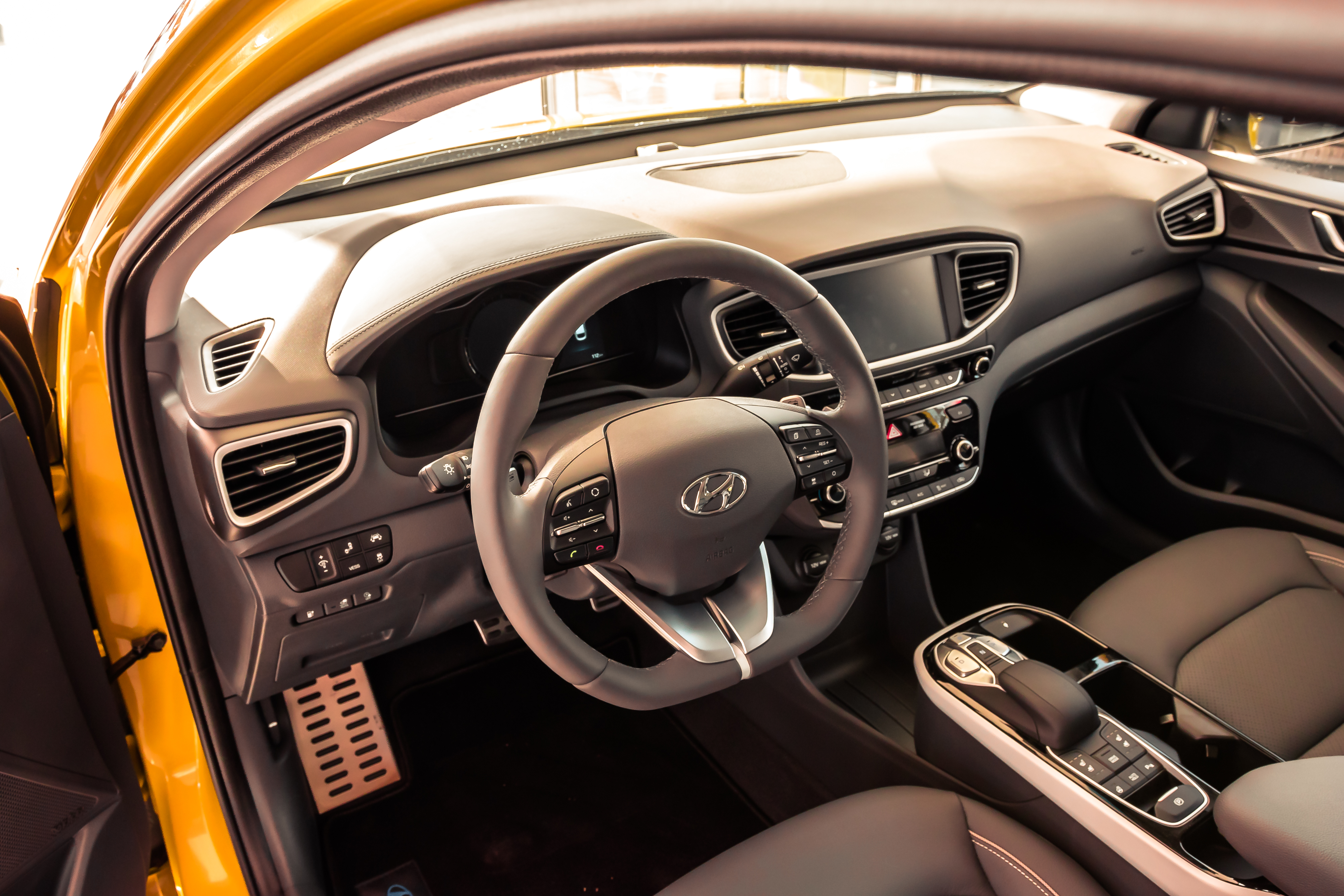
Interior (pre-facelift)

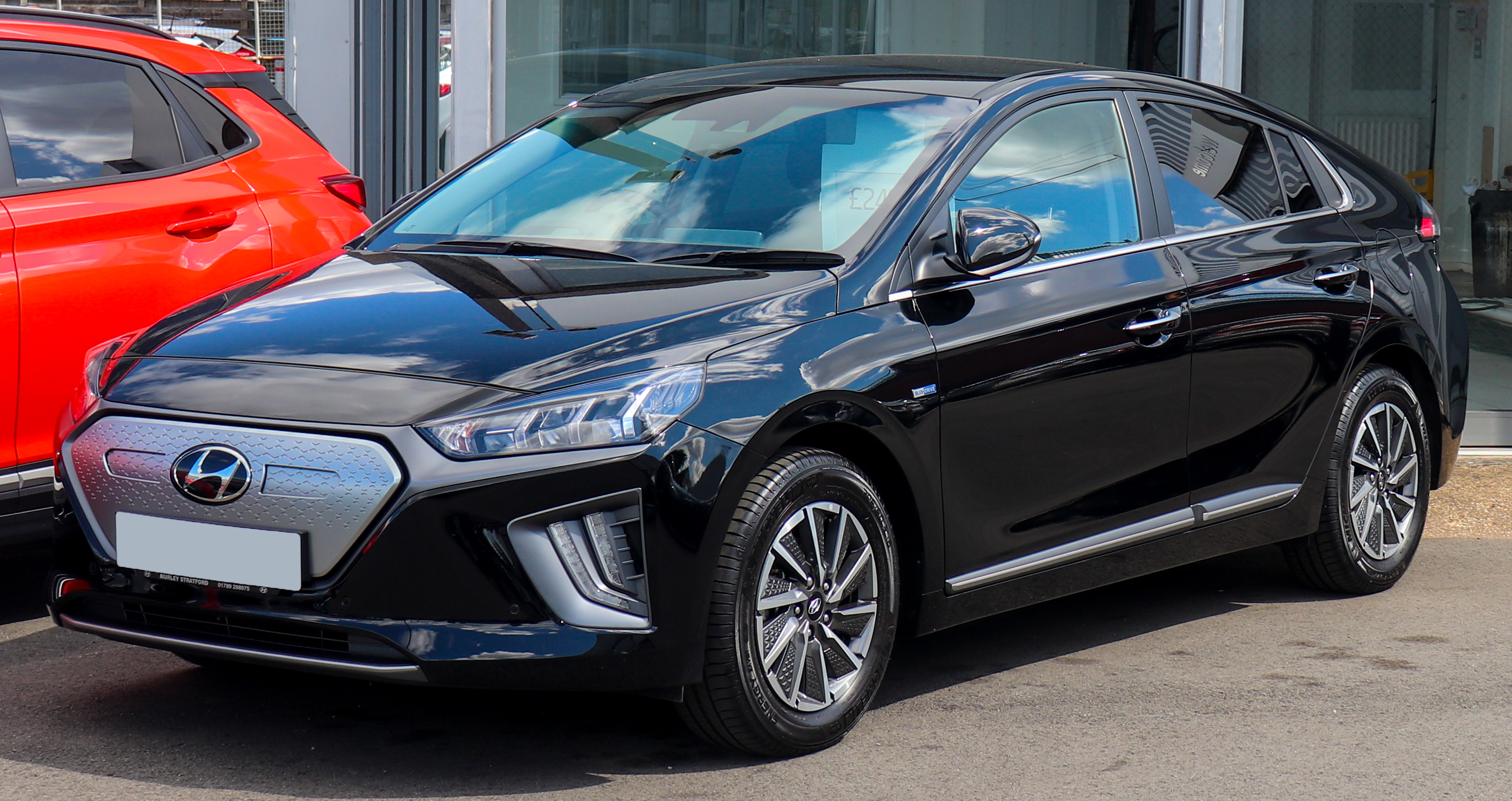

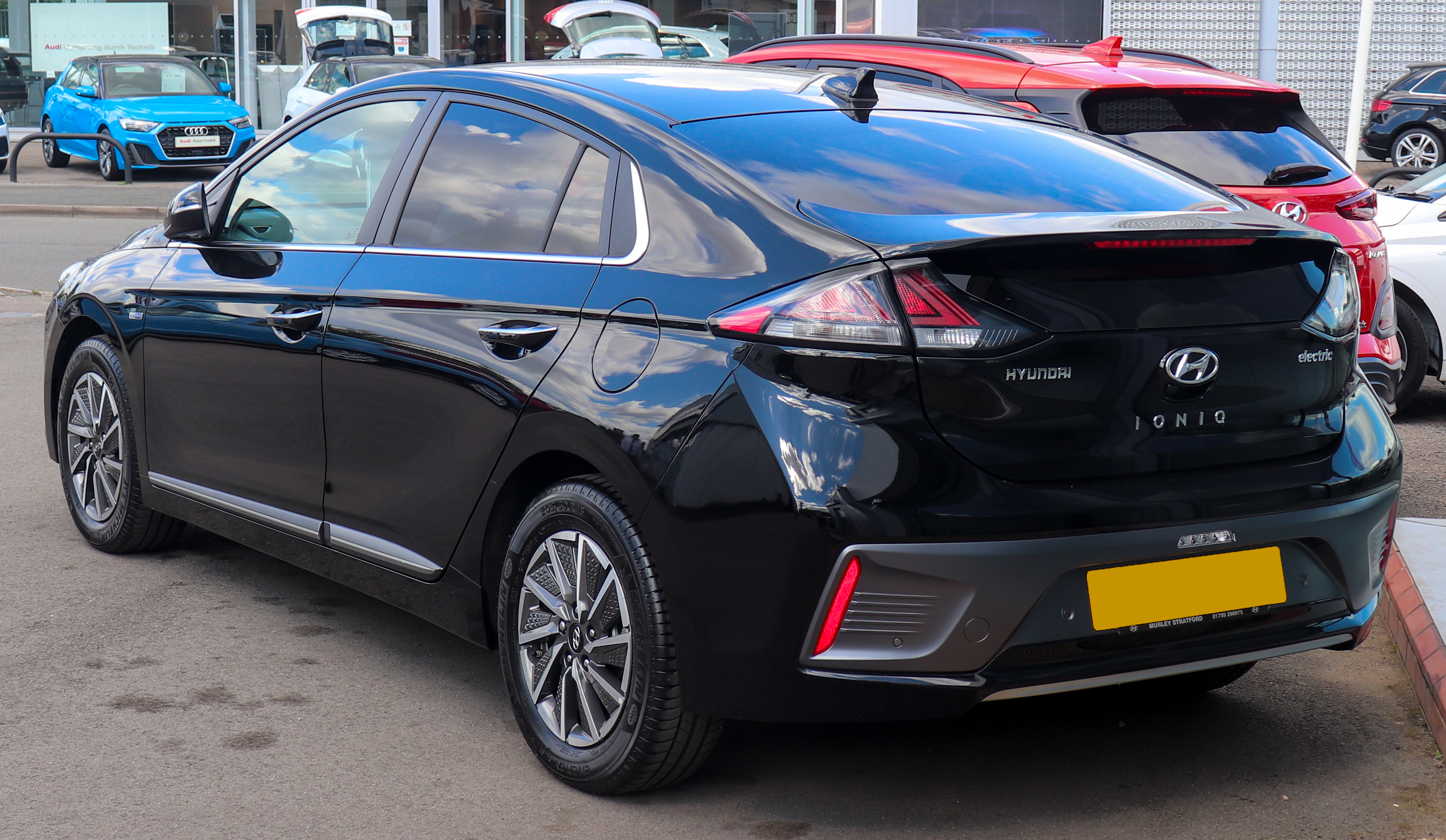
Facelift

The Ioniq Electric is bundled with the portable "In-Cable Control Box" (ICCB), an electric vehicle supply equipment that allows drivers to charge their Ioniq using a conventional household outlet, but this is recommended only for use in emergencies in countries with 120 V AC outlets. In most countries with 220–240 V AC household outlets, 100% range can be added with an overnight charge. The charging plug of the car is located in a position where fuel fillers are normally located; the vehicle is equipped with a CCS Combo 1 inlet, accepting charging rates at up to 100 kW at a DC fast charging station, although the 38kwh version would only accept a 50kw ‘fast’ charge.

The electric traction motor has a rated output of 118 hp (88 kW) and 215 lb⋅ft (292 N⋅m). Power output was increased to 134 hp (100 kW) with the 2020 refresh; peak torque increased modestly to 218 lb⋅ft (296 N⋅m).

The Ioniq features paddle shifters to allow drivers to choose from one of four levels of regenerative braking. Single-pedal control is not possible: the driver must use the brake pedal to come to a complete stop, even at maximum regeneration. There are three driving modes (Eco / Normal / Sport) which affect throttle tuning; in addition, Eco decreases the output of the climate control system. For the 2020 model year, holding the regeneration paddle enabled maximum regeneration and one-pedal driving.

The rear suspension was switched to a torsion beam instead of the multilink setup used on the Ioniq Hybrid to accommodate the larger traction battery, which is carried under the rear seat.

=== Range and efficiency ===
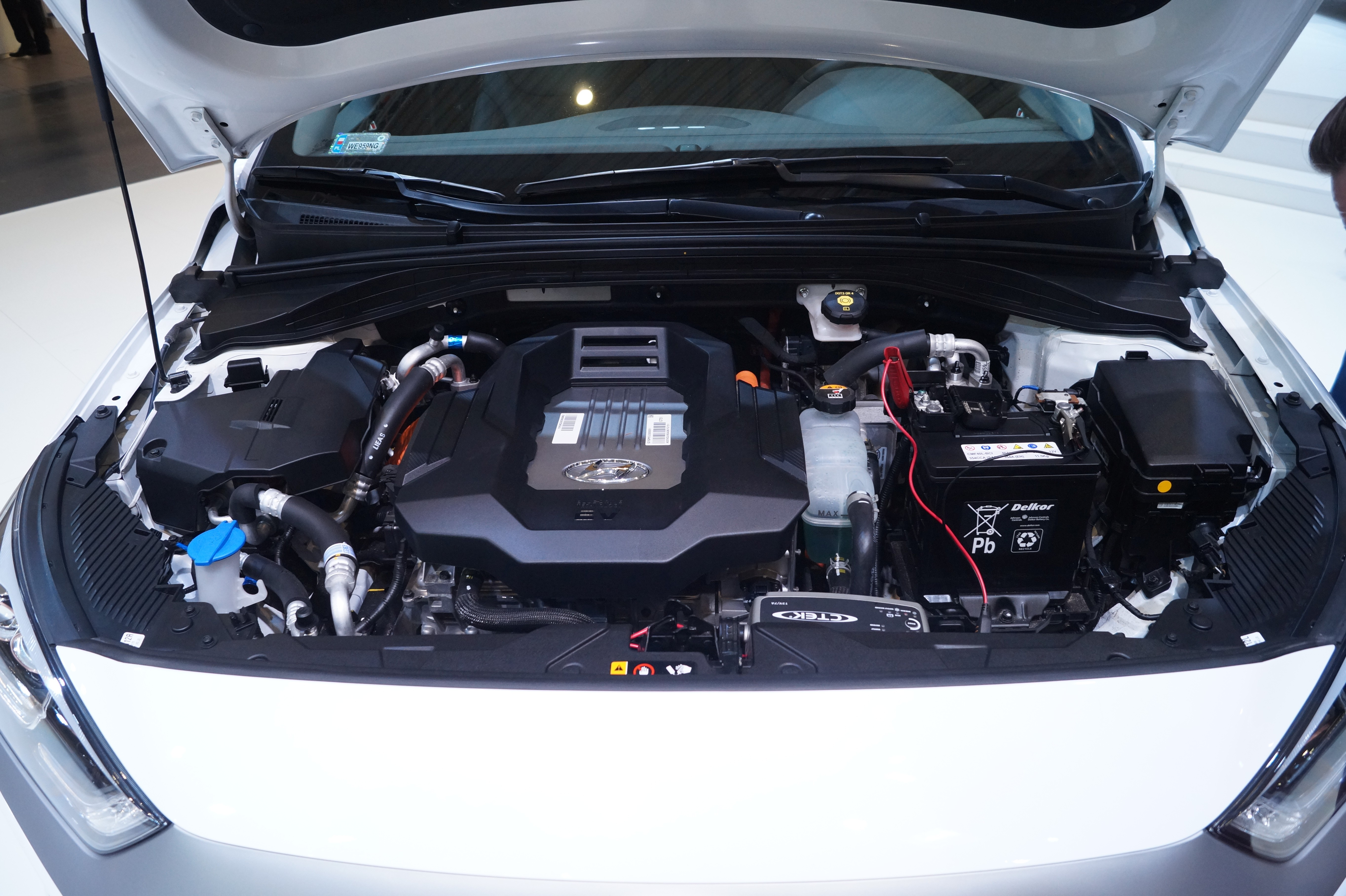
Ioniq Electric power control unit on top of the electric motor

Under the U.S. Environmental Protection Agency (EPA) four cycle test, the 2017 Ioniq Electric combined fuel economy rating is 136 mpg‑e (24.8 kWh/100 mi; 15.4 kWh/100 km). For city driving, it is rated at 150 mpg‑e (22 kWh/100 mi; 14 kWh/100 km), and for highway it is rated at 122 mpg‑e (28 kWh/100 mi; 17.2 kWh/100 km).

With these ratings, the Ioniq Electric became in November 2016 the most efficient EPA certified vehicle considering all fuels and of all years, surpassing the 2014–2016 model year BMW i3, and also the 2017 Toyota Prius Prime, the most energy efficient plug in hybrid in EV mode. Similarly the Ioniq Electric was praised by the Green NCAP for high energy efficiency, even under high-load highway test.

Green NCAP test results Hyundai Ioniq (2019) 4x2 electric automatic
Test	Points
Overall:	5 /5 stars
Clean Air Index: 10/10: good / Laboratory Tests / HC / CO / NOx / PN; 9.0/9 / Cold test / good / good / good / good; 3.0/3 / Warm test / good / good / good / good; 3.0/3 / Eco Mode / good / good / good / good; 3.0/3 / Sport Mode / good / good / good / good; 9.0/9 / Highway / good / good / good / good; good / Road Test / HC / CO / NOx / PN; 7.0/7 / On-Road Drive / n.a. / good / good / good; good / Robustness
Energy Efficiency Index: 8.5/10: good / Laboratory Tests / Energy Efficiency; 10.0/10 / Cold test / good; 3.0/3 / Warm test / good; 3.0/3 / Eco Mode / good; 3.0/3 / Sport Mode / good; 10.0/10 / Highway / good

Range from the relatively modest battery was increased by the vehicle's efficiency, which in turn was aided by aerodynamic tweaks and low-rolling resistance tires. The 2017 Ioniq Electric had a combined EPA rated range of 124 mi (200 km). Hyundai originally expected the Ioniq to deliver a range of 110 mi (180 km). The range under the New European Driving Cycle (NEDC) standard is 280 km (170 mi), and 169 km (105 mi) under the South Korean cycle. In 2019 (2020 model year), the battery capacity was increased to 38.3 kW-hr, lengthening the range to 170 mi (270 km) (EPA) or 311 km (193 mi) (WLTP).

Charging time is rated at 4 hours on a 6.6 kW AC charger. Using a DC fast charging station, the battery can be restored to 80% state of charge in approximately half an hour. Along with the larger battery, the onboard AC charger was upgraded from 6.6 kW to 7.2 kW with the 2020 model year Ioniq Electric.

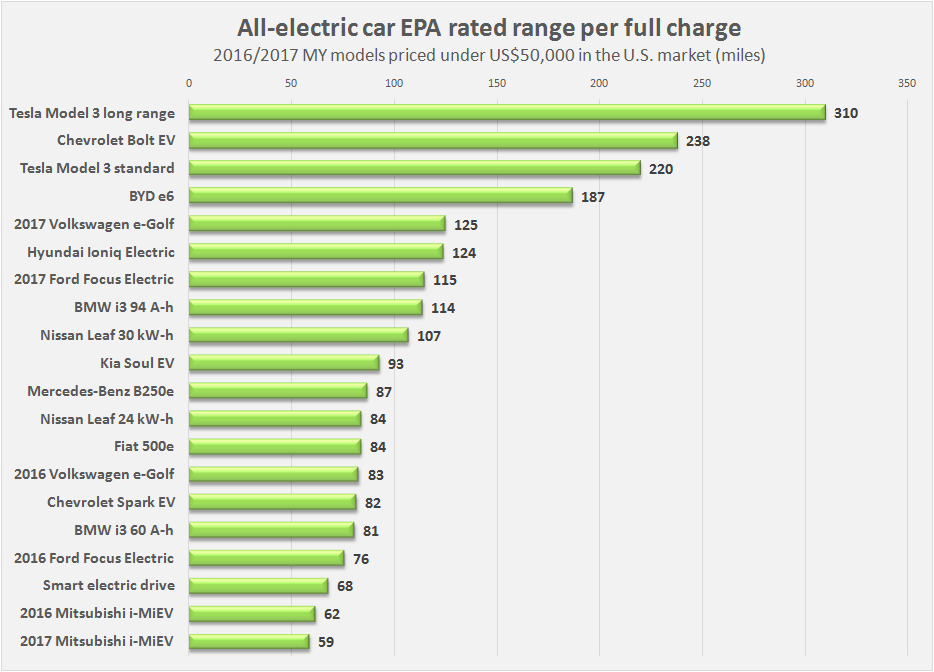
Comparison of EPA-rated range for electric cars rated up until July 2017 and priced under US$50,000 in the U.S. Only model year 2016 and 2017 cars are included.

== Ioniq Plug-in ==
Ioniq Plug-in
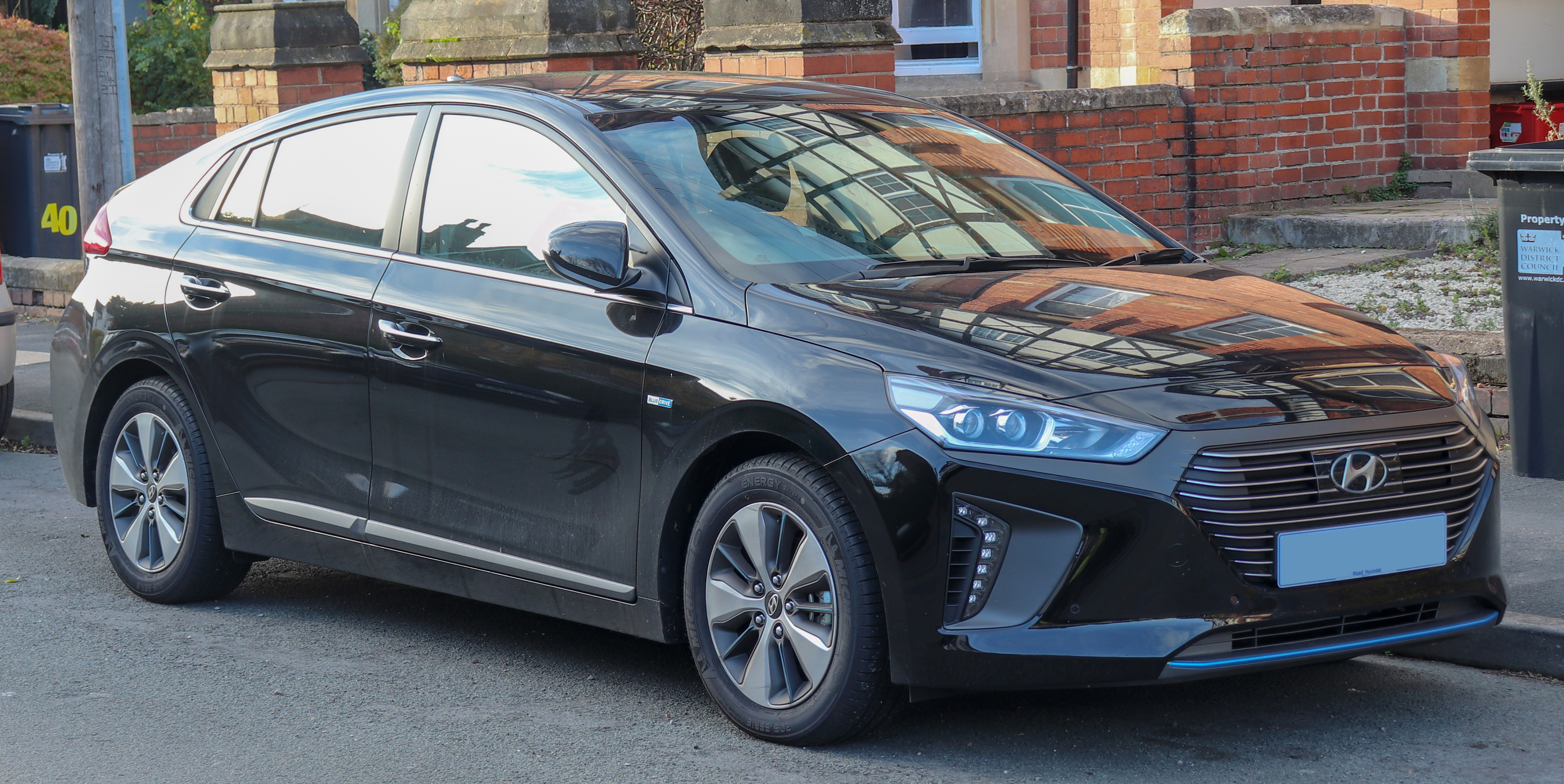

Powertrain
- Engine: 1.6 L Kappa II GDI PHEV I4
- Electric motor: 44.5 kW (59.7 hp) Permanent Magnet Synchronous Motor
- Power output: 78 kW (105 hp) (petrol engine)
- Transmission: 6-speed DCT
- Hybrid drivetrain: Plug-in hybrid
- Battery: 8.9 kWh lithium-ion polymer battery
- Electric range: 29 mi (47 km) (EPA)

Dimensions
- Curb weight: 1,495–1,551 kg (3,296–3,419 lb)

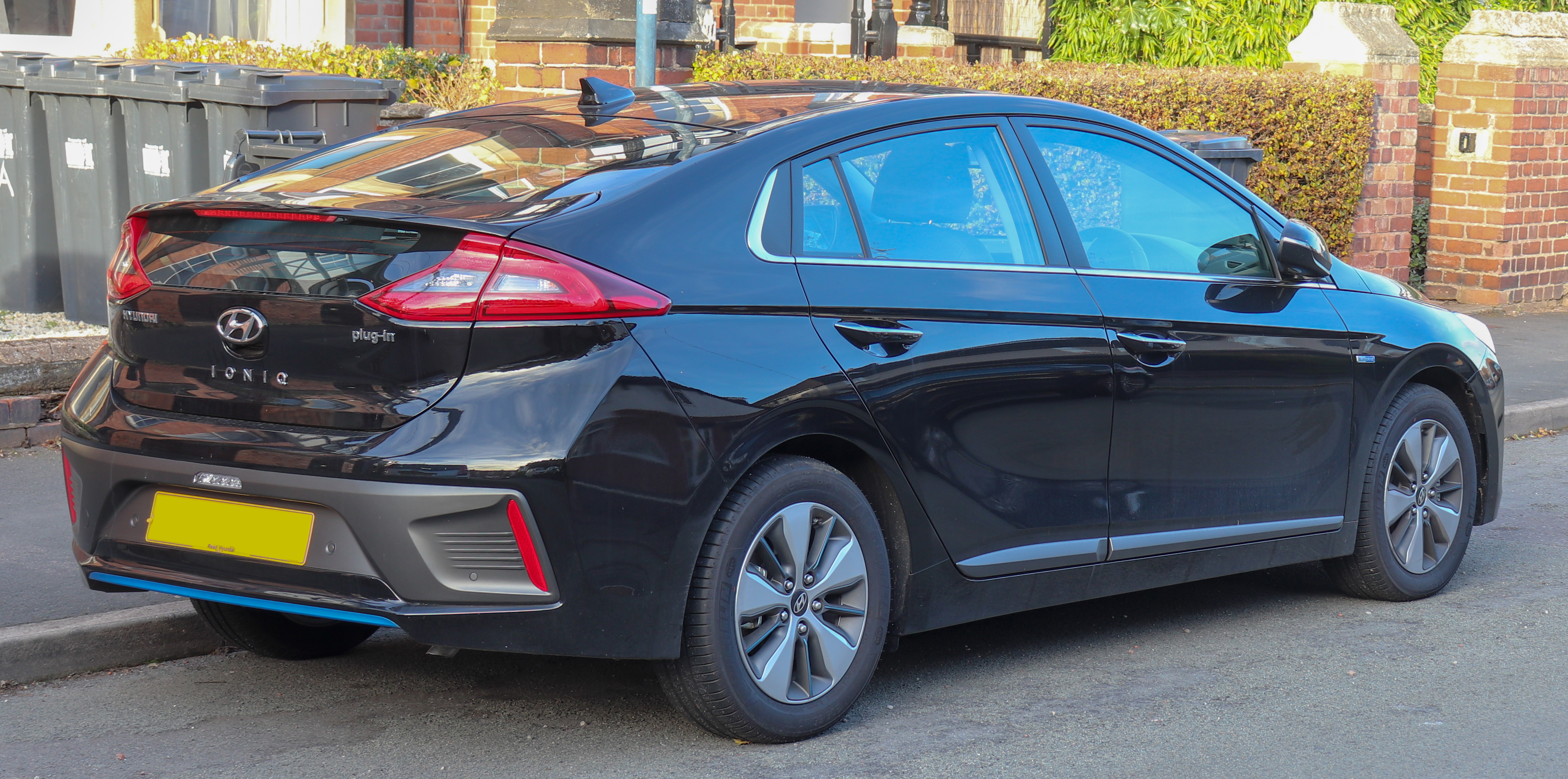
Rear view (pre-facelift)

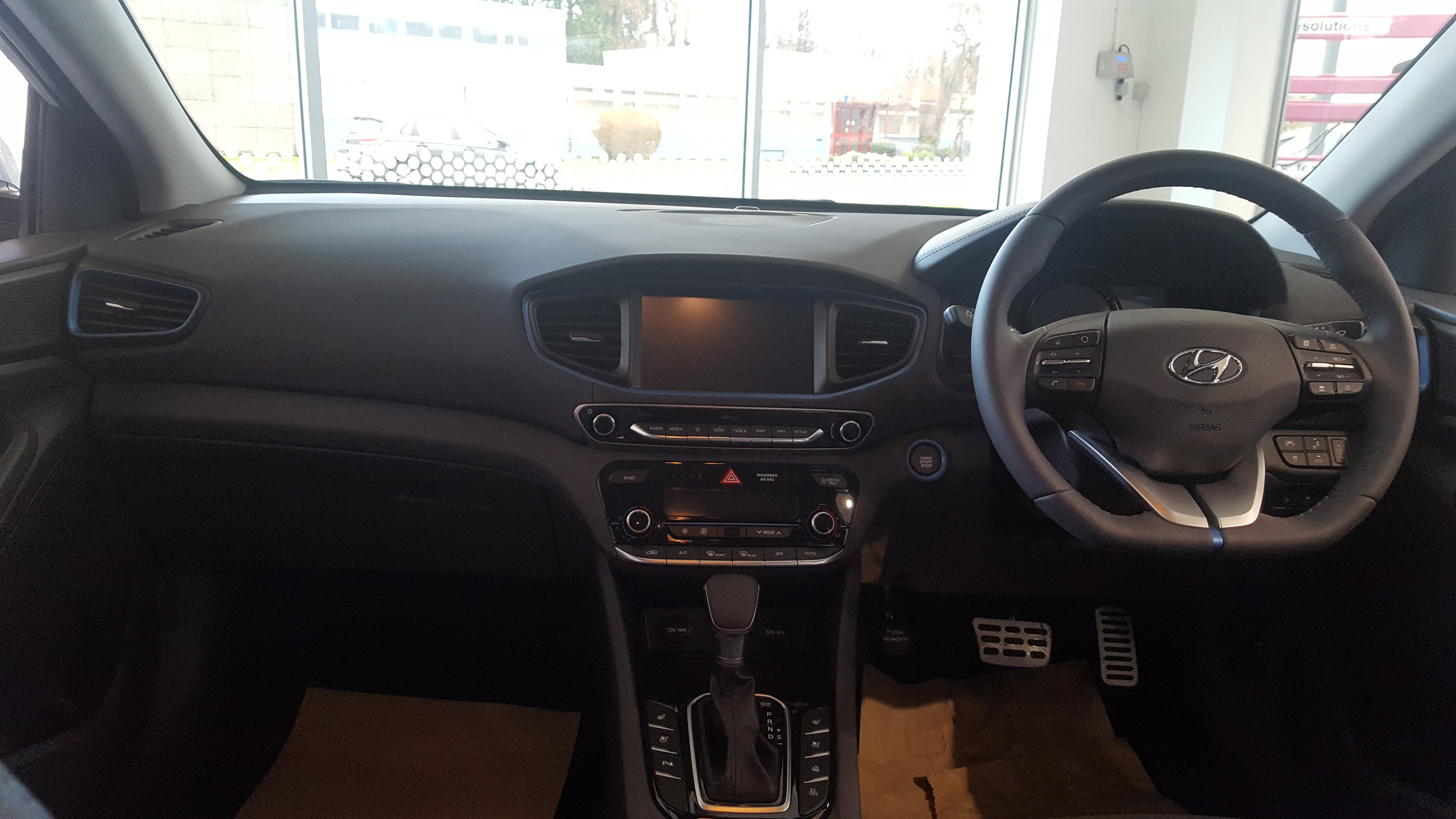
Interior (pre-facelift)

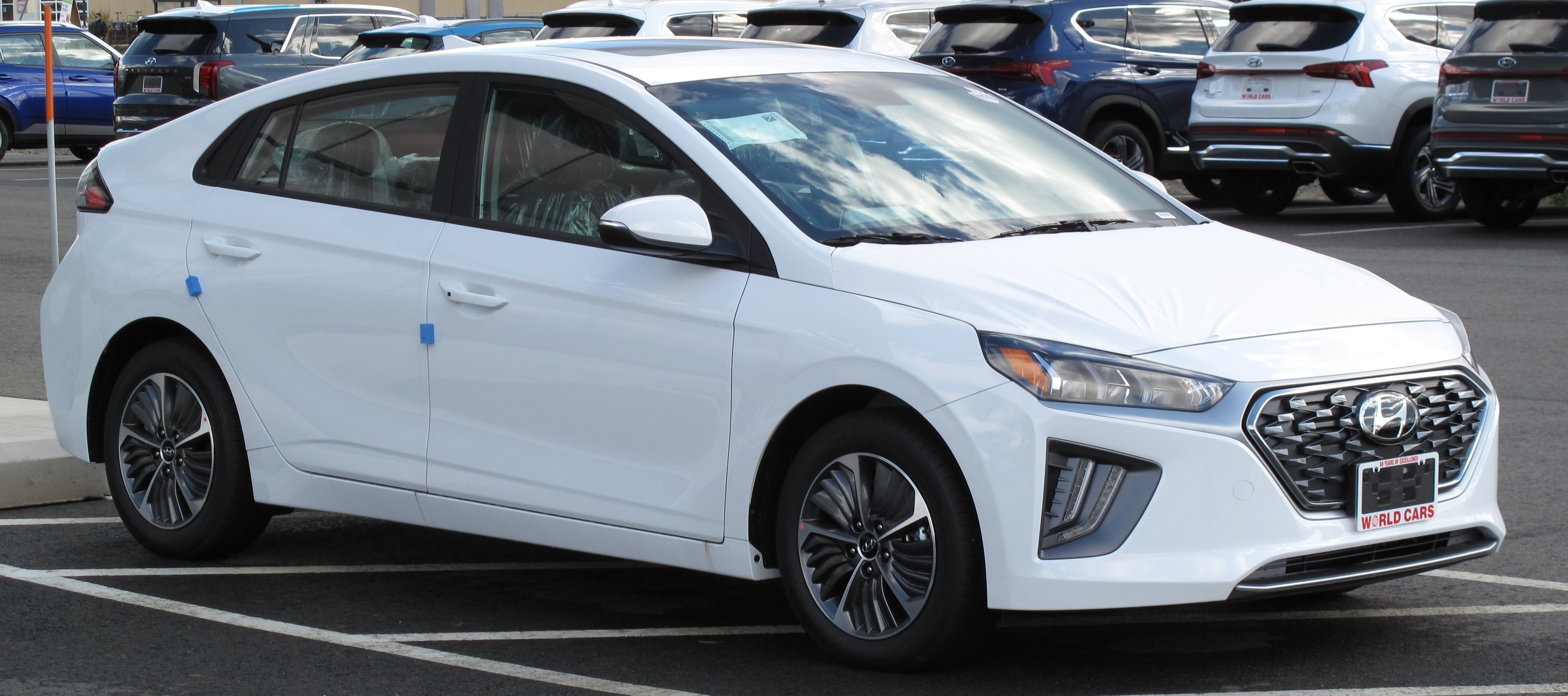

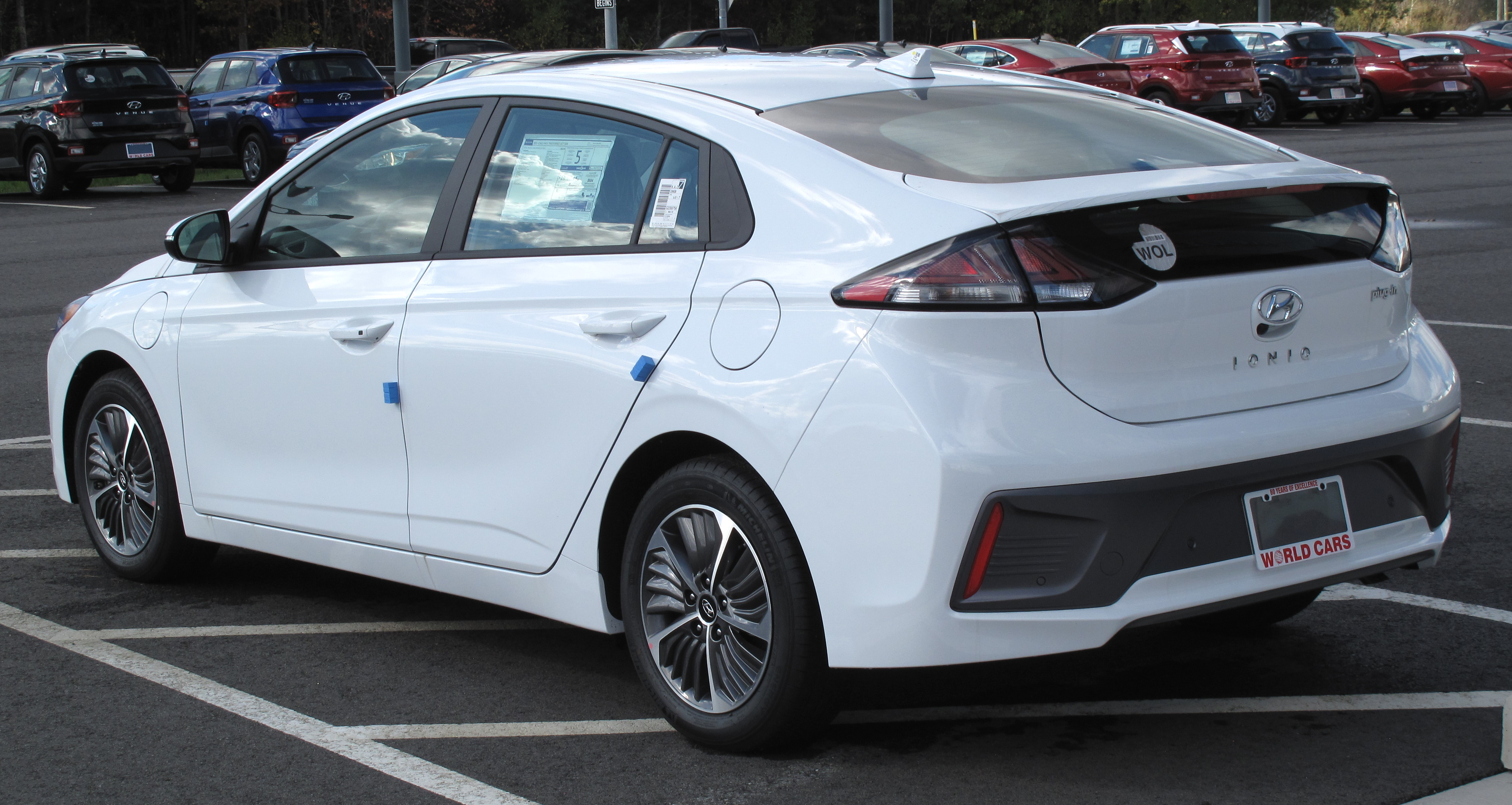
Facelift

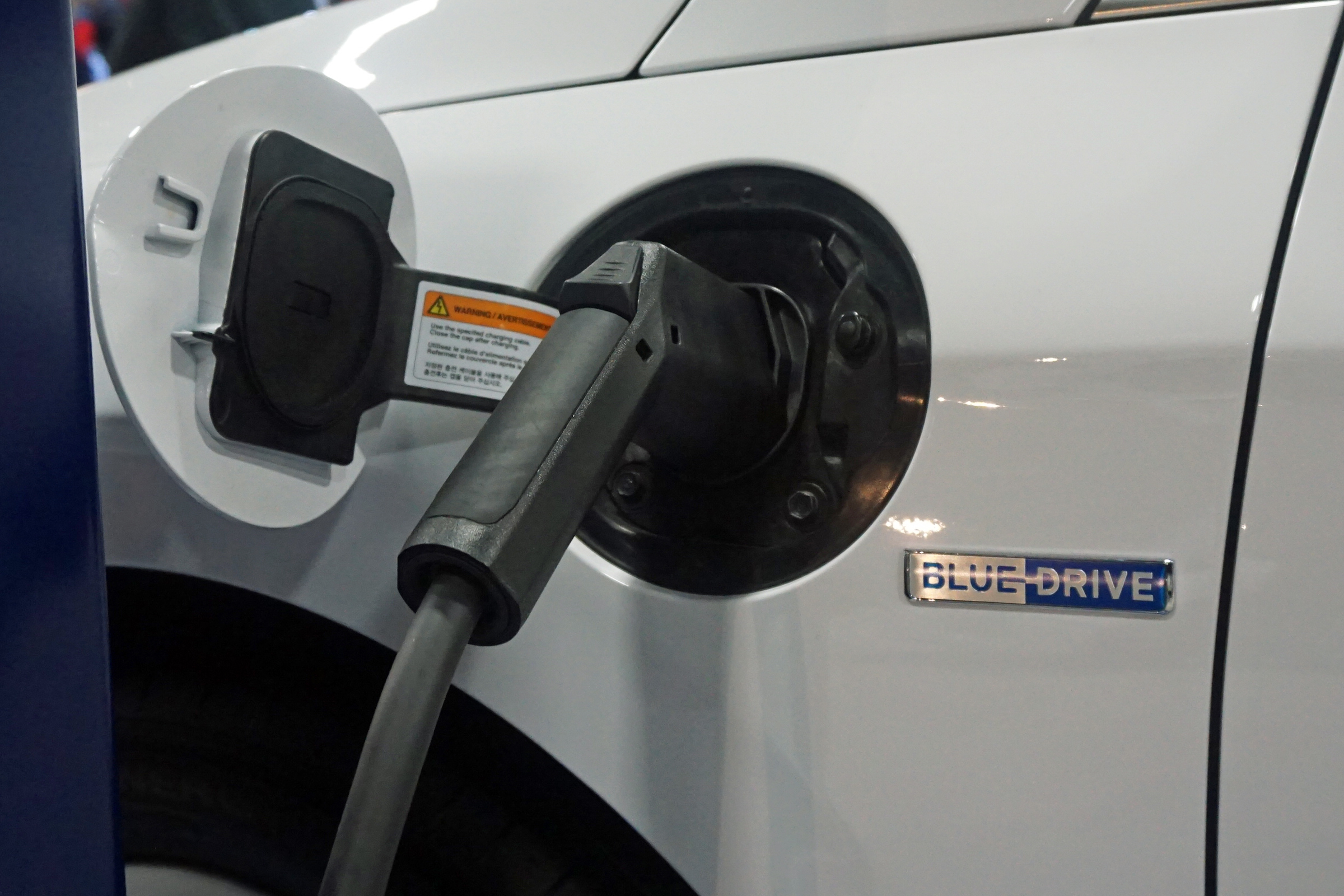
The Ioniq plug-in charging port is located on the left side of the vehicle.

The plug-in hybrid variant was released in February 2017.

The Ioniq Plug-in uses a similar hybrid electric drivetrain as the regular Ioniq Hybrid, which combines the same 1.6-L GDI four-cylinder Kappa engine as the Hybrid, rated at 40% thermal efficiency and an output of 78 kW (105 hp) and 150 N⋅m (111 lbf⋅ft), with a slightly more powerful electric motor that develops 45 kW (60 hp) and 170 N⋅m (125 lbf⋅ft). Compared to the regular Hybrid, the Plug-in also has a larger 8.9 kWh lithium-ion polymer traction battery capable of delivering an EPA-rated electric-only range of 29 mi (47 km), and an additional 601 mi (967 km) of range in hybrid mode once the electric range has been depleted. The EPA efficiency rating for the Ioniq Plug-in hybrid in electric mode is 119 mpg‑e (28 kWh/100 mi; 17.6 kWh/100 km).

In ECO mode, the dual clutch transmission optimizes gear selection for efficiency, upshifting earlier to achieve better fuel economy. There is a charge-replenishing mode where the gasoline engine is used to recharge the traction battery - for example, when the combustion engine is being used for heating during cold season.

== Safety ==
ANCAP test results Hyundai Ioniq all New Zealand variants (2016, aligned with Euro NCAP)
Test	Points	%
Overall:	5 /5 stars	
Adult occupant:	34.9	91%
Child occupant:	39.3	80%
Pedestrian:	29.7	70%
Safety assist:	9.9	82%

ANCAP test results Hyundai Ioniq all variants (2016, aligned with Euro NCAP)
Test	Points	%
Overall:	5 /5 stars	
Adult occupant:	34.5	90%
Child occupant:	39.3	80%
Pedestrian:	29.7	70%
Safety assist:	8.4	70%

ASEAN NCAP test results Hyundai Ioniq Hybrid (2018)
Test	Points
Overall:	5 /5 stars
Adult occupant:	46.34
Child occupant:	21.48
Safety assist:	24.17

== Sales ==
By January 2021, from the Ioniq series around 325,500 units were sold worldwide, including 211,755 conventional hybrids and 77,972 purely electric cars, as well as 35,757 plug-in hybrid variants. From all units, 118,575 were sold to Europe and 60,354 to the USA. From the IONIQ electric model 36,772 units were sold to Europe; these are 47% or almost the half of the worldwide electric production.

== See also ==
- Government incentives for plug-in electric vehicles
- Hyundai Sonata PHEV
- List of electric cars currently available
- List of modern production plug-in electric vehicles
- Plug-in electric vehicle
- Hyundai Ioniq 5
- Hyundai Ioniq 6
- Ioniq
