= Calvin Luk =

Australian automotive designer

- Born: 1985 (age 40–41); Sydney
- Citizenship: Australian
- Education: Art Center College of Design
- Alma mater: Art Center College of Design Pasadena; University of Technology Sydney
- Occupation: Automotive Designer for BMW Design
- Employer: BMW Group (2008 - current)
- Known for: Exterior Design for BMW Group
- Notable work: Exterior Design for X1, 1 Series facelift (F20 LCI), X3 (G01), Z4 Concept and the current-generation Z4 (G29), BMW Concept Touring Coupe (Z4 Touring)

Calvin Luk is an Australian automotive designer working for BMW AG, where he is Creative Director for Automotive Design. Luk was once one of the youngest exterior designers for BMW group when he designed his first car, the BMW F48 X1. He has worked for BMW since 2008.

Luk is an Australian of Hong Kong descent. He got his automotive inspiration from his parents' E36 BMW 3 series. He also gets inspiration from listening to Evanescence.

== Education ==
Calvin studied first at the University of Technology Sydney before applying to the prestigious Art Center College of Design in Pasadena after getting advice from a BMW executive. He majored in transportation design.

== Notable Work ==
Luk is known for his work on the BMW X1 F48 design, the BMW 1 Series F20 LCI exterior design, the BMW X3 G01 exterior design. Luk is also well known for designing the BMW Z4 Concept, BMW G29 Z4 Roadster, and BMW Concept Touring Coupe.
