= Green NCAP =

Green vehicle assessment programme

Green NCAP is a green vehicle assessment programme hosted and supported by the European New Car Assessment Program (Euro NCAP) in cooperation with European Governments. The Organisation has test laboratories in eight European countries and aims to increase awareness of the environmental impact of the vehicles. The first set of results was released on 28 February 2019.

As of March 2019, the organisation considers only energy used while driving, however it plans to expand testing procedures further, in order to cover the entire life-cycle of the car as well as the range of the electric vehicles.

== Testing Procedure ==
Test is divided into two major stages. The first one is a test on the chassis dynamometer, adhering to the WLTP procedure, with a slight modification: temperature is set to 14 °C (57 °F), which is close to European average, and the vehicle has lights, air conditioning and other typical systems turned on, while also carrying a realistic payload. In total an equivalent five WLTP tests are conducted.

The second part includes road testing with portable emissions measurement system which adheres to the further expanded European Union's Real Driving Emissions. Expanded testing conditions include driving at altitudes from 0 to 1300 metres above sea level, and ambient temperatures from −7 to 35 °C (19 to 95 °F).

== Scoring ==
Scoring is divided into Overall Rating – between 0 and 5 stars – and two major groups: Clean Air Index and Energy Efficiency Index.

Clean Air Index covers air pollutant emissions for unburnt hydrocarbons (HC), carbon monoxide (CO), nitrogen oxides (NO_{x}) and particulates (PN) for each for the Laboratory Tests as well as the Road test.

Energy Efficiency Index covers energy efficiency of the entire vehicle, including aerodynamic drag, tyre friction or its mass. For even comparison with electric vehicles, fuel consumption is converted into kWh using calorific value.

Green NCAP additionally tests greenhouse gas emissions, however they are not a part of the rating.

== Life Cycle Assessment ==
In April 2022 Green NCAP published their first Life Cycle Assessment of 61 European cars, estimating the CO_{2} emissions and primary energy demand associated with the car's production, usage and recycling. They assumed a vehicle lifetime of 16 years, a total driven distance of 240,000 km (149,000 miles) and forecast the average energy mix of the 27 European Union member states plus the United Kingdom.

Various news outlets reported on the results showing that larger electric vehicles could have life cycle emissions similar to or greater than internal combustion-engined vehicles or hybrids. However, several assumptions made by the study, and by the tool by Joanneum Research used in the study, have been criticised. These allegedly include using outdated emissions estimates on battery production, overly high production emissions for electric vehicles, and unrealistic tests for energy use.

The battery production emission estimates were reviewed by Joanneum Research and could be traced back to a problem with a data interface, and clarifications on the testing procedures were provided by Green NCAP.

In December 2022 Green NCAP published an interactive "Life Cycle Assessment (LCA) Tool for Consumers", allowing to compare LCA values of different cars in relation to their country, energy mix and usage.
