= Mini Clubman =

Mini Clubman may refer to:

- BL Mini Clubman, the 1969–1980 British Leyland Mini Clubman
- Morris Mini Clubman, the Australian version of the BL Mini Clubman
- Mini Clubman (2007), the BMW Mini Clubman 2007–2024
