= Mini Aceman =

Small electric family car

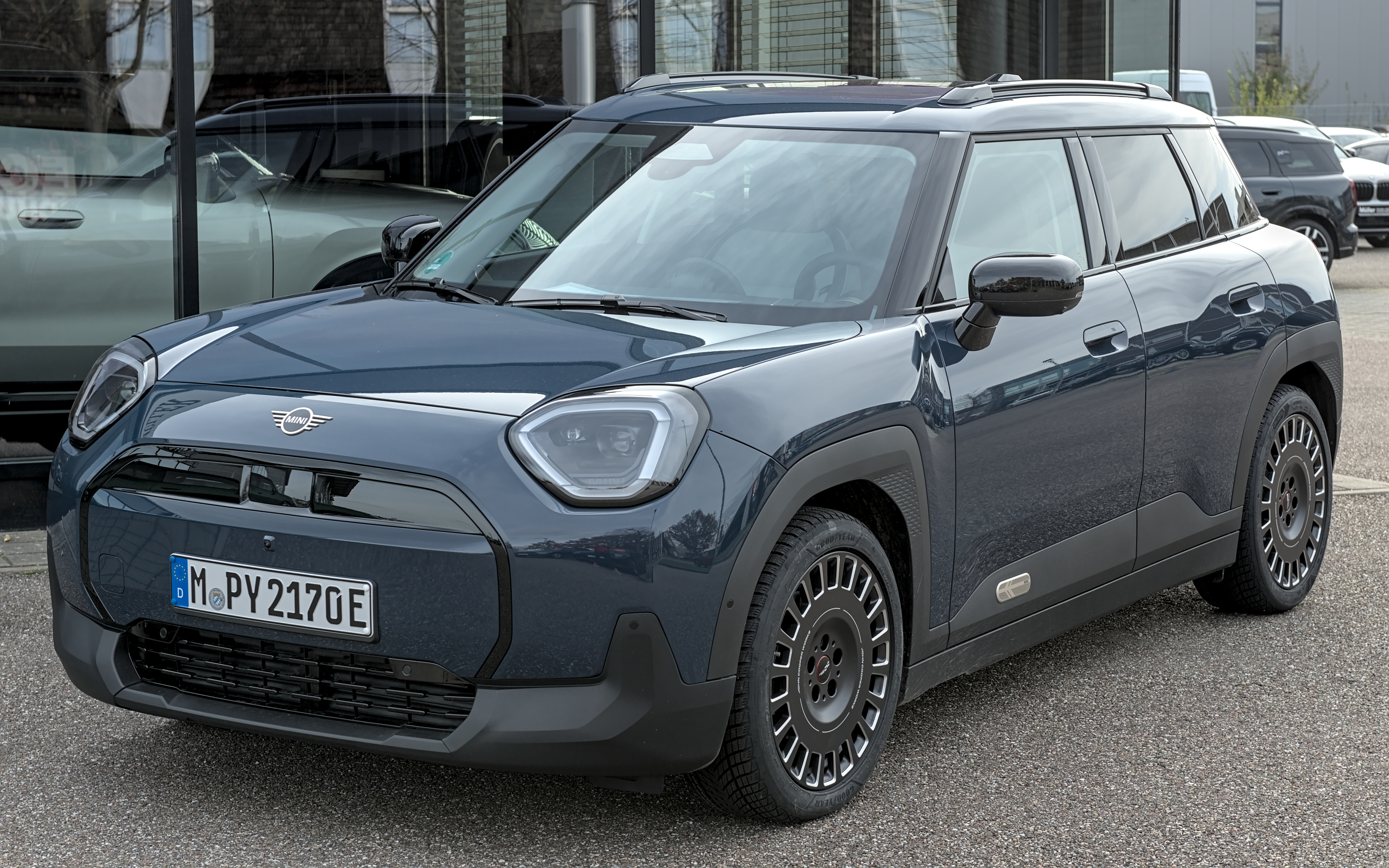

Overview
- Manufacturer: BMW (Mini)
- Model code: J05
- Production: 2024–present
- Assembly: China: Zhangjiagang (Spotlight Automotive)
- Designer: Oliver Heilmer

Body and chassis
- Class: Small family car
- Body style: 5-door hatchback
- Layout: Front-motor, front-wheel-drive
- Related: Mini Cooper Electric (J01)

Powertrain
- Electric motor: Permanent magnet synchronous
- Power output: 135 kW (181 hp; 184 PS) (Aceman E); 160 kW (215 hp; 218 PS) (Aceman SE); 190 kW (255 hp; 258 PS) (JCW Electric)
- Battery: 42.5 kWh lithium-ion (Aceman E); 54.2 kWh lithium-ion (Aceman SE / JCW Electric)

Dimensions
- Wheelbase: 2,606 mm (102.6 in)
- Length: 4,076 mm (160.5 in)
- Width: 1,754 mm (69.1 in)
- Height: 1,515 mm (59.6 in)

Chronology
- Predecessor: Mini Clubman

The Mini Aceman is a battery electric small family car which has been made in China and sold by German carmaker BMW under the Mini brand since 2024. The Aceman was developed and is produced by Spotlight Automotive, a joint venture between the BMW Group of Germany and Great Wall Motor, at a manufacturing plant in Zhangjiagang, Jiangsu.

== Concept ==
The Mini Aceman was revealed as concept car on 26 July 2022, previewing a new design language for the Mini marque.

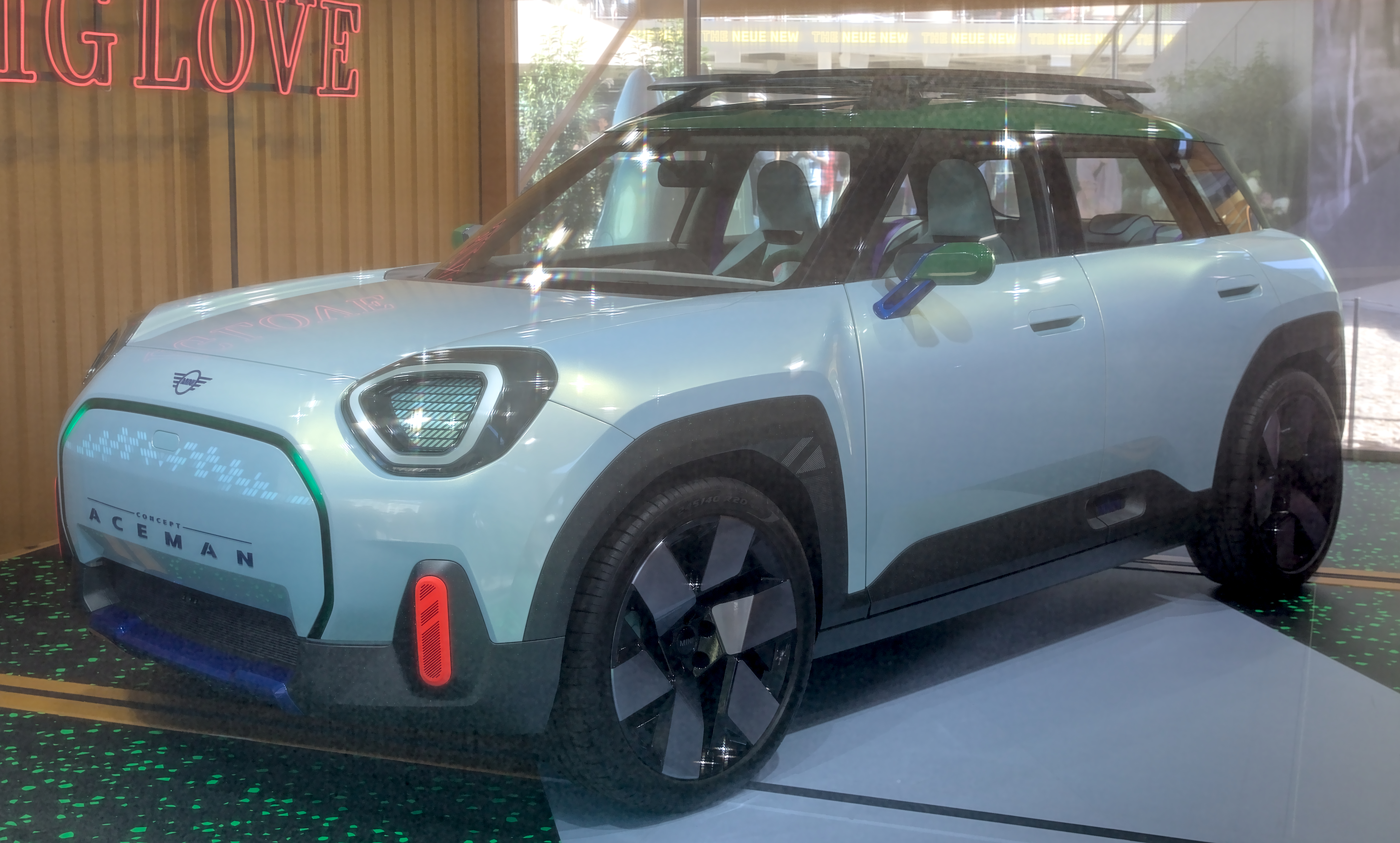
Mini Aceman Concept

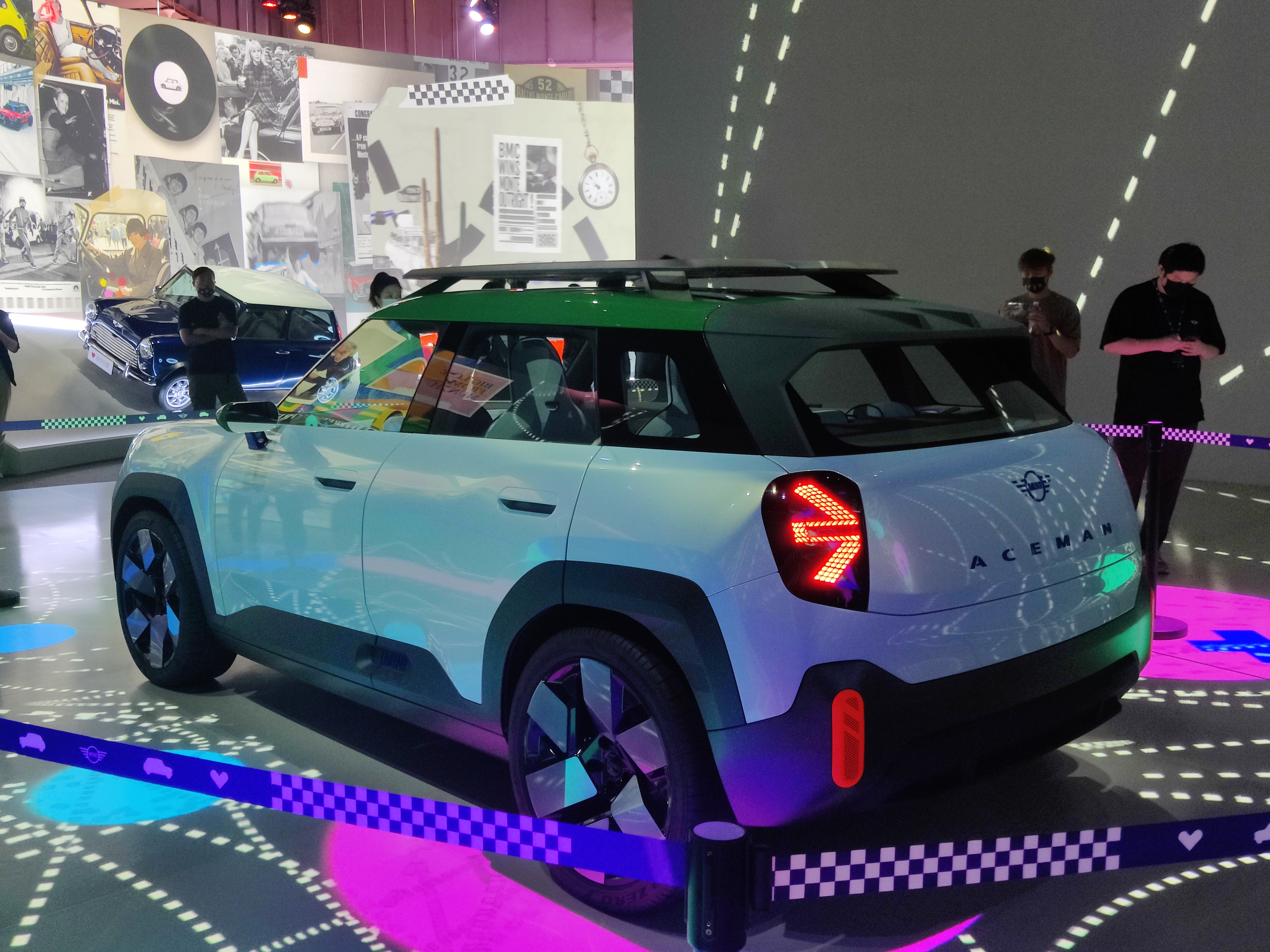
Rear view

The Aceman is positioned under the larger compact-class Countryman SUV.

In August 2022 at the Gamescom video games convention in Cologne, Germany, Mini showcased a Pokémon-themed Aceman concept encased in 1:1 scale toy car packaging. Attendees could purchase a small scale model of this vehicle in identical packaging.

== Production version ==
The production version of the Mini Aceman was unveiled in April 2024 at the Beijing Auto Show. The Aceman comes exclusively with battery electric powertrains, with two options available. Four trims are offered, which are Essential, Classic, Favored, and JCW.

The Aceman share design elements from the Cooper J01 and Countryman. The headlights and matrix rear lights have three different modes for the LED graphics. There are matte black lower sills and standard roof rails to resemble a crossover SUV instead of a tall hatchback.

The interior is similar to the Cooper J01. There is a 9.4-inch touchscreen (operated by MINI OS9), which is the only interior screen and control most of the vehicle functions, plus a few toggle switches for the essential functions. Mini's new Intelligent Personal Assistant called "Spike" debuted in the Aceman, with eight selectable Mini Experience Modes. The dashboard is covered with knitted material and the door cards are made from recycled polyester.

Despite its small dimensions, Mini designers made use of the “Clever Use of Space” design principle, therefore the Aceman has 300 L (11 cu ft) of boot space, which can be increased to 1,005 L (35.5 cu ft) when the rear seats are folded.

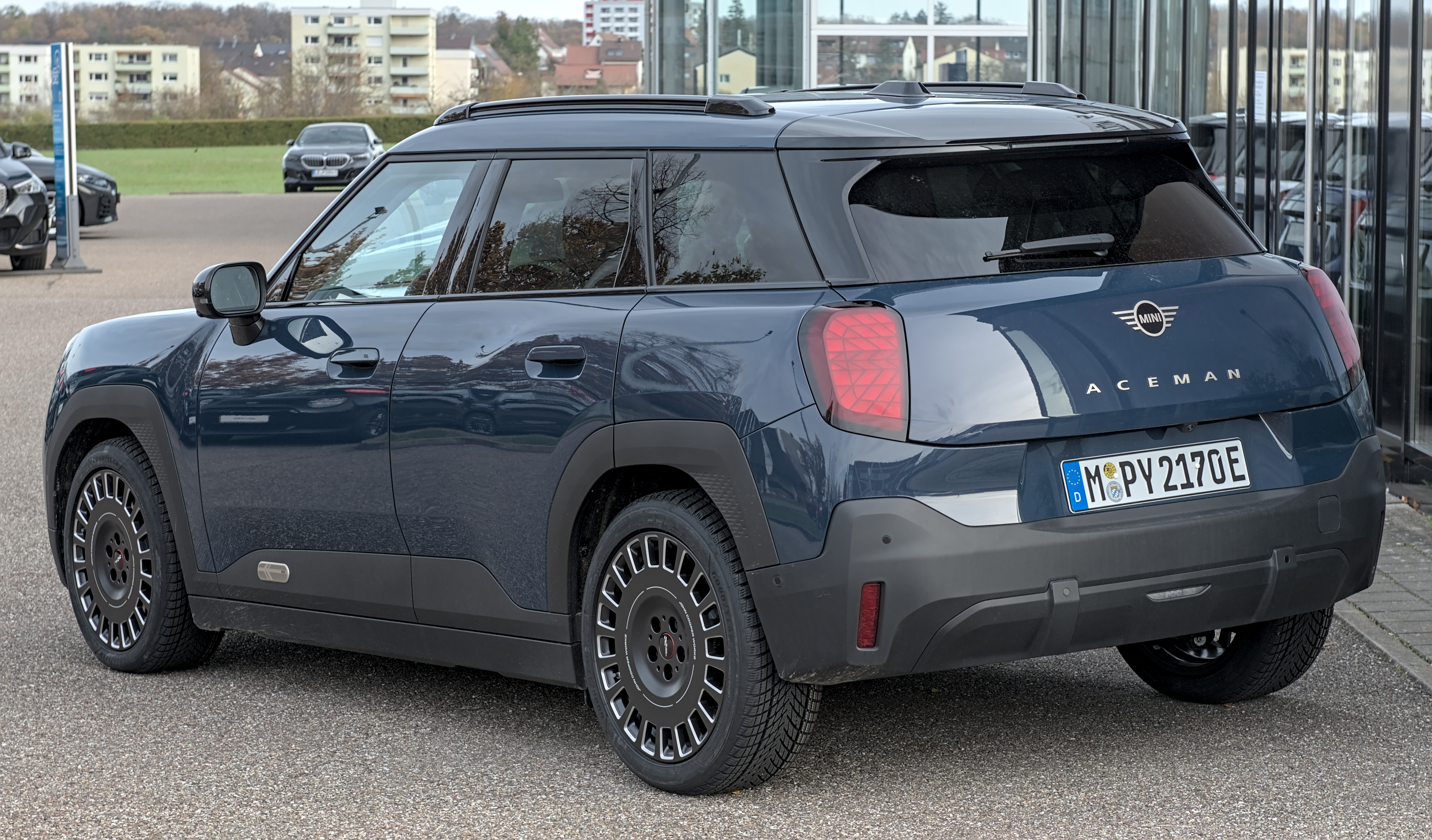
Aceman E Rear view Favored Trim

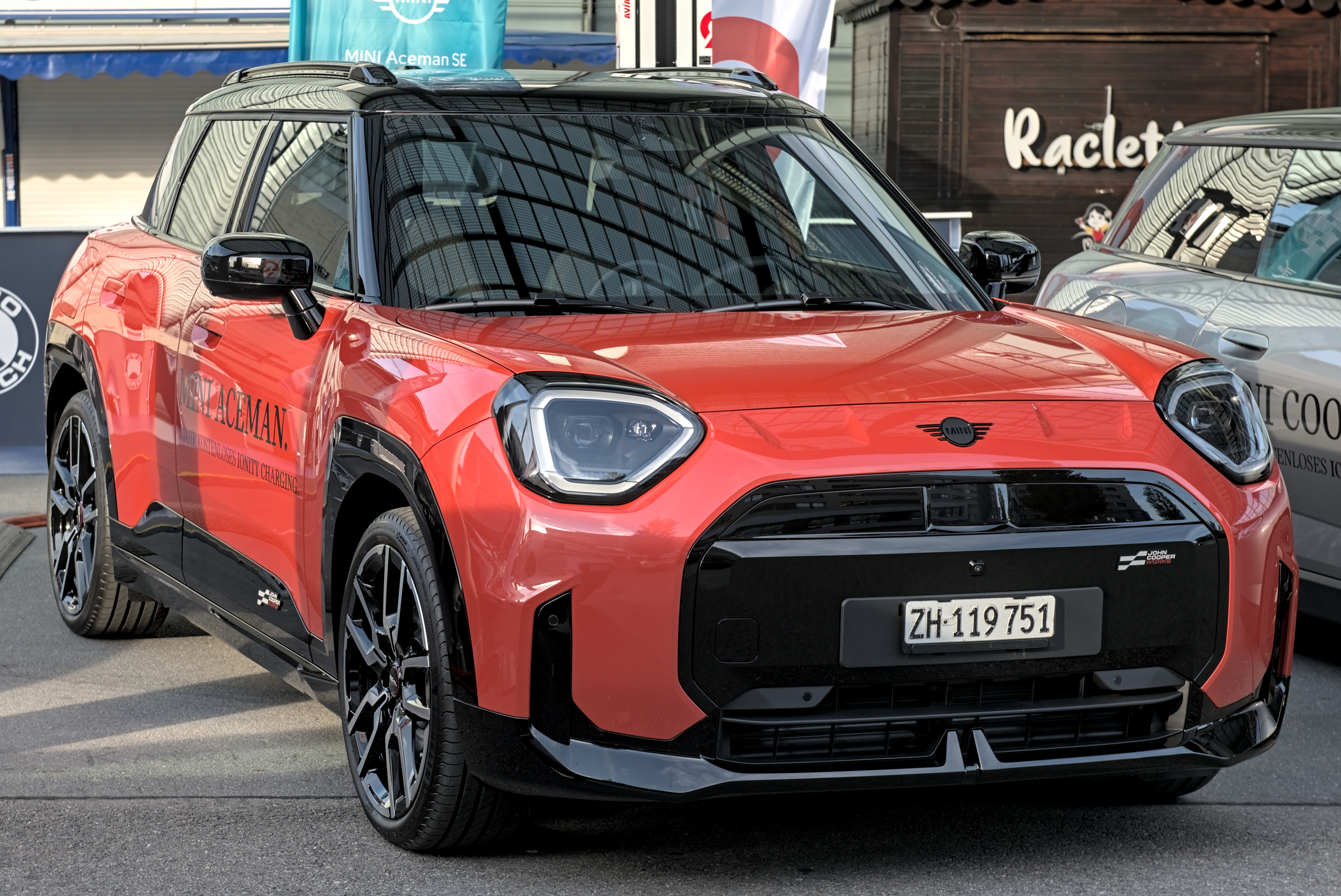
Aceman JCW-Style

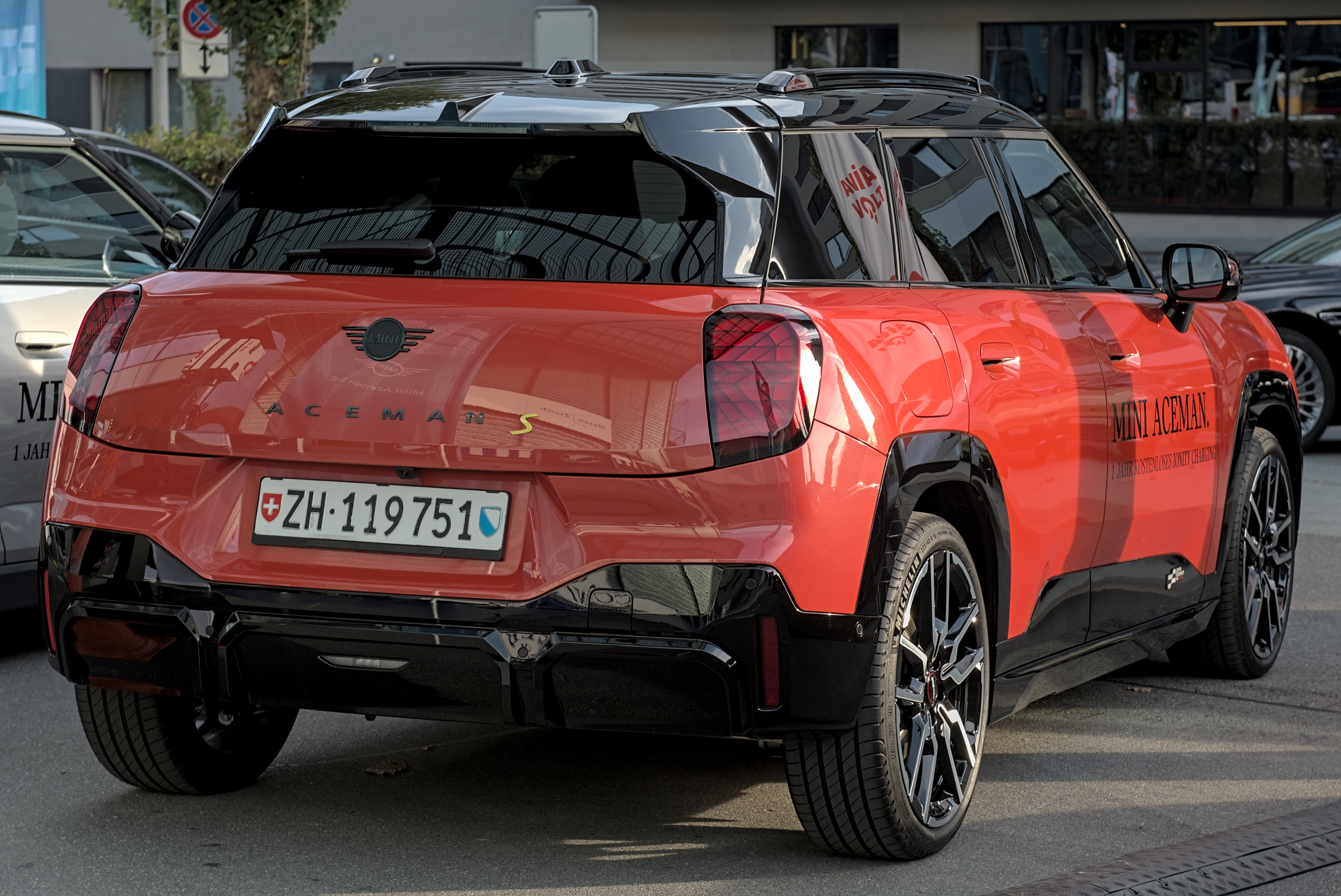
Rear view

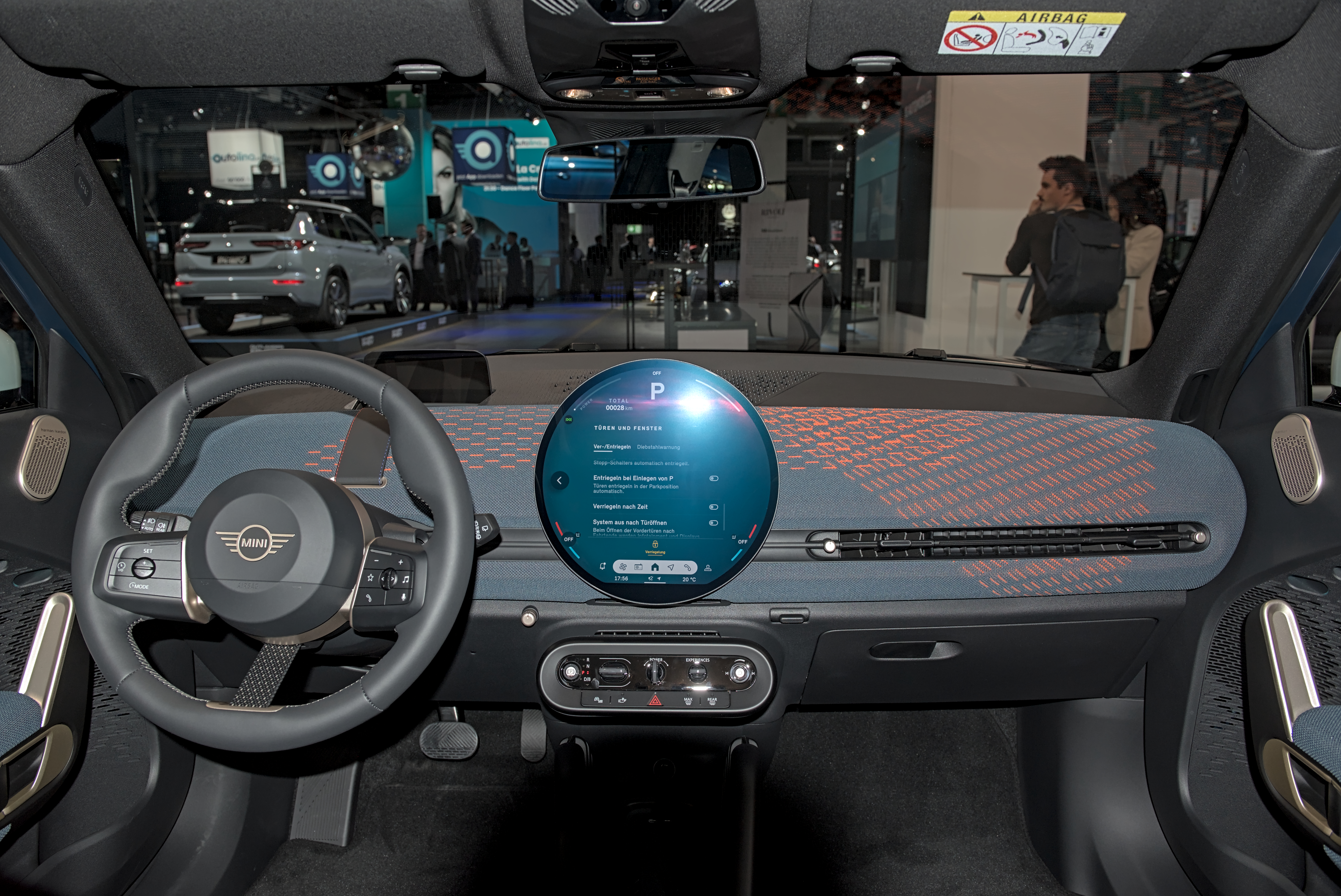
Interior JCW-Style

=== Safety ===
Euro NCAP test results MINI Aceman SE 'Classic' (LHD) (2025)
| Test | Points | % |
|---|---|---|
| Overall: | 5 /5 stars | |
| Adult occupant: | 33.4 | 83% |
| Child occupant: | 43.0 | 87% |
| Pedestrian: | 48.7 | 77% |
| Safety assist: | 14.4 | 79% |

ANCAP test results Mini Aceman (2025, aligned with Euro NCAP)
| Test | Points | % |
|---|---|---|
| Overall: | 5 /5 stars | |
| Adult occupant: | 35.35 | 83% |
| Child occupant: | 42.81 | 87% |
| Pedestrian: | 48.68 | 77% |
| Safety assist: | 15.06 | 83% |

== Sales ==
| Year | China | | |
| Year | Aceman | JCW | Total |
|---|---|---|---|
| 2024 | 2,110 | — | 2,110 |
| 2025 | 3,060 | 159 | 3,219 |
