= Mini Clubman (2007) =

Subcompact luxury car by BMW, 2007–2024

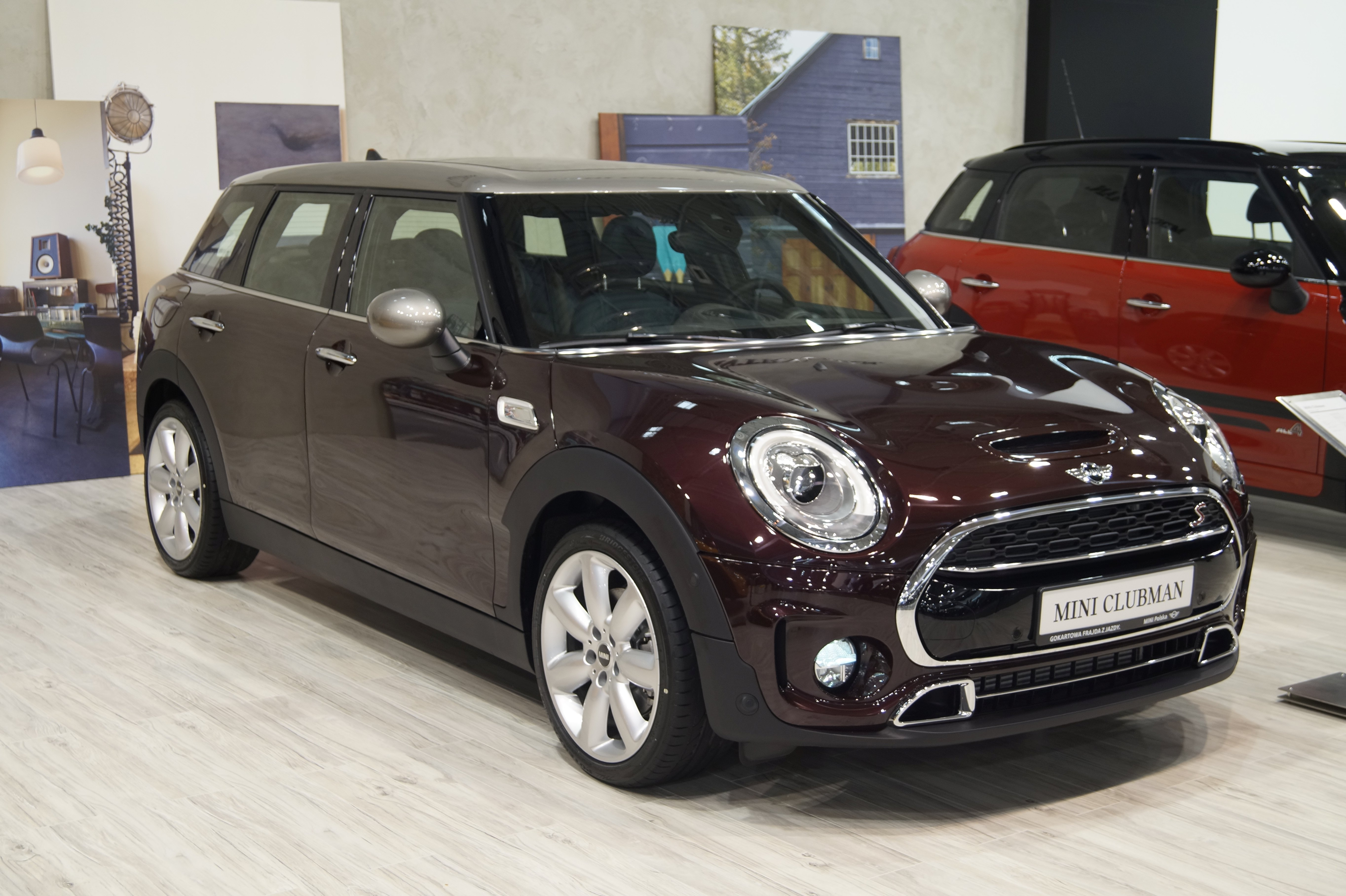

Overview
- Manufacturer: BMW (Mini)
- Production: 2007–2024

Body and chassis
- Class: Subcompact executive car

Chronology
- Successor: Mini Aceman

The Mini Clubman is a subcompact executive estate car engineered and manufactured by German automaker BMW and sold under the Mini marque. The first-generation Clubman was introduced in 2007, as a variant of the Mini Hatch. A panel van version called Clubvan was added to the range in 2012. The current second-generation model has been in production since 2015 and available with front- and all-wheel drive.

== History ==
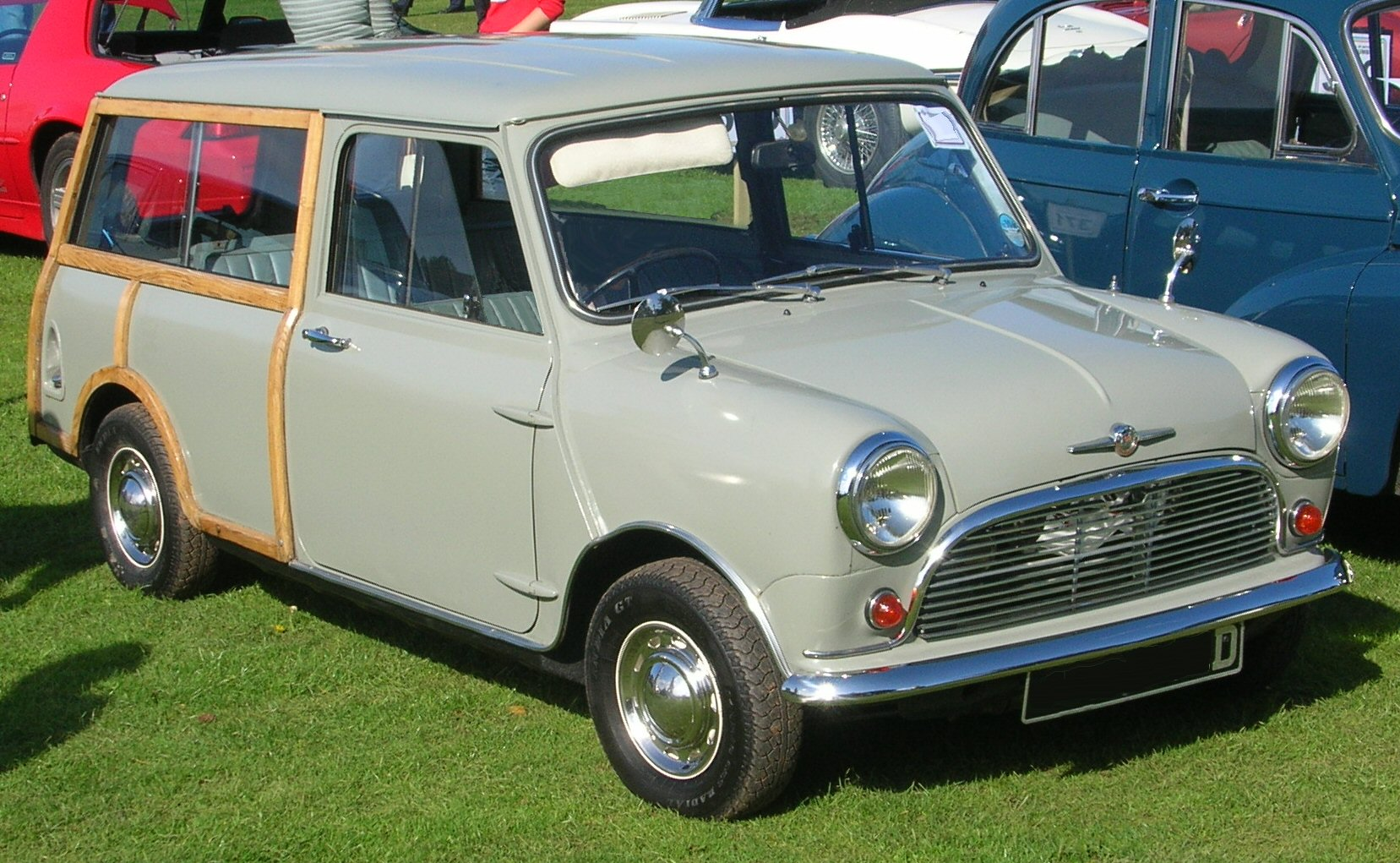
Morris Mini Minor Traveller (1966)

The use of the name "Clubman" is a departure from Mini tradition. "Clubman" was originally the name given to the 1970s facelift of the classic Mini, which mostly resulted in a squared-off front end, whereas the classic Mini estates had traditionally been named "Traveller" or "Countryman". However, BMW did not initially purchase the rights to use those names, and so decided to call its larger-variant "Clubman", a name which it did own rights to.

Sketches of a new estate version of the Mini were shown at the 2000 Paris Motor Show, and a rendering of the estate concept (internally named EXT), wore the Clubman name on the licence plate. The Clubman started out in development based on the first generation Mini Hatch (R50) before changing to the second gen Hatch (R56).

== First generation (2007) ==
First generation
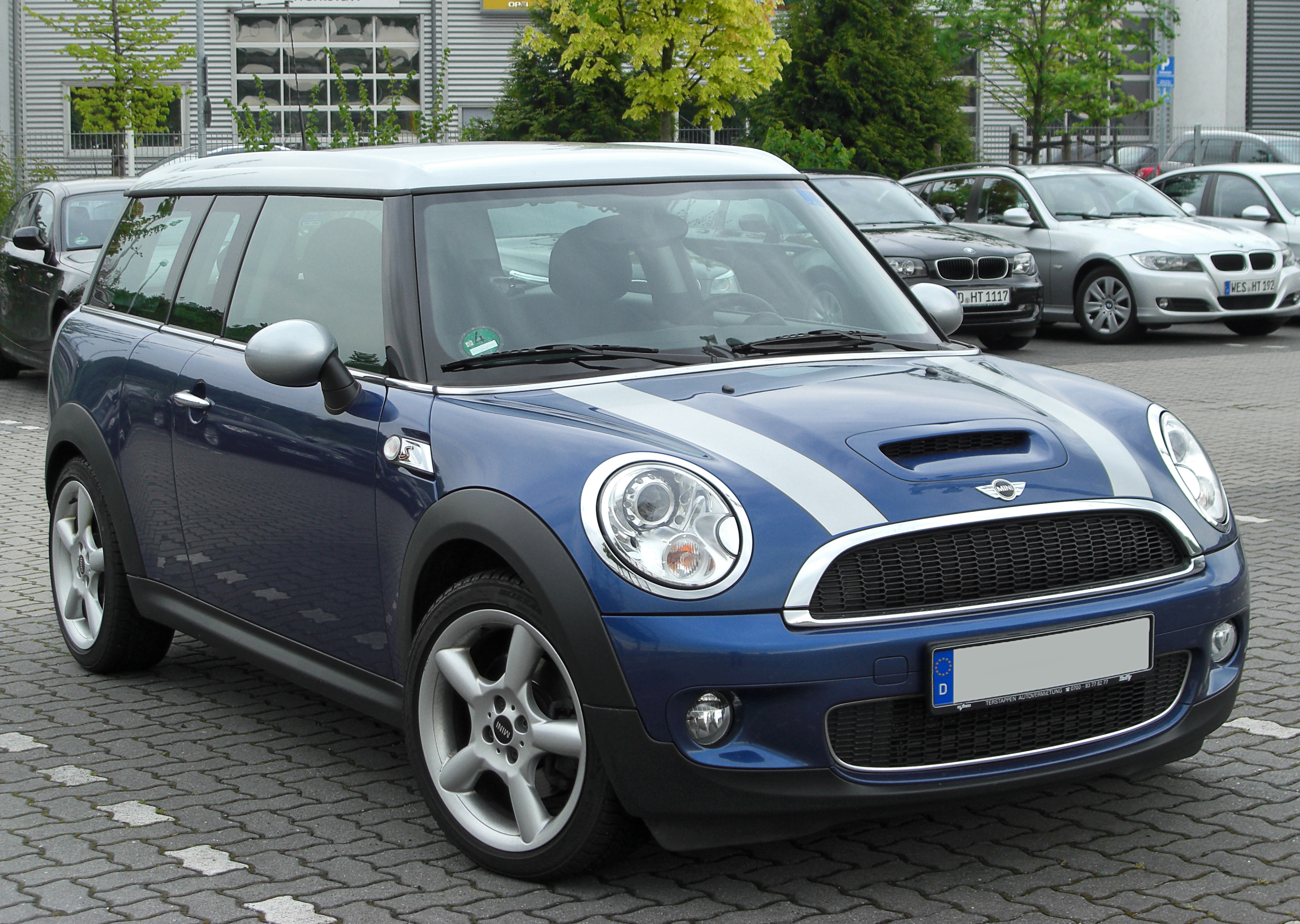

Overview
- Model code: R55
- Also called: Mini Clubvan
- Production: 2007 – June 2014
- Assembly: United Kingdom: Cowley, Oxfordshire (Plant Oxford)
- Designer: Gert Hildebrand

Body and chassis
- Body style: 5-door estate (Clubman) car derived van (Clubvan)
- Layout: Front engine, front-wheel drive
- Related: Mini Hatch

Powertrain
- Engine: Petrol: 1.4 L N12B14 I4 (One); 1.6 L N12B16 I4 (One/Cooper); 1.6 L N14B16A turbo I4 (Cooper S); 1.6 L N18B16A turbo I4 (Cooper S); Diesel: 1.6 L DV6 turbo I4 (Cooper D); 1.6 L N47D16 turbo I4 (One/Cooper D); 2.0 L N47D20 turbo I4 (Cooper SD)
- Transmission: 6-speed automatic 6-speed manual

Dimensions
- Wheelbase: 2,548 mm (100.3 in)
- Length: 2008–2010: 3,937 mm (155.0 in); 2008–2010 S: 3,957 mm (155.8 in); 2011–2014: 3,960 mm (155.9 in)
- Width: 1,684 mm (66.3 in)
- Height: 1,425 mm (56.1 in); S: 1,433 mm (56.4 in)
- Kerb weight: 1,205 kg (2,657 lb)

=== Design ===
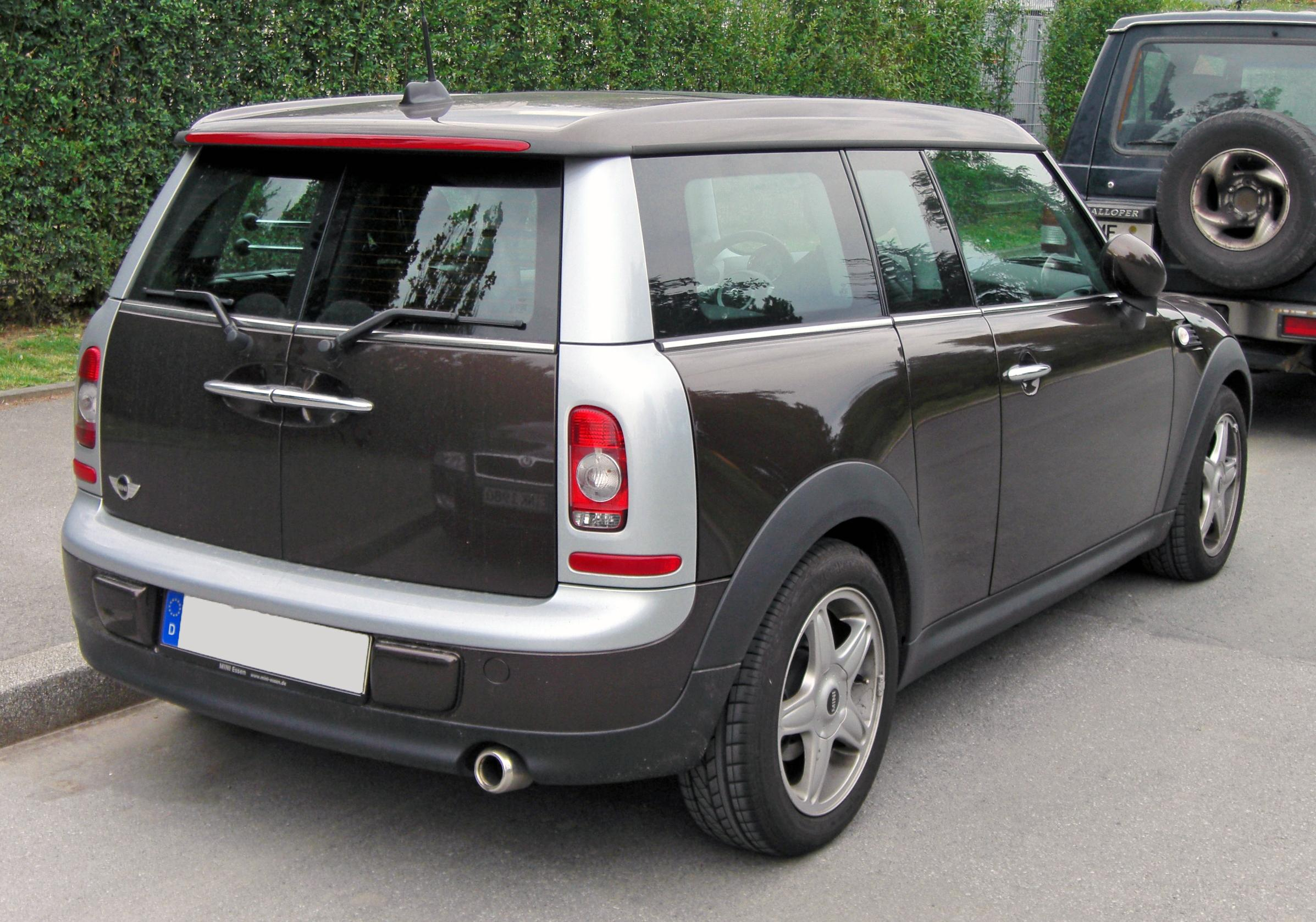
Mini Clubman

Identical to the 3-door hatchback from the B-pillar forward, the Clubman features a length increased by 240 mm (9.4 in), an 80 mm (3.1 in) longer wheelbase, increased rear-seat leg room and cargo space deeper by 160 mm (6.3 in), providing an increased 260 litres (9.2 cu ft) of space – growing from a total of 680 to 920 litres (24 to 32 cu ft) with the rear seats folded. The Clubman model weighs 64 kilograms (141 lb) more than its two-door counterpart.

The Clubman features access to its cargo space via bi-parting rear doors, known as barn doors or splitdoors. The passenger doors configuration and split rear cargo doors of the Clubman made it a unique model on the market at the time of release. Also, all Clubman models feature a single backwards opening side door to access the rear seats. The first generation was the first Mini to have a so-called suicide door, but the second generation does not have one. It is marketed singularly as the Clubdoor, and is always located on its right side of the body – irrespective of market. It is much smaller in comparison to the regular driver and passenger side doors. This in turn creates differences between right and left-hand drive markets. In right-hand drive markets, the steering wheel won't allow the driver's seat to fold and slide as far forward as the passenger seat. This means that left-hand drive models have better rear seat access. For right-hand drive markets, including the car's home market, the Clubdoor is located on the road side of the car, requiring rear passengers to exit into the road.

The model variants are the same as the Hatch/Hardtop version; being in available in One, Cooper, Cooper D, Cooper SD, Cooper S and John Cooper Works (JCW) variations.

In 2011, the special edition Hampton was unveiled and comprised a Reef Blue metallic paint with a black roof, black leather seats, Damson Red bonnet stripes and interior detailing and Anthracite instruments borrowed from the Mini John Cooper Works.

In 2013, the company unveiled the Clubman Bond Street, named after a prestigious shopping destination in the West End of London, featuring exclusive and stylish appointments inside and out. The colour combination was Midnight black with Cool Champagne for the roof.

=== Specifications ===
Four-cylinder engine, automatic transmission and manual transmission options are identical to those used in the corresponding hatchback models, except for the 66 kW (90 PS; 89 bhp) One Diesel which is not offered in the Clubman. The rear suspension setup shares many of the same design features, including the rear trailing arms and the anti-roll bars.

In 2011 the Peugeot DV6 (Ford DLD-416) engine used in the diesel models was replaced with 1.6L BMW N47 engines. The 2.0L version of the BMW engine appeared for the first time in the range for the Cooper SD versions.

The Clubman comes with 6 airbags, stability control, brake assist and electronic brakeforce distribution.

=== Cargo area ===
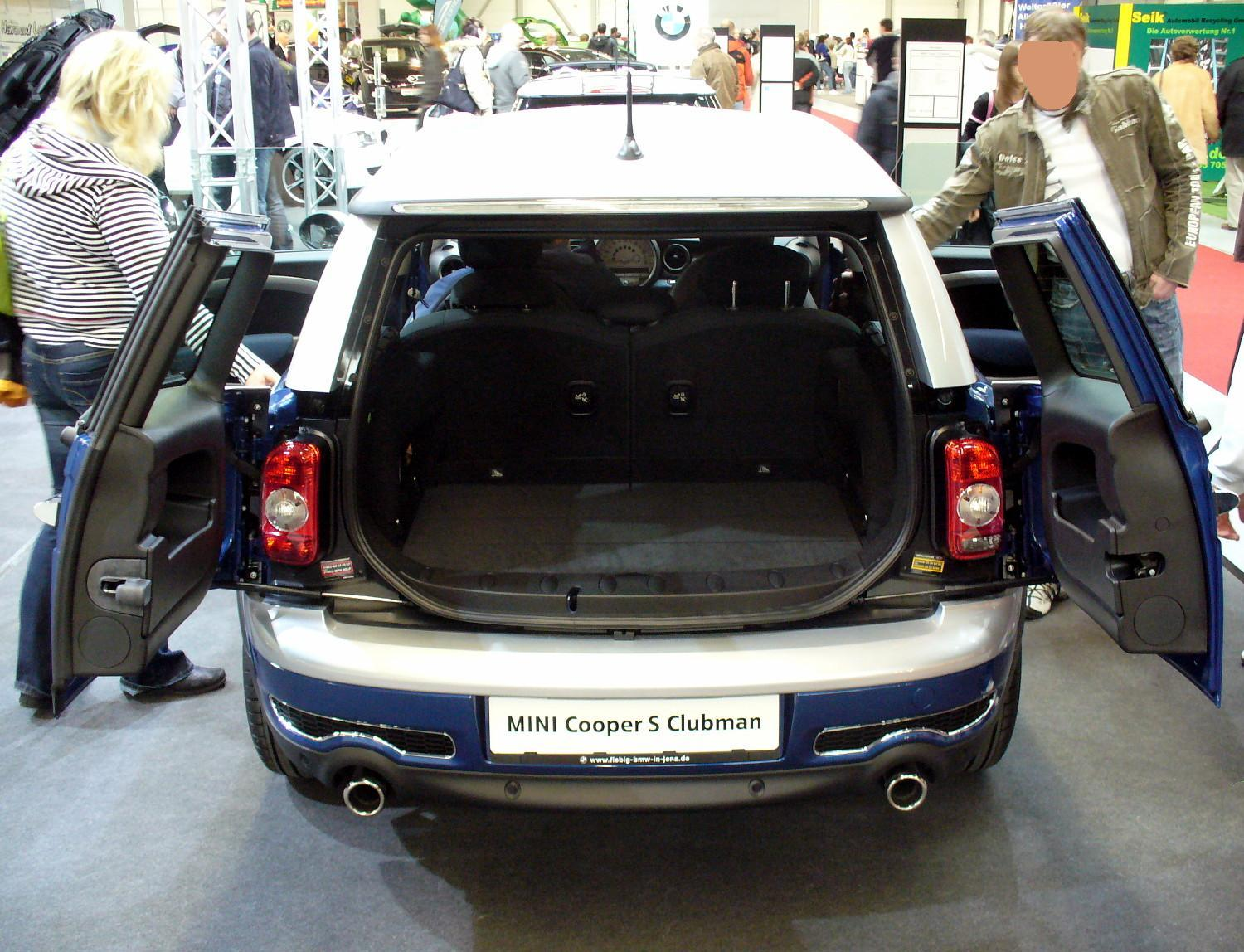
Clubman's cargo area

The cargo area of the first generation Clubman received mixed reviews. Although it was far bigger than the Mini Hatch, most critics still believed that it was too small in comparison to one of its main competitors, the Volkswagen Jetta SportWagen. Many complaints were also cited about the boot/trunk. The car area aft of the B pillar was said to suffer high levels of road noise, especially at high speeds. Also, the rear seats did not fold flat with the load floor. Critics also said that the "storage package", which included options such as a 12V power outlet, perimeter lighting, and nets, should have been a standard fitting on the vehicle.

=== Clubvan ===
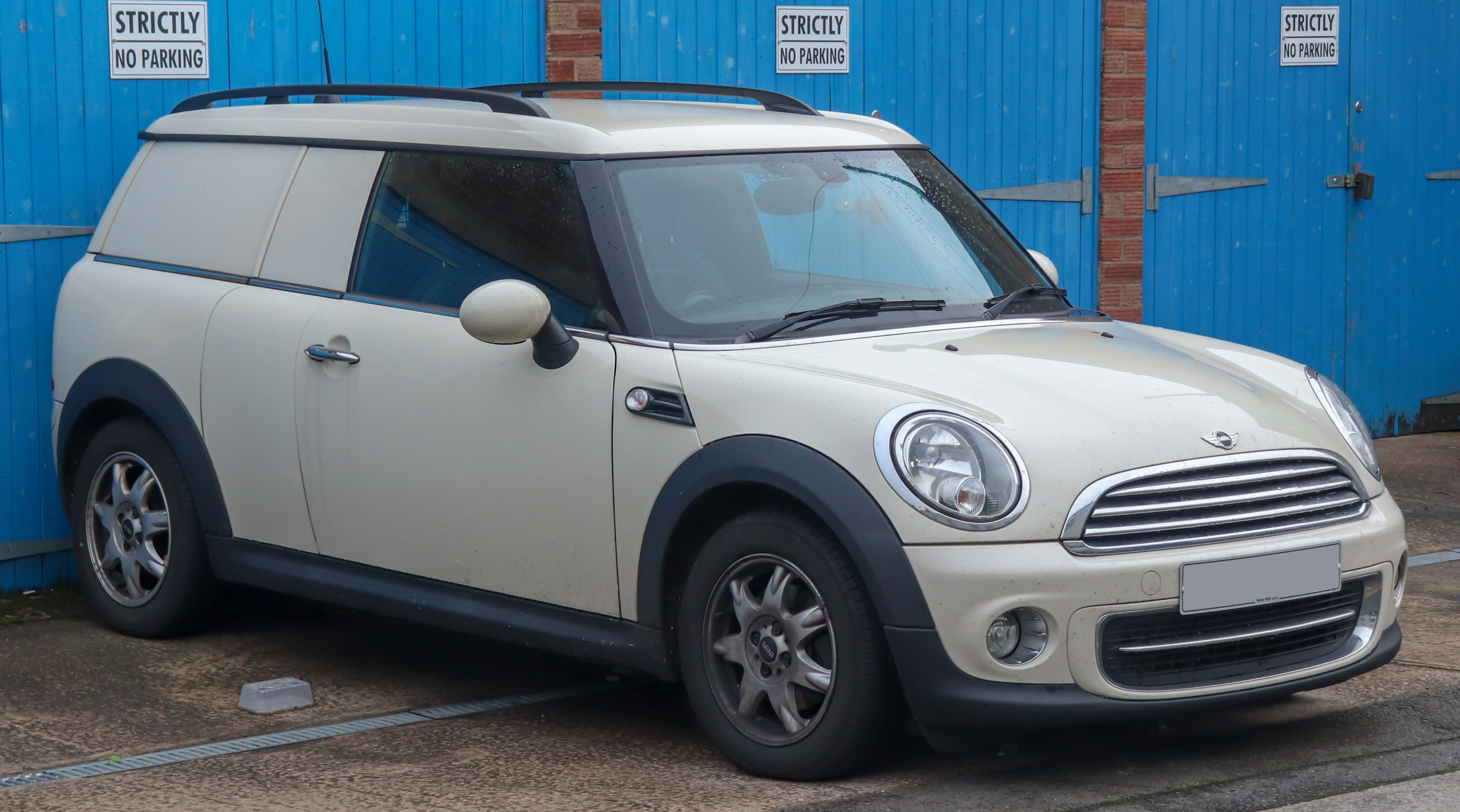
MINI Clubvan

The light commercial, panel van version of the Clubman was first shown to the public in June 2012, called the Clubvan. Initially shown as a concept car at the 2012 Geneva Motor Show, a pre-production version was shown at the Goodwood Festival of Speed. Sales in the US began in early calendar 2013 but it was withdrawn in July with only 50 units sold, the Chicken tax having made it more expensive than a Clubman passenger wagon.

== Second generation (2015) ==
Second generation
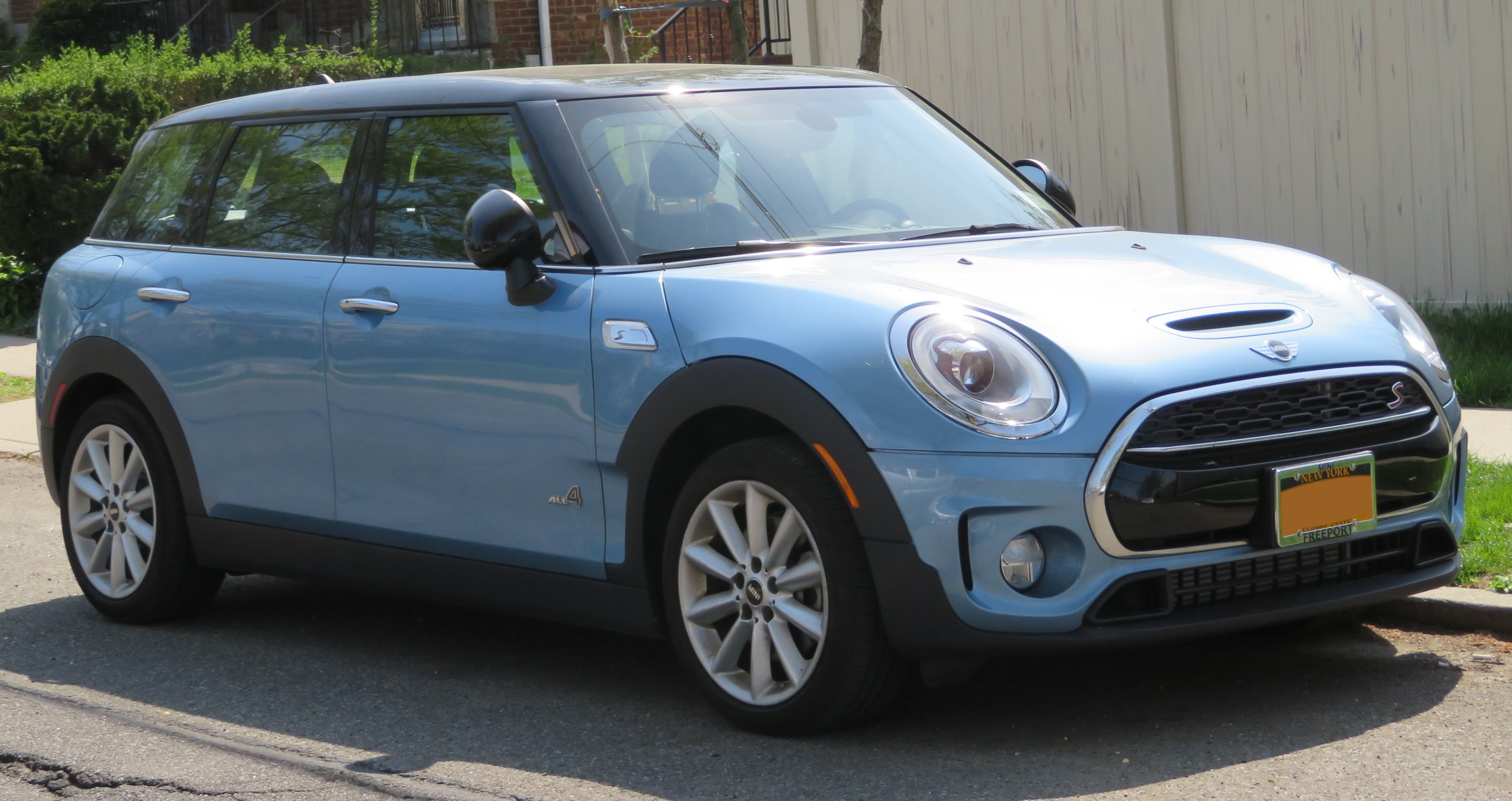

Overview
- Model code: F54
- Production: 2015–2024
- Assembly: United Kingdom: Cowley, Oxfordshire (Plant Oxford)
- Designer: Alexander Schneider

Body and chassis
- Body style: 6-door station wagon
- Layout: Front engine, front-wheel drive / four-wheel drive
- Platform: BMW UKL2 platform

Powertrain
- Engine: Petrol: 1.5 L B38 turbo I3 (Cooper); 2.0 L B48 turbo I4 (Cooper S, JCW); Diesel: 1.5 L B37 turbo I3 (One D); 2.0 L B47 turbo I4 (Cooper D/SD)
- Transmission: 6-speed automatic 8-speed Aisin AWF8F35 automatic 6-speed manual 7-speed Getrag 7DCT300 dual clutch

Dimensions
- Wheelbase: 2,670 mm (105.1 in)
- Length: 4,275 mm (168.3 in)
- Width: 1,801 mm (70.9 in)
- Height: 1,440 mm (56.7 in)
- Kerb weight: 1,375 kg (3,031 lb)

A second generation Clubman was announced in 2013, with model code F54. A concept version was unveiled at the 2014 Geneva Motor Show, with the production model debuting at the 2015 Frankfurt IAA Motor Show.

The new model, based on the BMW UKL2 platform, features more space. At the time of its debut, the Mini Clubman was the largest Mini ever manufactured by the brand, measuring 427 centimetres (168.3 in) long and it is wider measuring 180 centimetres (70.9 in). It abandons the previous model's asymmetrical door layout for a standard four-door design, but it retains the rear barn doors.

Mini used many soft-touch plastics to cover the dash and majority of the door panels, real leather upholstery, and several upscale trim options.

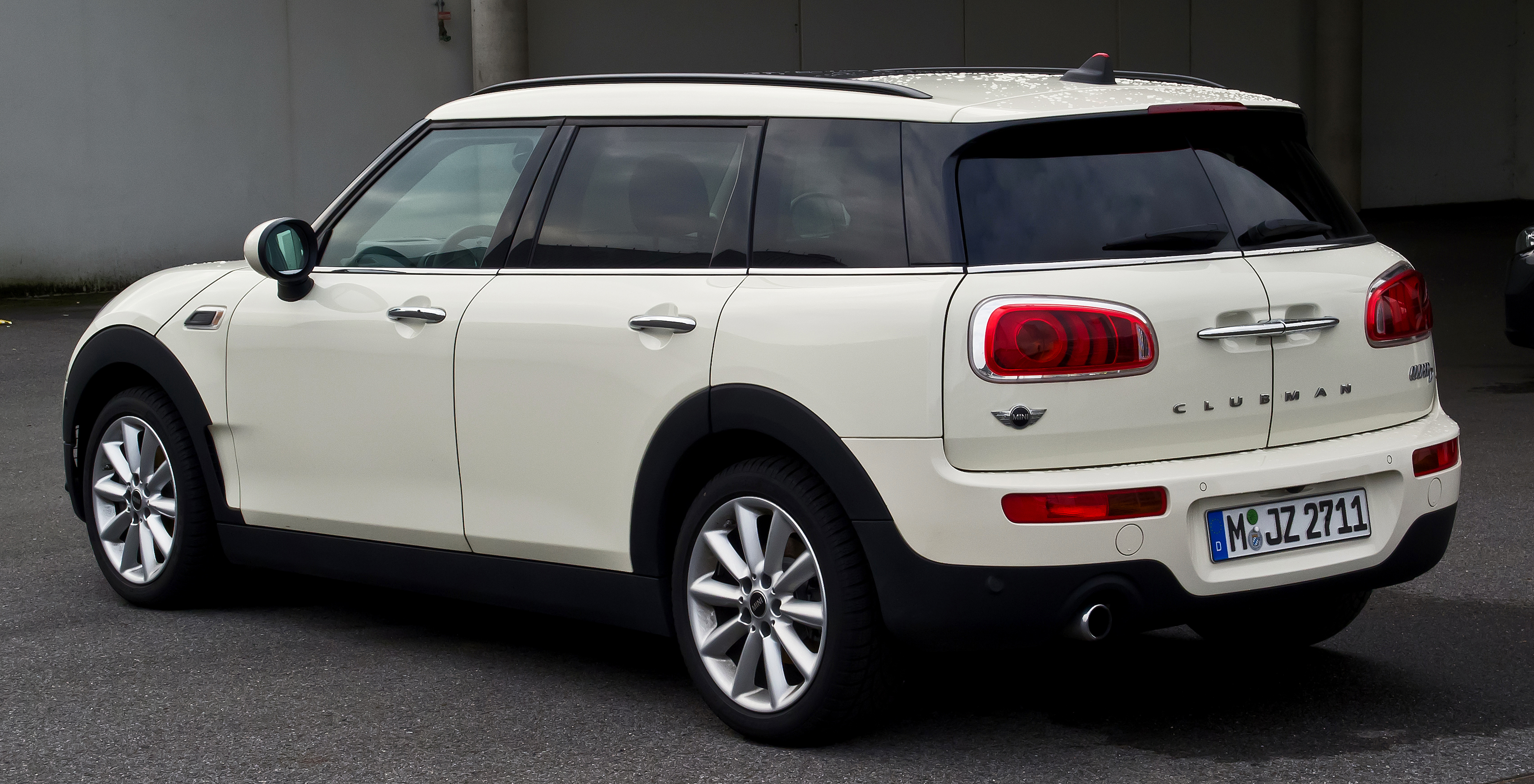
Mini Cooper Clubman

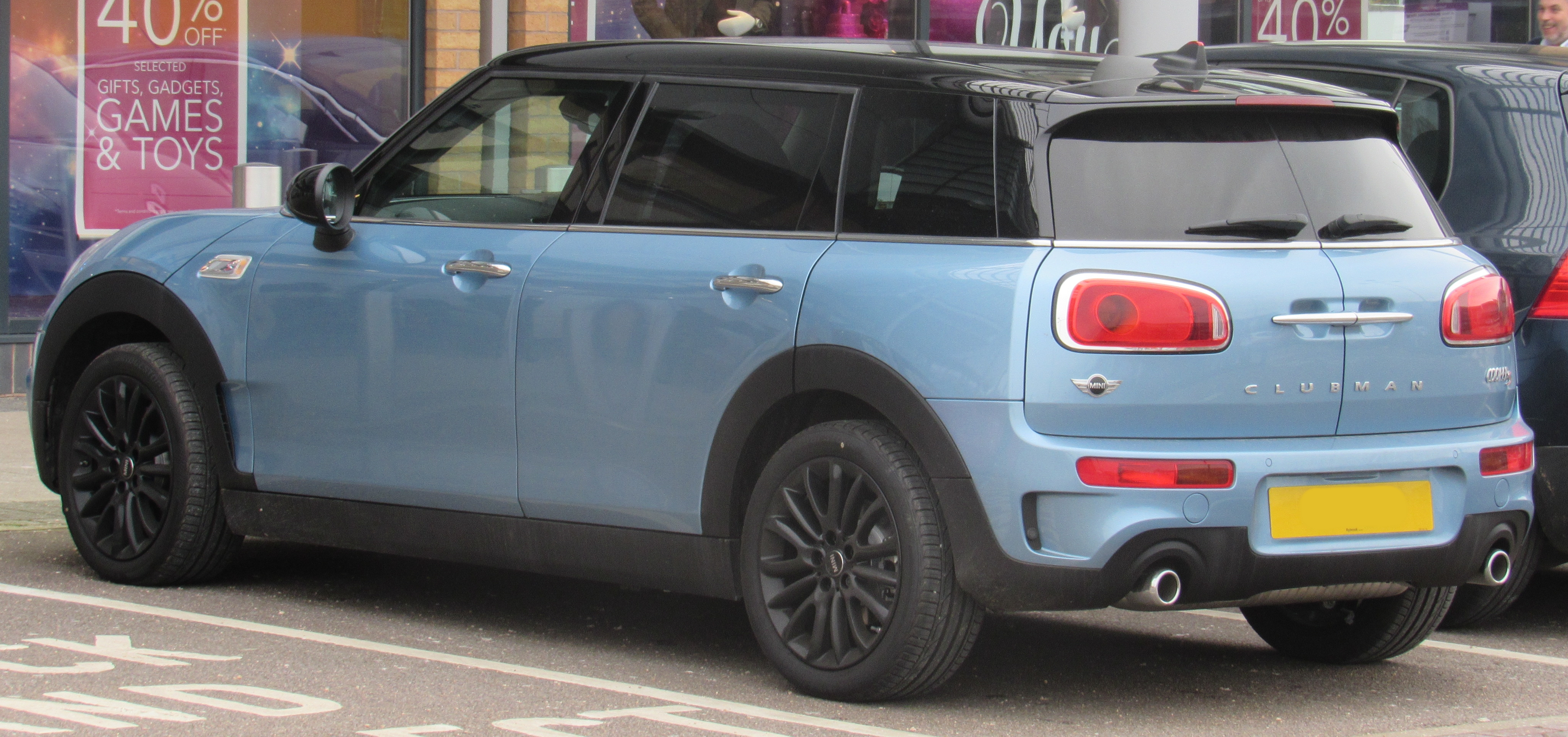
Mini Cooper Clubman S

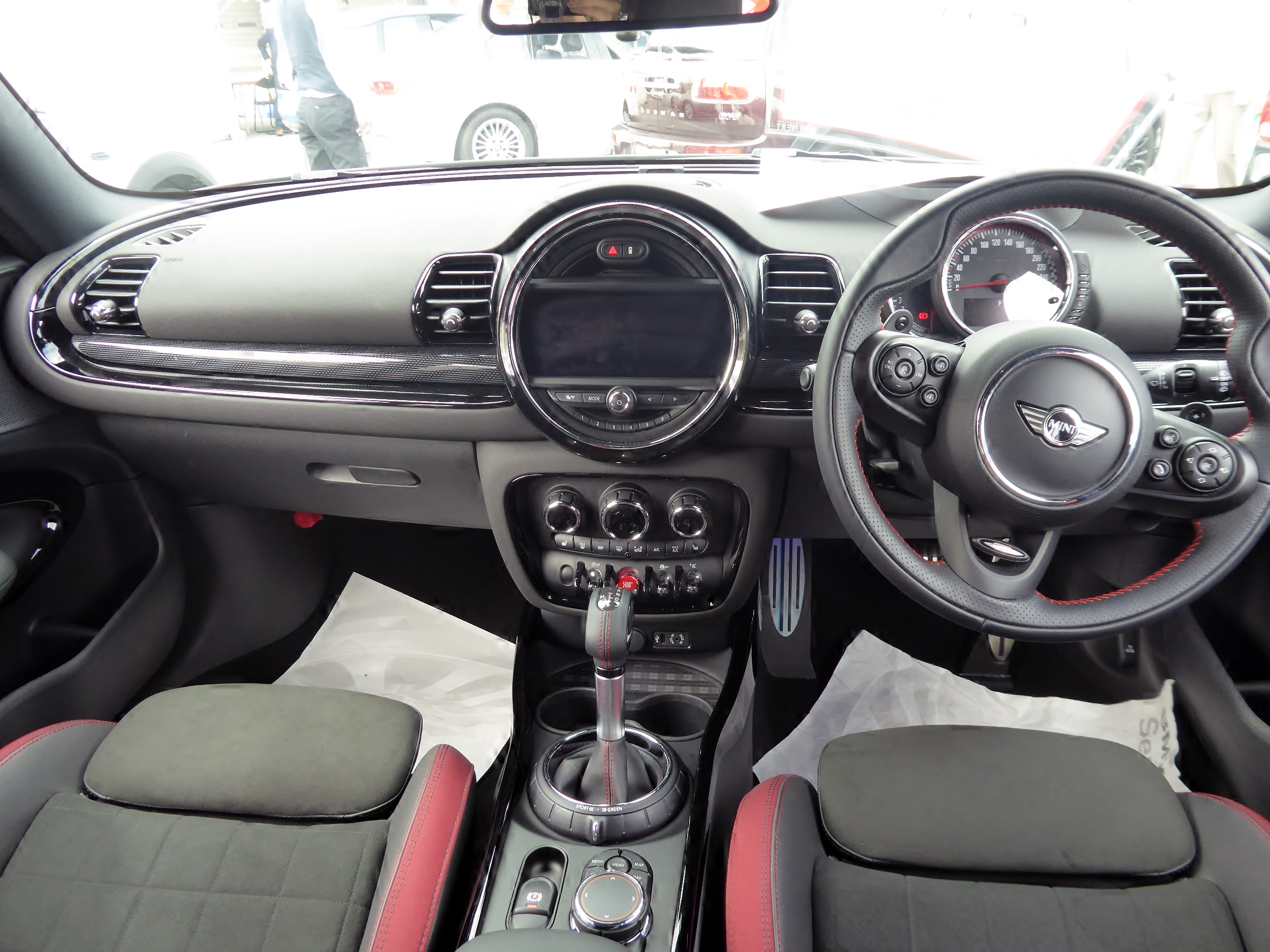
Clubman JCW interior

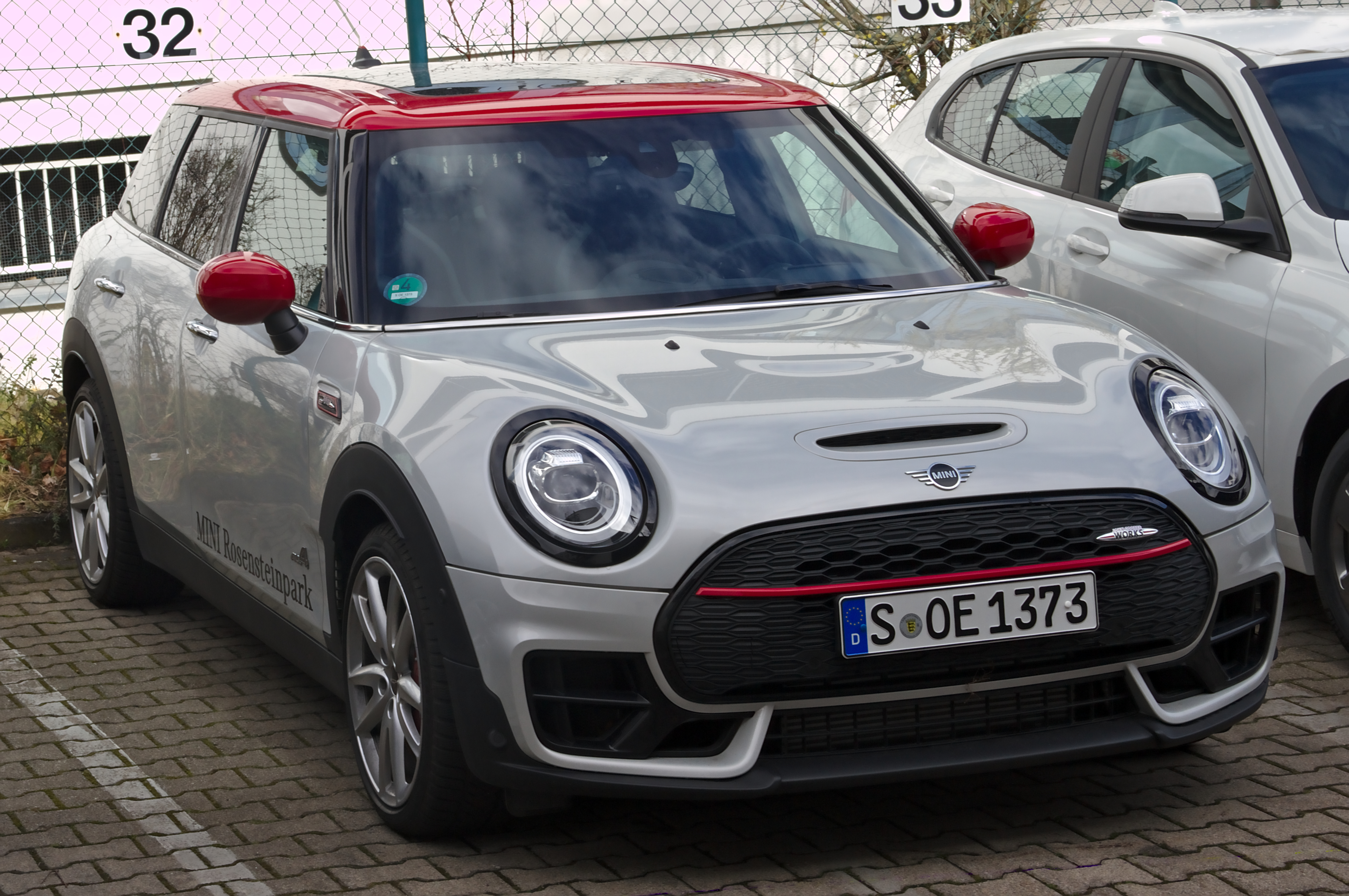
Mini Clubman JCW

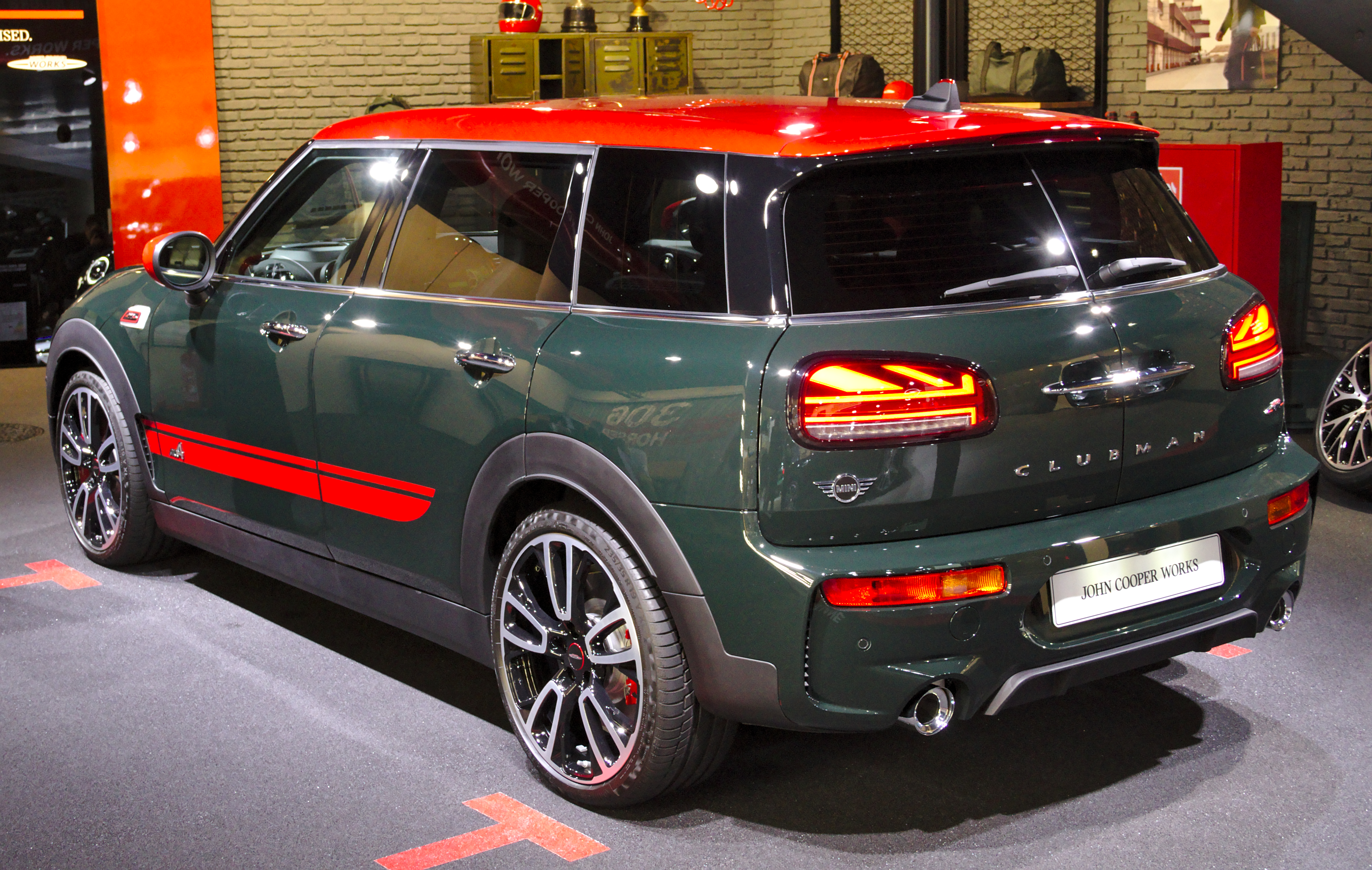
Clubman 2019 life-cycle impulse rear

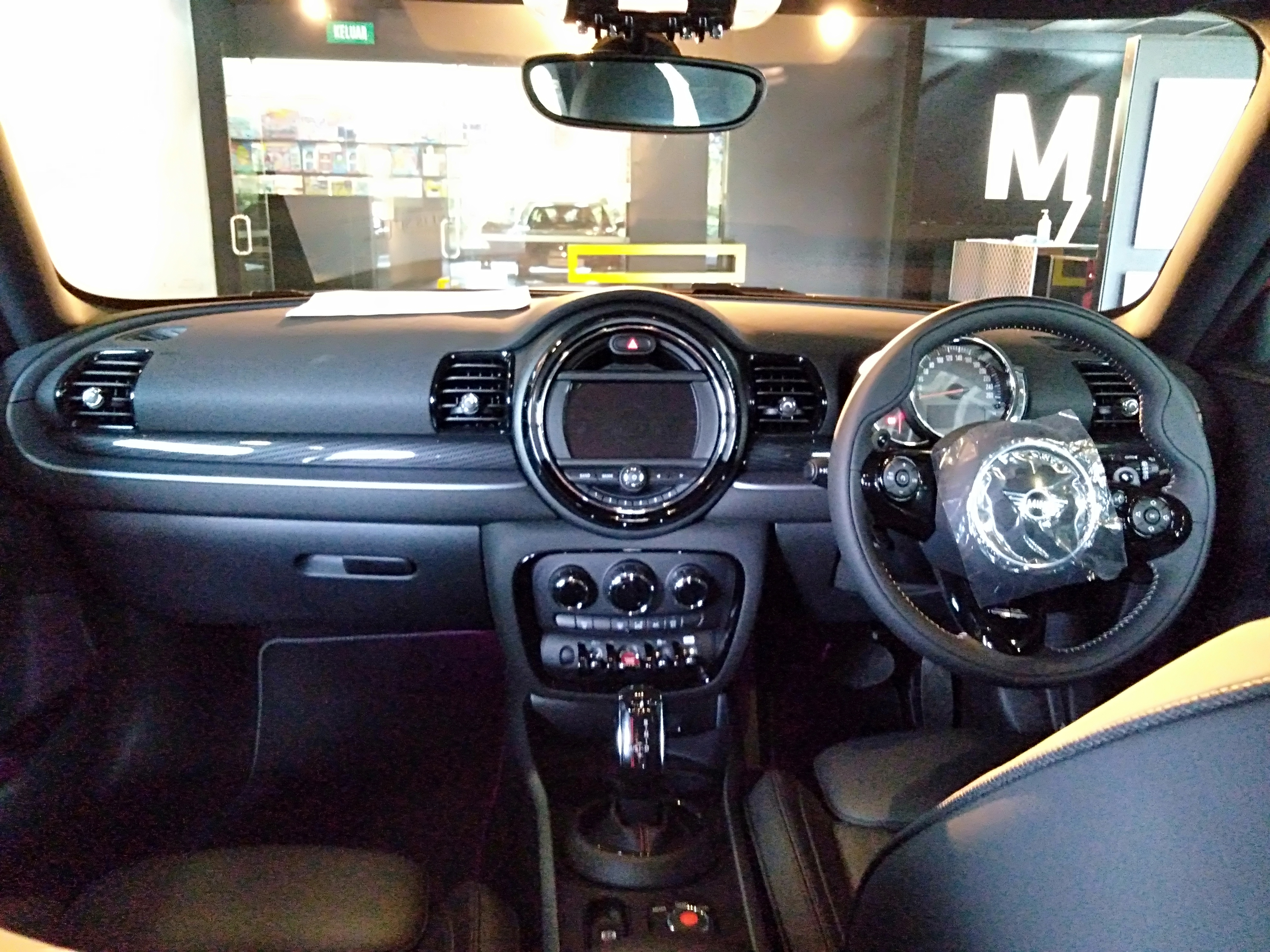
Interior (life-cycle impulse update)

=== Engines ===
This generation of the Mini Clubman comes with two engines for the North American market. The basic model comes with the 100 kW (134 bhp) 1.5 liter 3-cylinder engine mated with either a 6-spd manual or 6-spd automatic transmission, while the new Mini Cooper S Clubman comes with a 2.0 liter 4-cylinder engine and 189 bhp, mated with either a 6-spd manual or 8-spd automatic transmission.

Model	Fuel type	Displacement	Cylinders	Transmission	Power	Torque	Emissions CO_{2}	Top speed	Acceleration 0–62 mph (0–100 km/h)	Kerb weight
One	Petrol	1.5 L (1,499 cc)	3	6-speed manual [6-speed auto] from 2018–present: 6-speed manual, [7-speed DCT] JCW: [8-speed auto]	75 kW/102 PS	190 N⋅m (140 lb⋅ft)	111-109 [114-112] g/km	195 km/h (121 mph)	9.9 [10.2] s	1165 [1195] kg
Cooper	Petrol	1.5 L (1,499 cc)	3	6-speed manual [6-speed auto] from 2018–present: 6-speed manual, [7-speed DCT] JCW: [8-speed auto]	100 kW/136 PS	220 N⋅m (162 lb⋅ft)	107-105 [112-109] g/km	210 km/h (130 mph)	7.9 [7.8] s	1160 [1190] kg
Cooper S	Petrol	2.0 L (1,998 cc)	4	6-speed manual [6-speed auto] from 2018–present: 6-speed manual, [7-speed DCT] JCW: [8-speed auto]	141 kW/192 PS	280 N⋅m (207 lb⋅ft)	136-133 [126-123] g/km	235 km/h (146 mph) [233 km/h (145 mph)]	6.8 [6.7] s	1235 [1250] kg
John Cooper Works	Petrol	2.0 L (1,998 cc)	4	6-speed manual [6-speed auto] from 2018–present: 6-speed manual, [7-speed DCT] JCW: [8-speed auto]	170 kW/231 PS (from 8/2019 225kW/306 PS)	320 N⋅m (236 lb⋅ft) (from 8/2019 450N⋅m)	147 [133] g/km (from 8/2019 [169] g/km)	246 km/h (153 mph) (from 8/2019 250 km/h = 155 mph)	6.3 [6.1] s (from 8/2019 [4.9] s)	1205 [1220] kg
One D	Diesel	1.5 L (1,496 cc)	3	6-speed manual [6-speed auto] From 2018–present: 6-speed manual [7-speed DCT]	85 kW/116 PS	270 N⋅m (162 lb⋅ft)	92-89 g/km	190 km/h (118 mph)	11.6 s	1190 kg
Cooper D	Diesel	2.0 L (1,995 cc)	4	6-speed manual [8-speed torque converter auto]	110 kW/150 PS	330 N⋅m (199 lb⋅ft)	115-109 [115-109] g/km	212 km/h (132 mph) [212 km/h (132 mph)]	8.6 [8.5] s	1395 [1435] kg
Cooper SD	Diesel	2.0 L (1,995 cc)	4	6-speed manual [8-speed torque converter auto]	140 kW/190 PS	400 N⋅m (266 lb⋅ft)	122-119 [117-114] g/km	225 km/h (140 mph) [225 km/h (140 mph)]	7.4 [7.4] s	1460 [1480] kg

=== Clubman ALL4 ===
This generation of the Clubman is the first to receive Mini's all wheel drive system, known as "ALL4". The system uses an electro-hydraulic system, which uses an electronically managed hydraulic pump to adjust the clutch sending power to the rear wheels. The system can then divert up to 50% of the engine’s power to the rear wheels, and the system actually defaults to AWD from the start, not FWD. Similar to BMW’s Xdrive system, which defaults to a 70/30 split rear to front and is able to divert 100% of power to the rear wheels, ALL4 starts at 50/50 and is able to re-allocate up to 100% of power back to the front wheels. Unlike one of its main competitors, the Volkswagen Golf Alltrack, the ALL4 version of the Clubman does not feature any raised suspension or rugged exterior design and body panels. Originally when it first arrived at dealerships, the Clubman was only available with ALL4 on the Cooper S model, but as of the 2017 model year, it is now available on the base Cooper model as well.

== Vision GT Concept ==
In 2014, work began on the MINI Clubman VGT, which was designed for the videogame Gran Turismo 6. The car features four-wheel drive and carbon fibre components to save weight, and at nearly 400 horsepower, is one of the most powerful Minis. It was made available to players via an update in February 2015.

== Discontinuation ==
The Final Edition was introduced in March 2023 and limited to 1,969 units globally, as a reference to the year the Clubman was originally introduced. The Final Edition was available in Nanuq White, Enigmatic Black and Melting Silver exterior colours, Shimmer Copper accents and stripes on the grille, hood, side and rear, a "1 of 1969 badge" on the C-Pillar and dual-tone wheels with copper elements. For the interior, there are "Final Edition" branded door sills, Dark Maroon leather sports seats, the same branding found on the steering wheel and dashboard, and special floor mats.

MINI scheduled to end Clubman production in February 2024, with no third generation model planned. In an interview with Top Gear, the head of MINI brand Stefanie Wurst explained that the future of the brand's model portfolio will not include the Clubman, since the Countryman outsells the Clubman 2 to 1 in worldwide sales.

On 5 February 2024, the final Clubman rolled off the production line at Plant Oxford after over 1.1 million units produced which includes the 550,000 figure from the BMW-era. A direct replacement is not planned for the Clubman because it had not been a commercial success for the BMW Group, as consumers preference for crossover SUVs.

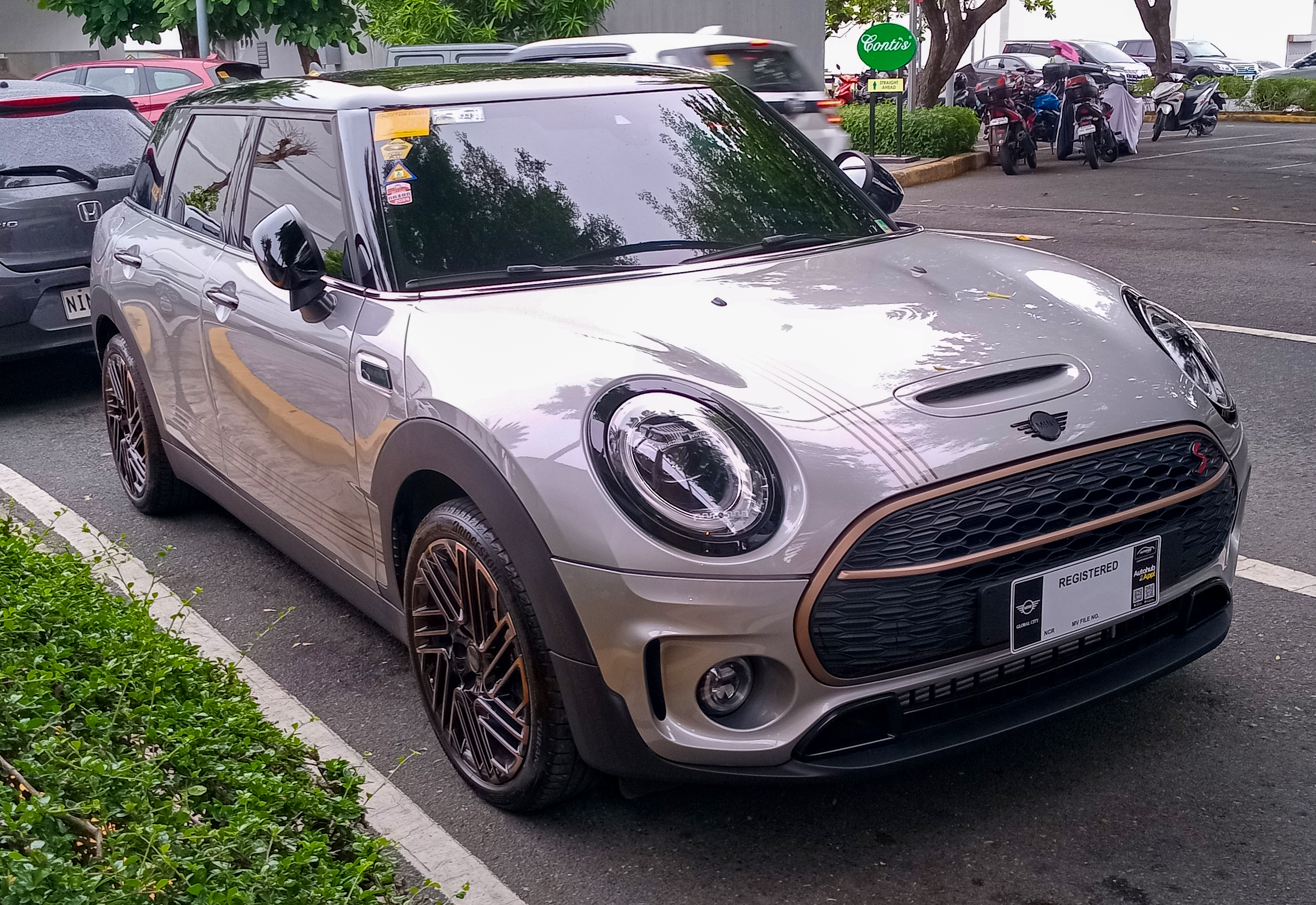
2024 Clubman Final Edition

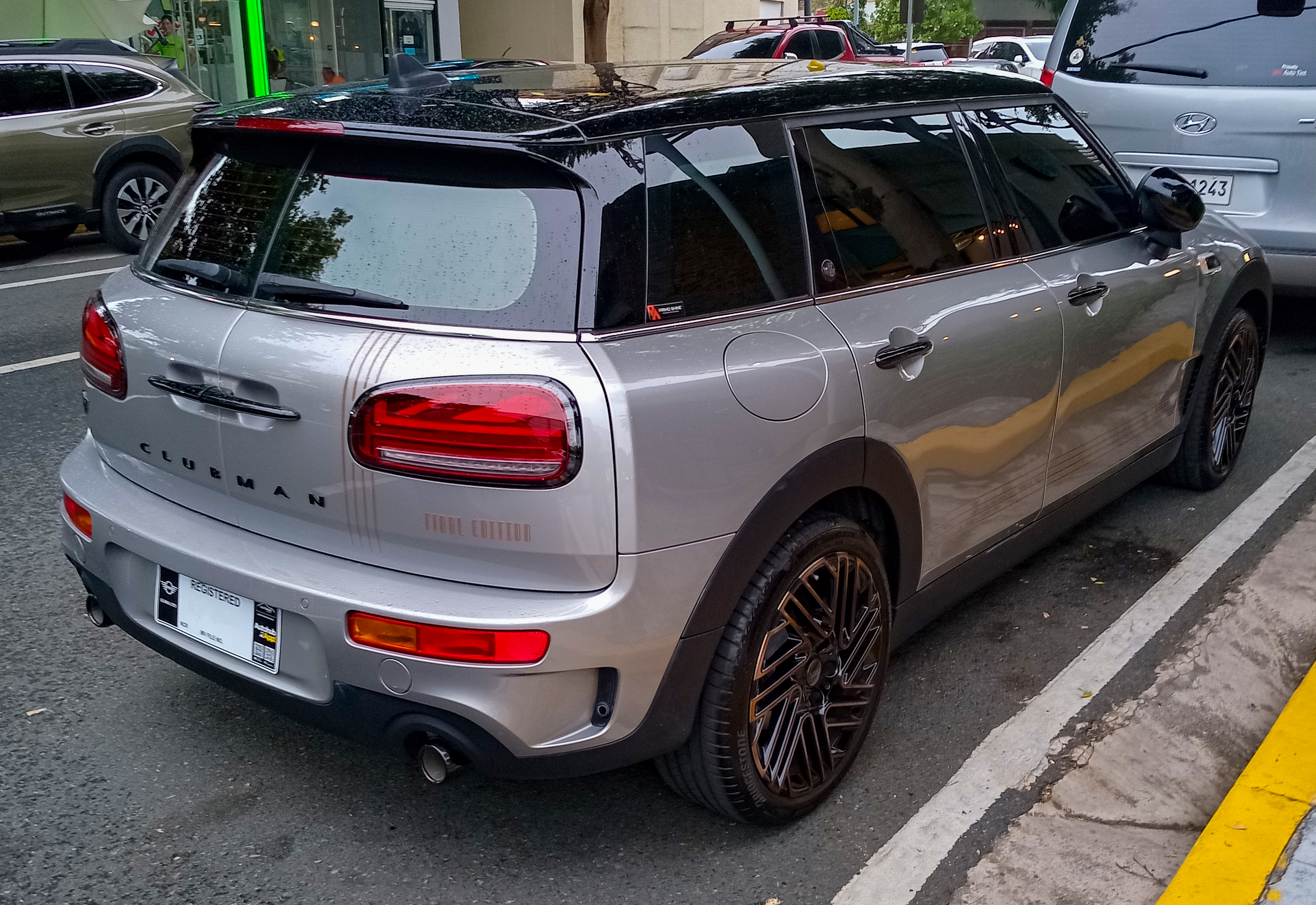
2024 Clubman Final Edition (rear view)

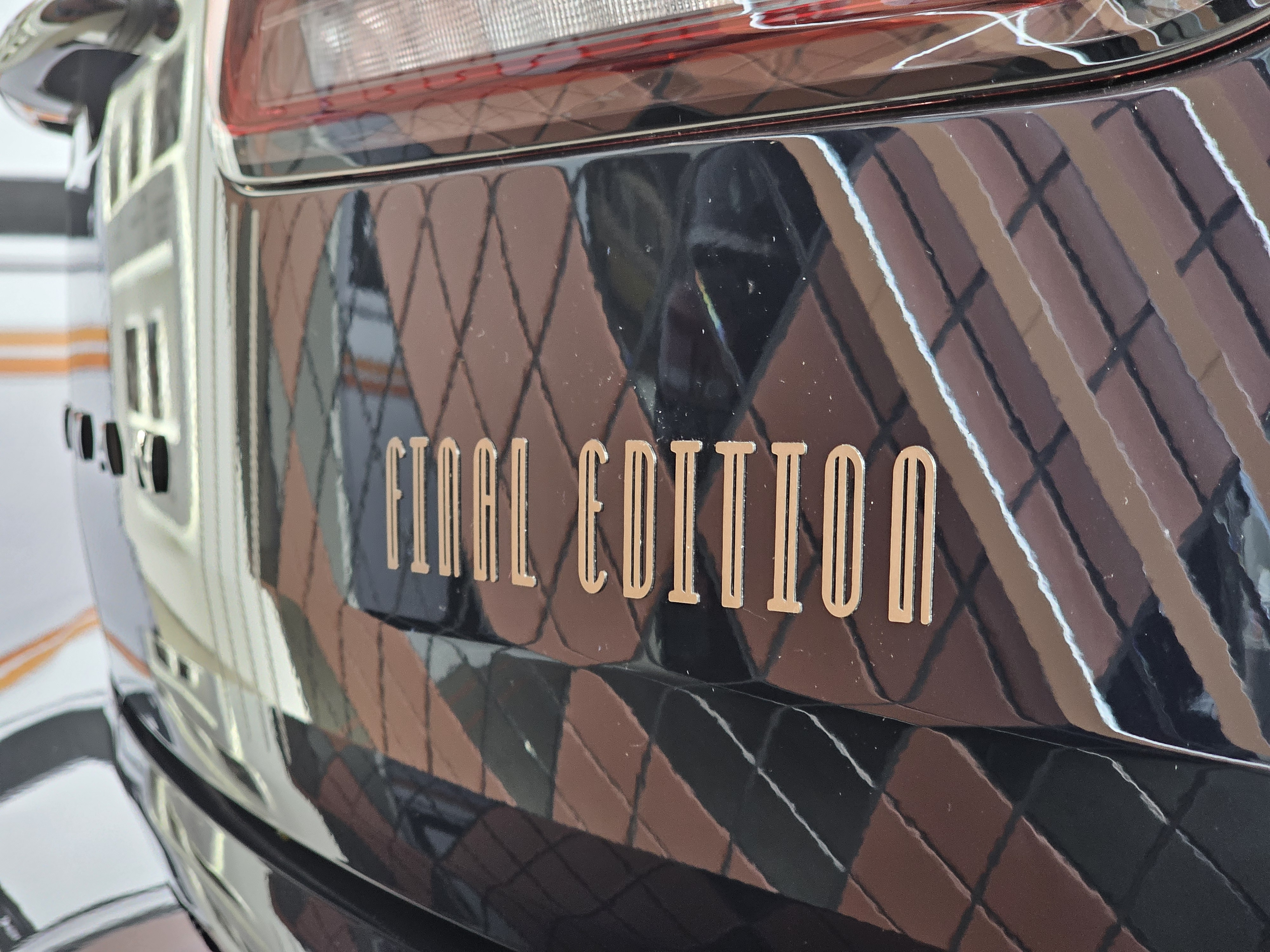
Final Edition logo
