= Karim Habib =

Lebanese automotive designer

- Born: March 17, 1970 (age 56); Beirut, Lebanon
- Citizenship: Lebanese, Canadian
- Education: McGill University
- Occupation: Automotive Designer
- Years active: 1998–present
- Known for: Automotive Design

Karim Antoine Habib (born 1970) is a Lebanese automotive designer. He is currently the executive vice president and head of Kia global design for the Korean vehicle manufacturer Kia. He previously worked for BMW and Infiniti. He is fluent in Arabic, English, French, German, and Italian.

== Career ==
Born in Lebanon, Habib had to leave the country due to the ensueing civil war and moved to Canada in his teenage years, and was educated at McGill University, as well as Transportation Design at the Art Center College of Design.

In 1998, he was hired by BMW. He got his first break at BMW designing the interior of the E60 5 Series. Later he designed the exterior of the BMW 7 Series F01. He left to work for Mercedes-Benz in 2009 for a few years and came back to BMW in 2011 as exterior designer until January 2017.

He started employment with Infiniti in July 2017 and left the company in August 2019, being replaced by Taisuke Nakamura.

In September 2019, Habib joined Kia as Senior Vice President and Head of Kia Design Center.

== Notable works ==
- Mercedes-Benz F800
- BMW CS Concept
- BMW 7 Series (F01)
- BMW 7 Series (G11)
- BMW X6
- BMW X3
- BMW 5 Series (E60) (interior)
- Infiniti Q Inspiration concept
- Kia Optima/K5 (DL3)
- Kia Sorento (MQ4)
- Kia Carnival (KA4)
- Kia Sonet (QY)
- Kia EV6 (CV)
- Kia K8 (GL3)
- Kia Carens (KY)
- Kia EV9 (MV)
- Kia K4 (CL4)
- Kia EV4 (CT)
- Kia Seltos (SP3)
