= Kia EV9 =

Battery electric mid-size crossover SUV

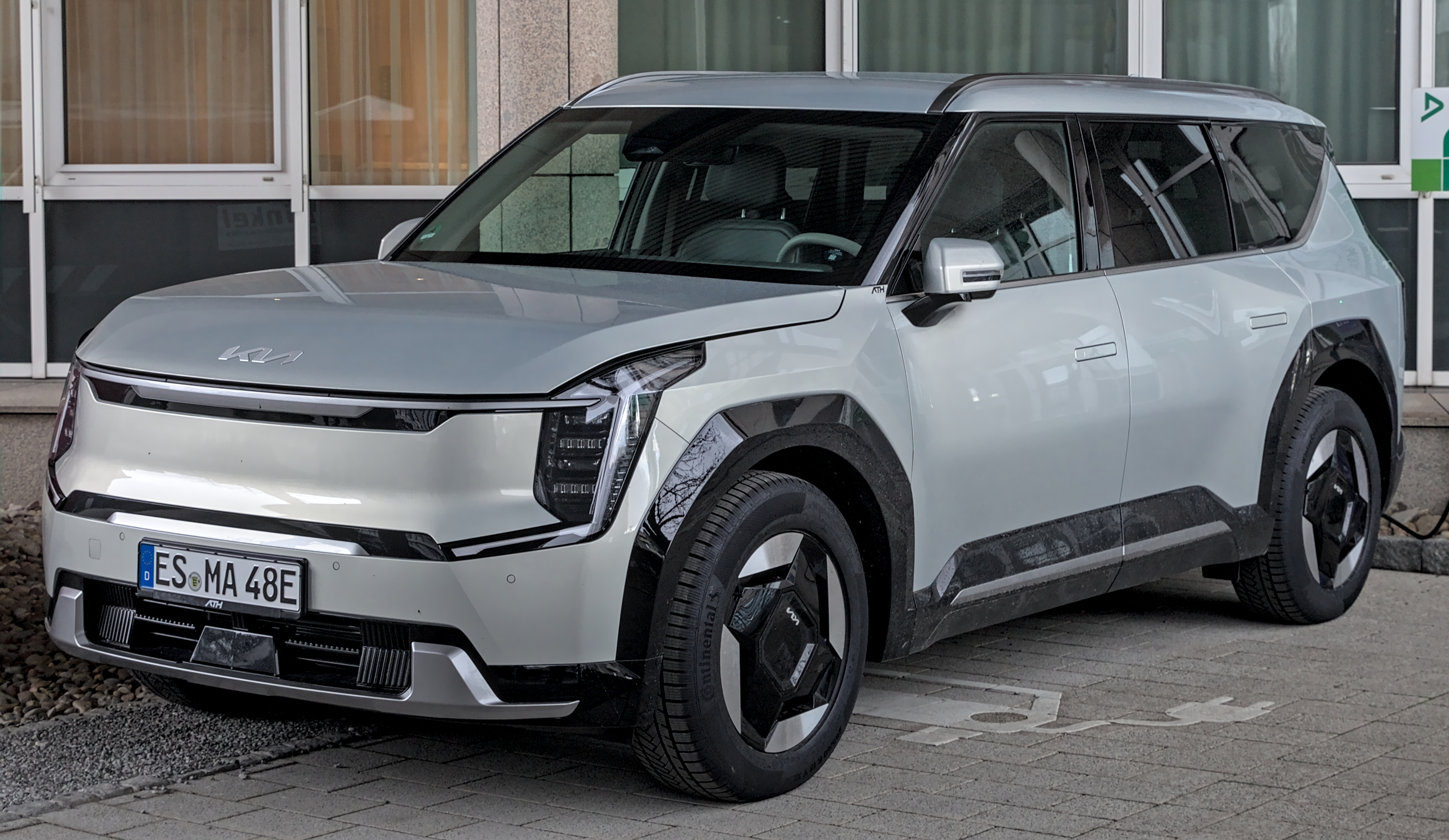

Overview
- Manufacturer: Kia
- Model code: MV
- Production: 2023–present
- Model years: 2024–present (North America)
- Assembly: South Korea: Gwangmyeong; United States: West Point, Georgia (KMMG)
- Designer: Karim Habib (design chief)

Body and chassis
- Class: Mid-size crossover SUV (E)
- Body style: 5-door SUV
- Layout: Rear-motor, rear-wheel-drive; Dual-motor, all-wheel-drive
- Platform: E-GMP
- Related: Hyundai Ioniq 5; Hyundai Ioniq 6; Hyundai Ioniq 9; Kia EV6; Genesis GV60

Powertrain
- Battery: 76.1 kWh lithium-ion (Standard); 99.8 kWh lithium-ion (Long Range)
- Range: Up to 541 km (336 mi) (WLTP)
- Plug-in charging: 240 kW, 800 V DC; 11 kW AC; V2L: 3.68 kW

Dimensions
- Wheelbase: 3,100 mm (122.0 in)
- Length: 5,010–5,015 mm (197.2–197.4 in)
- Width: 1,980 mm (78.0 in)
- Height: 1,755–1,780 mm (69.1–70.1 in)
- Curb weight: 2,405–2,664 kg (5,302–5,873 lb)

The Kia EV9 (Korean: 기아 EV9) is a battery electric mid-size crossover SUV with three-row seating produced by Kia since 2023.

It is the second Kia model developed on the Electric Global Modular Platform (E-GMP) and the second model in the manufacturer's "EV" electric car range after the EV6.

It is the largest Kia electric SUV in the line-up, acting as a battery electric alternative to the Telluride.

== Overview ==
=== Concept ===
The EV9 was first unveiled as the Kia EV9 Concept at the 2021 Los Angeles Auto Show, featuring three rows of seats. The concept car features an interior that can transform into a meeting room. The Kia EV9 offers two battery options: a 76 kWh battery or a 100 kWh battery. The real-world range is estimated to be around 400 km (250 mi) for the smaller battery and 500 km (310 mi) for the larger battery.

=== Production ===
Kia unveiled the silhouette of the production EV9 via an internet teaser on 3 March 2023. The EV9 was officially presented on 14 March 2023, featuring a similar design to the concept and the second-row seats which rotate 180 degrees.

The EV9 features the brand's 'Opposites United' design philosophy with a 'Digital Tiger Face' front fascia, vertical headlights and taillights. Kia said the EV9 was "formed from a polygonal design language" with the side having triangular fender structures and geometric wheel arches. Unlike the concept car, the production version features conventional opening rear doors as opposed to the suicide doorss.

The EV9 is the first Kia to debut with the Connected Car Navigation Cockpit (CCNC) with a Triple Panorama Display which houses the 12.3-inch digital instrument cluster, a 5-inch HVAC touchscreen controls, and a 12-inch touchscreen infotainment system.

Other available features include Digital Exterior Side View Mirrors, which use side cameras (in place of conventional door mirrors) and side interior displays on the front doors, Dual-Colour Ambient Lighting, Ergo Motion Seat massage function, a Meridian 14-speaker premium sound system, Remote Smart Parking Assist 2 and a Relaxation Seat mode for the first and second-row seats.

The EV9 is available in 6- and 7-seater configurations. Like the concept car, the production version has the option of second-row captain seats which can rotate 180 degrees to face the third row occupants and can rotate 90 degrees outward to the rear doors. The EV9 has a maximum boot space of 2,992 L (105.7 cu ft) when both the second and third-row seats are folded and a frunk storage compartment of 90 L (3.2 cu ft).

The EV9 supports up to 210 kW ultra-fast charging that is compatible with both 400V and 800V infrastructures.

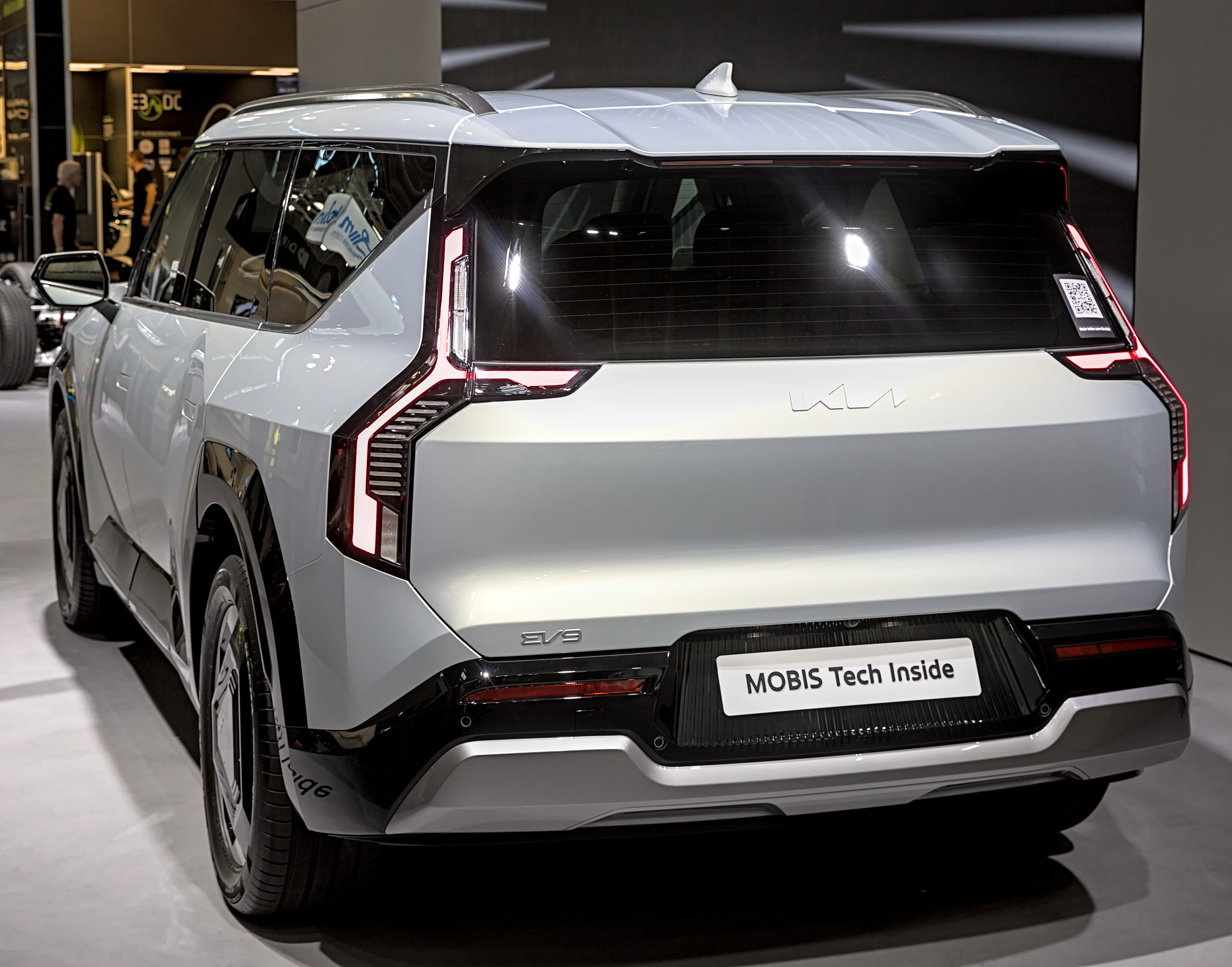
Rear view

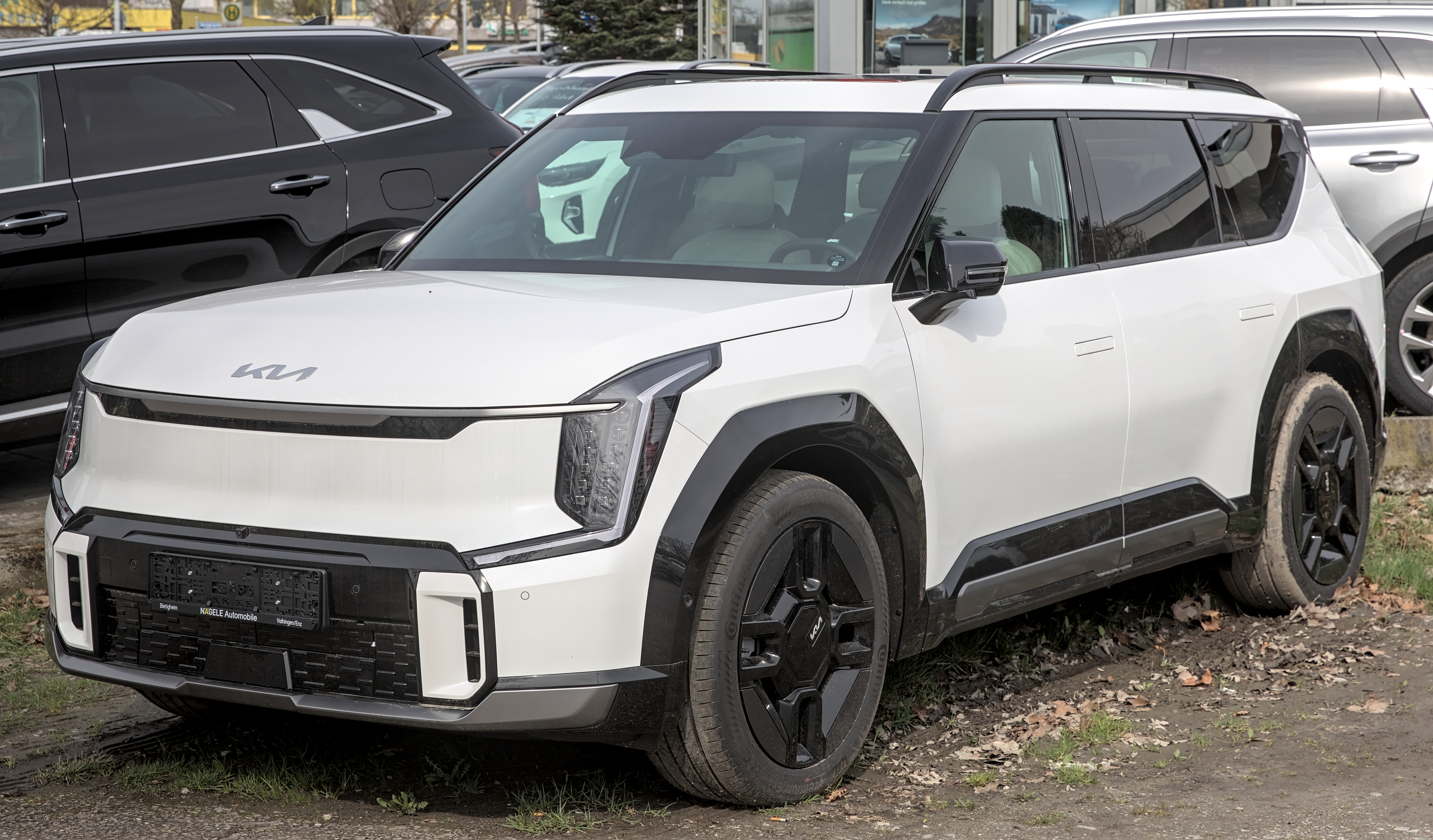
EV9 GT Line

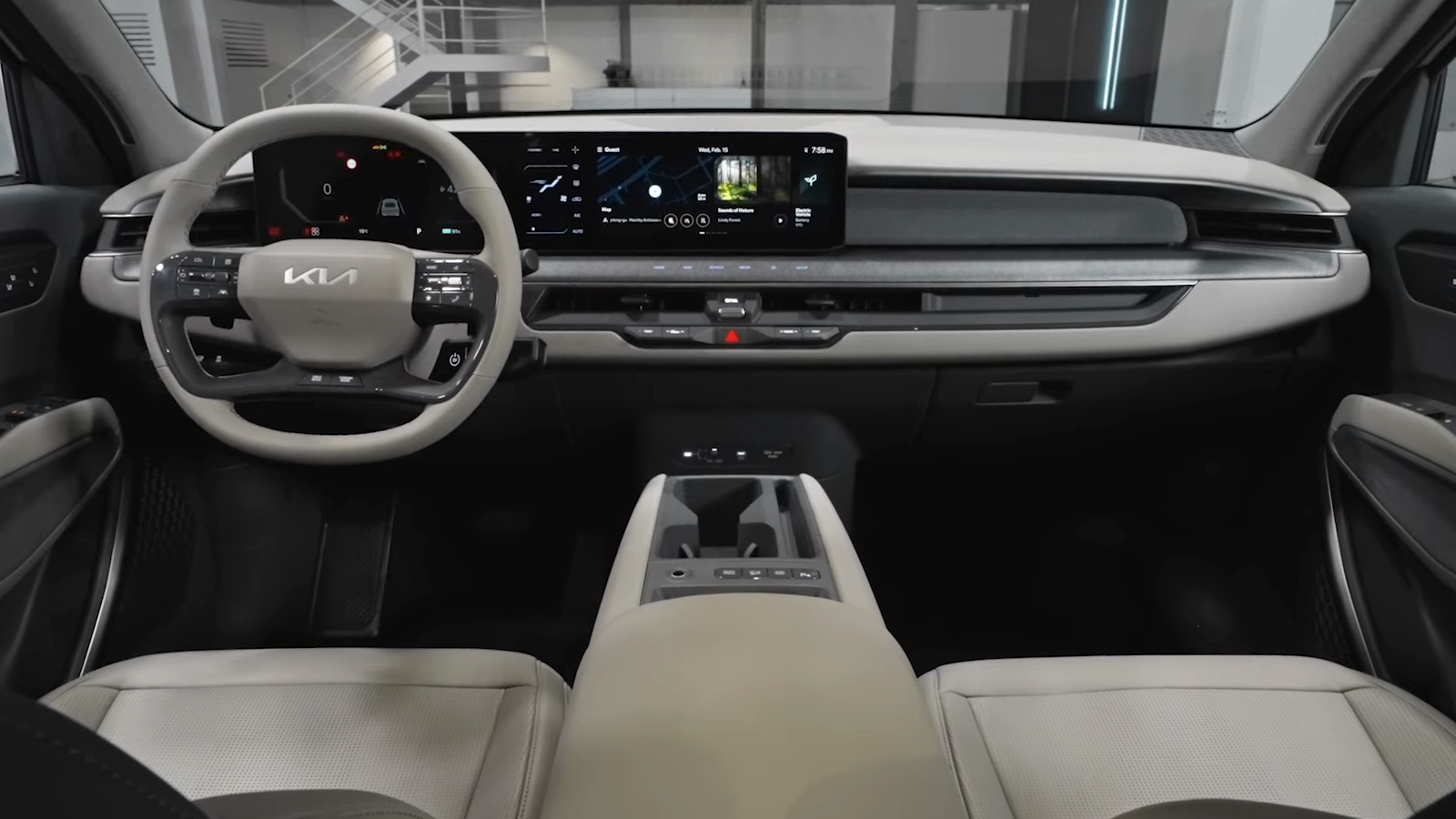
Interior

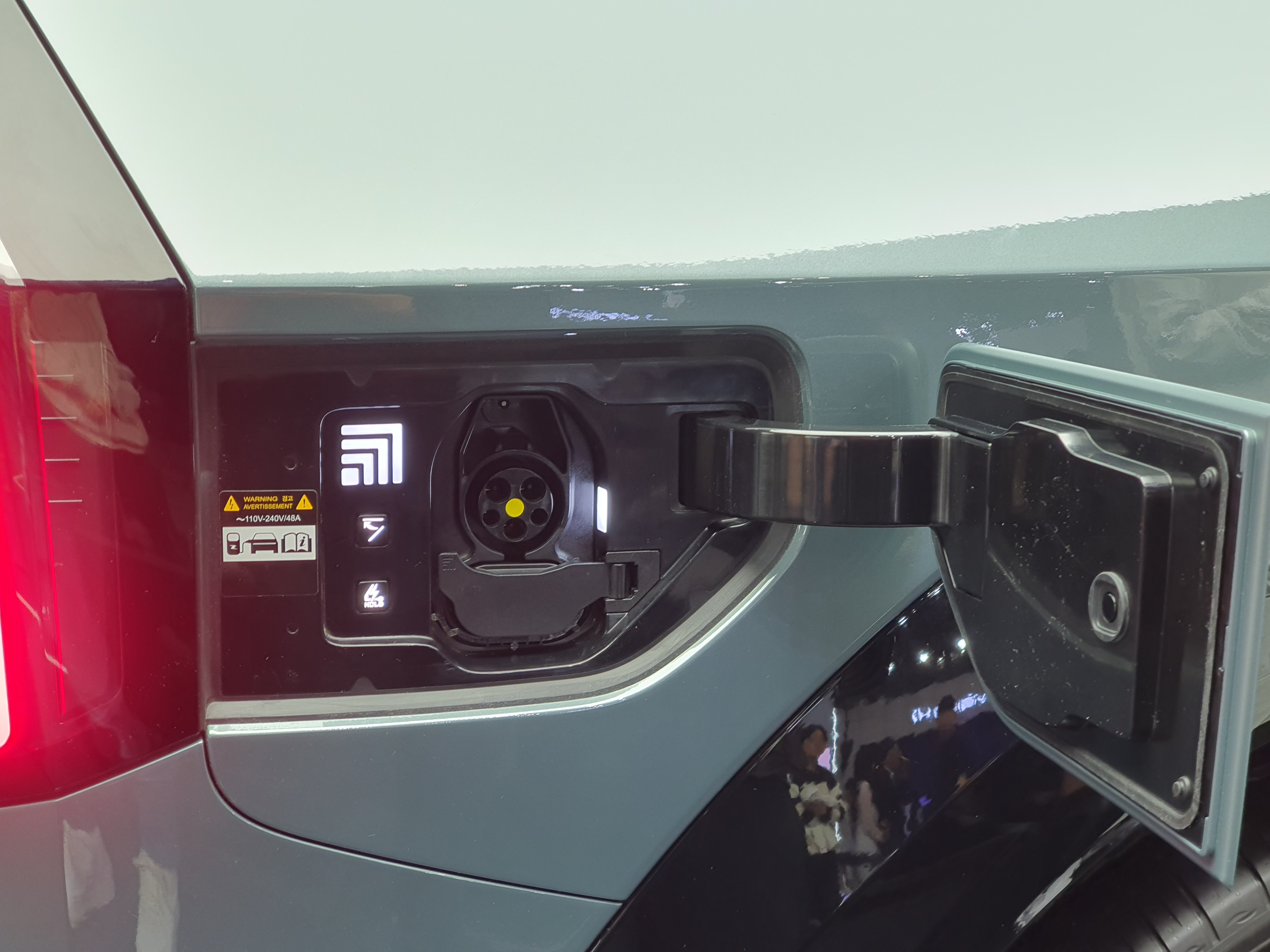
Charging Port

=== EV9 GT ===
The EV9 GT was released on 22 November 2024 as the high-performance version of the EV9.

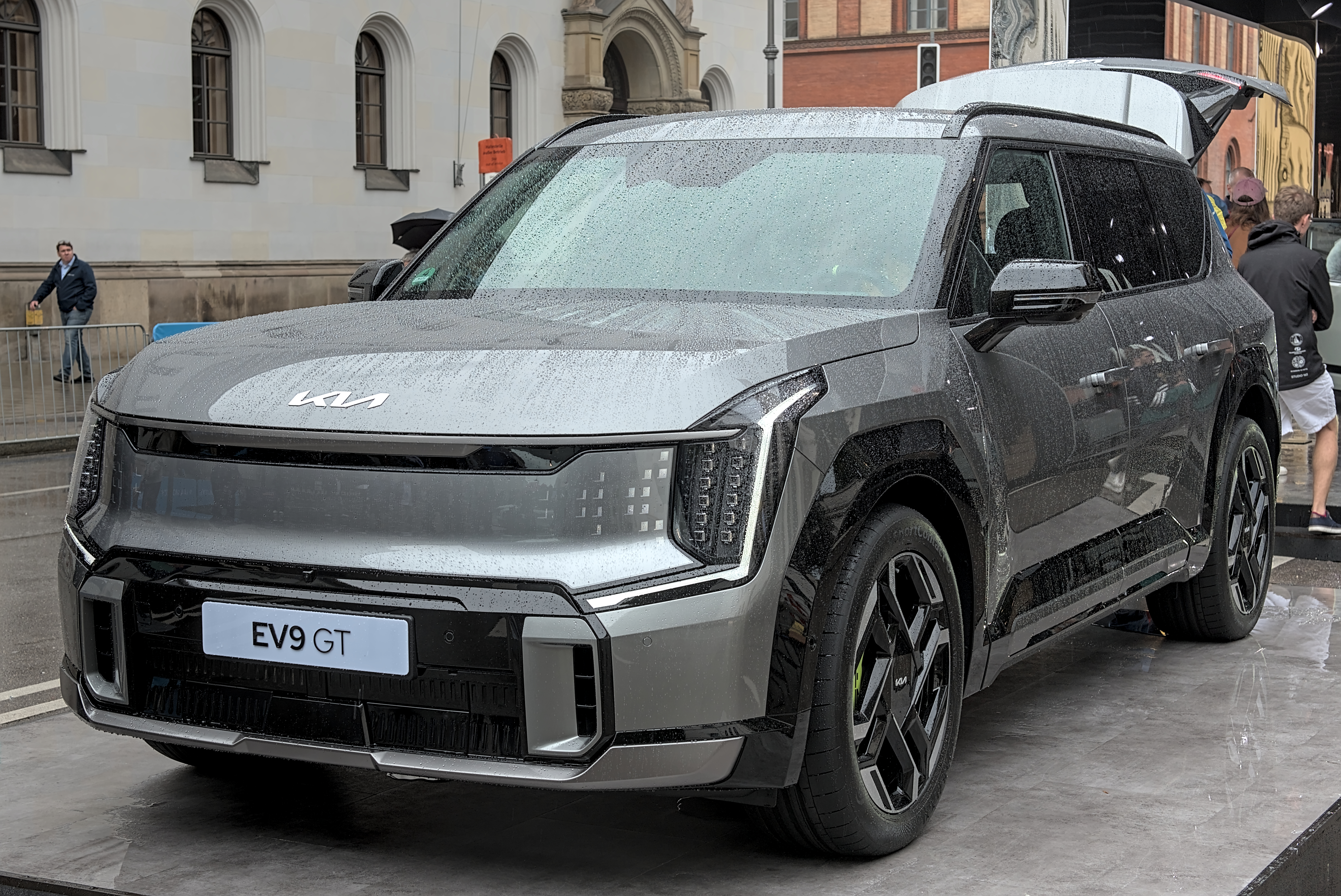
EV9 GT

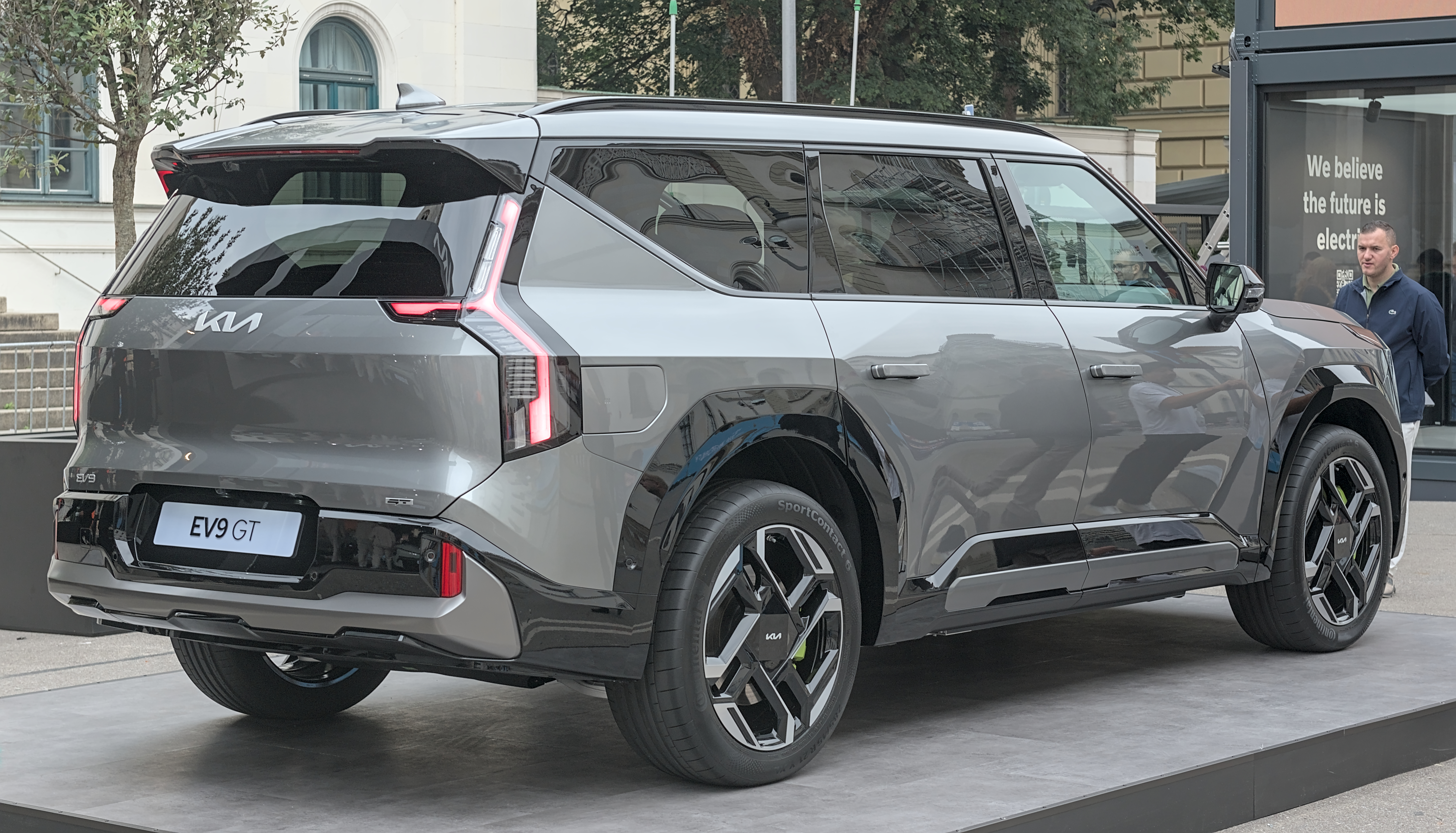
Rear view

==== Specifications ====
Powertrain
| Battery | Layout | Power | Torque | 0–100 km/h (0–62 mph) (official) | Top speed |
|---|---|---|---|---|---|
| 76.1 kWh (Standard Range) | RWD | 160 kW (218 PS; 215 hp) | 350 N⋅m (258 lbf⋅ft) | 8.2 s | 185 km/h (115 mph) |
| 99.8 kWh (Long Range) | RWD | 150 kW (204 PS; 201 hp) at 4,200–8,200 rpm | 350 N⋅m (258 lbf⋅ft) at 0–4,000 rpm | 9.4 s | 185 km/h (115 mph) |
| 99.8 kWh (Long Range) | AWD | 283 kW (385 PS; 380 hp) at 4,000–7,800 rpm | 600 N⋅m (443 lbf⋅ft) at 0–3,800 rpm | 5.3 s | 200 km/h (124 mph) |

=== Concepts ===
==== EV9 Concept ====
The EV9 was first unveiled as the Kia EV9 Concept at the 2021 Los Angeles Auto Show, featuring three rows of seats. The concept car features an interior that can transform into a meeting room. The Kia EV9 offers two battery options: a 76 kWh battery or a 100 kWh battery. The real world range is estimated to be around 400 km (250 mi) for the smaller battery and 500 km (310 mi) for the larger battery.

== Markets ==
=== East Asia ===
==== Taiwan ====
The EV9 was launched in Taiwan on 19 June 2024, with two variants: Earth RWD and GT Line e-AWD.

=== Europe ===
The EV9 was released in Europe in June 2023 and made its debut at the 2023 Goodwood Festival of Speed, with Belgium being the first European country to release specifications. For the European market, it is only available with the Long Range powertrain.

=== Latin America ===
==== Brazil ====
The EV9 was launched in Brazil on 18 February 2025, in the sole unnamed variant using the Long Range AWD powertrain.

=== North America ===
The EV9 was released in the North American market in October 2023. For North America, it is available with either Standard Range RWD (for the entry-level model) and Long Range AWD powertrains. For the US, three trim levels are available: Light, Wind, Land and GT Line, whereas in Canada, the Land trim in the Canadian market can be optioned with Premium and GT Line packages.

In May 2024, EV9 began local assembly at the Kia Manufacturing Georgia (KMMG) plant, as the first Kia battery electric vehicle to be assembled in the United States.

=== Oceania ===
==== Australia ====
The EV9 was launched in Australia on 3 November 2023, in three trim levels: Air, Earth and GT Line. It is available with either Standard Range RWD and Long Range AWD powertrains.

==== New Zealand ====
The EV9 was released in New Zealand in August 2023, in three trim levels: Light, Earth and GT Line. It is available with either Standard Range RWD and Long Range AWD powertrains.

=== South Asia ===
==== India ====
The EV9 was launched in India on 3 October 2024 alongside the Carnival. Imported from South Korea,it is available in a sole GT Line variant using the Long Range AWD powertrain.

==== Pakistan ====
Kia announced the EV9 in Pakistan on 3 February 2025. Only the Long Range version has been announced initially.

=== Southeast Asia ===
==== Indonesia ====
The EV9 made its ASEAN debut starting in Indonesia on 10 August 2023 at the 31st Gaikindo Indonesia International Auto Show, in a sole GT Line Long Range variant. Indonesia was chosen as the first country in Southeast Asia to launch the EV9 due to its productive growth of the electrified vehicle market. The Earth Long Range variant was added in July 2024.

==== Malaysia ====
The EV9 was launched in Malaysia on 11 June 2024, in a sole GT Line trim using the Long Range powertrain and available in either 7 and 6-seater configurations.

==== Philippines ====
The EV9 was launched in the Philippines at the 2024 Philippines International Motor Show on 24 October 2024, with two variants: Baseline RWD and GT Line AWD.

==== Singapore ====
The EV9 was launched in Singapore on 11 January 2024, in the sole GT Line Long Range AWD variant.

==== Thailand ====
The EV9 was launched in Thailand on 1 March 2024, with deliveries started later in April. Two variants are available: Earth Long Range RWD and GT Line Long Range AWD.

== Safety ==
=== Euro NCAP ===
Euro NCAP test results Kia EV9 (2023)
| Test | Points | % |
|---|---|---|
| Overall: | 5 /5 stars | |
| Adult occupant: | 33.6 | 84% |
| Child occupant: | 43.2 | 88% |
| Pedestrian: | 48.4 | 76% |
| Safety assist: | 15.0 | 83% |

=== IIHS ===
The 2024 EV9 was awarded "Top Safety Pick" by IIHS, which applies to vehicles built after January 2024, when Kia adjusted the headlights equipped on the Land and GT-Line trims to reduce glare to meet all those requirements.

IIHS scores (2024)
| Small overlap front | Good | |
| Moderate overlap front (original test) | Good | |
| Side (updated test) | Good | |
| Headlights | Poor | Good |
| Front crash prevention (Vehicle-to-Pedestrian) | Good | |
| Seatbelt reminders | Good | |
| Child seat anchors (LATCH) ease of use | Good | |

=== ANCAP ===
ANCAP test results Kia EV9 all variants (2023, aligned with Euro NCAP)
| Test | Points | % |
|---|---|---|
| Overall: | 5 /5 stars | |
| Adult occupant: | 33.65 | 84% |
| Child occupant: | 42.65 | 87% |
| Pedestrian: | 48.42 | 76% |
| Safety assist: | 15.43 | 85% |

== Awards and distinctions ==
- Family Car of the Year

In November 2023, Kia EV9 was selected as the 'Family Car of the Year' by Top Gear.

- Driving Electric Car of the Year 2024

Later in December 2023, Kia EV9 was chosen as the 'DrivingElectric Car' of the Year 2024. It also won the 'German Luxury Car' of the Year 2024.

- 2024 10 Best Trucks and SUVs Award by Car and Driver

It also won a 2024 10Best Trucks and SUVs Award by Car and Driver.

- 2024 North American Car, Truck and Utility Vehicle of the Year (NACTOY) Awards

In 2024, it won the North American Utility Vehicle of the Year at the 2024 North American Car, Truck and Utility Vehicle of the Year (NACTOY) Awards.

- Best Electric 7-Seater at the 2024 What Car? Awards

Kia EV9 also won the title "Best Electric 7-Seater" at the 2024 What Car? Awards.

- 2024 World Car of the Year

It won the 2024 Car of the Year at the New York International Auto Show.

- 2024 The Red Dot Awards Product Design

Kia EV9 wins 'Best of the Best' in the Cars and Motorcycles category.

== Sales ==
| Calendar year | South Korea | United States | Europe |
|---|---|---|---|
| 2023 | 8,052 | 1,118 | 2,856 |
| 2024 | 2,012 | 22,017 | 10,750 |
| 2025 | | 15,051 | |
