= BMW CS Concept =

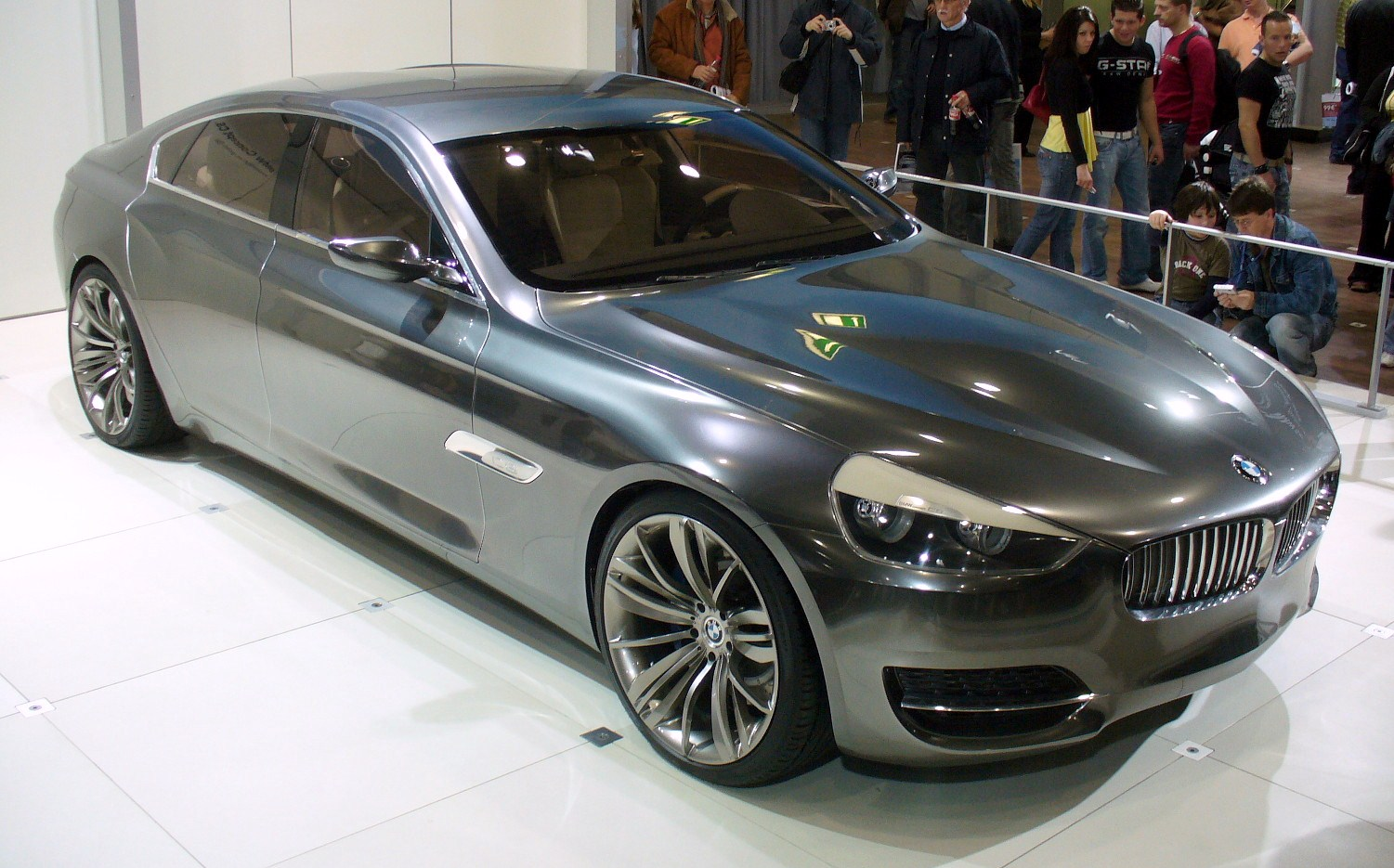

Overview
- Manufacturer: BMW
- Production: 2007 (concept car)
- Designer: Karim Habib under Adrian van Hooydonk

Body and chassis
- Class: Concept car
- Body style: 4-door fastback saloon
- Related: BMW 7 Series (E65)

Powertrain
- Engine: 6.0 L S85 V12

Dimensions
- Wheelbase: 3,142.0 mm (123.7 in)
- Length: 5,100.3 mm (200.8 in)
- Height: 1,358.9 mm (53.5 in)

The BMW CS Concept is a concept car was first displayed by the German car manufacturer BMW in 2007 at the Shanghai Auto Show. BMW claimed that CS Concept could be produced, following positive initial comments in 2007 by BMW dealers. This was followed up in 2008 by an announcement by BMW that the concept would be put into production in the form of the BMW Gran Turismo. BMW later cancelled plans for production in November 2008 because of financial reasons amidst a global economic crisis.

== Design and features ==
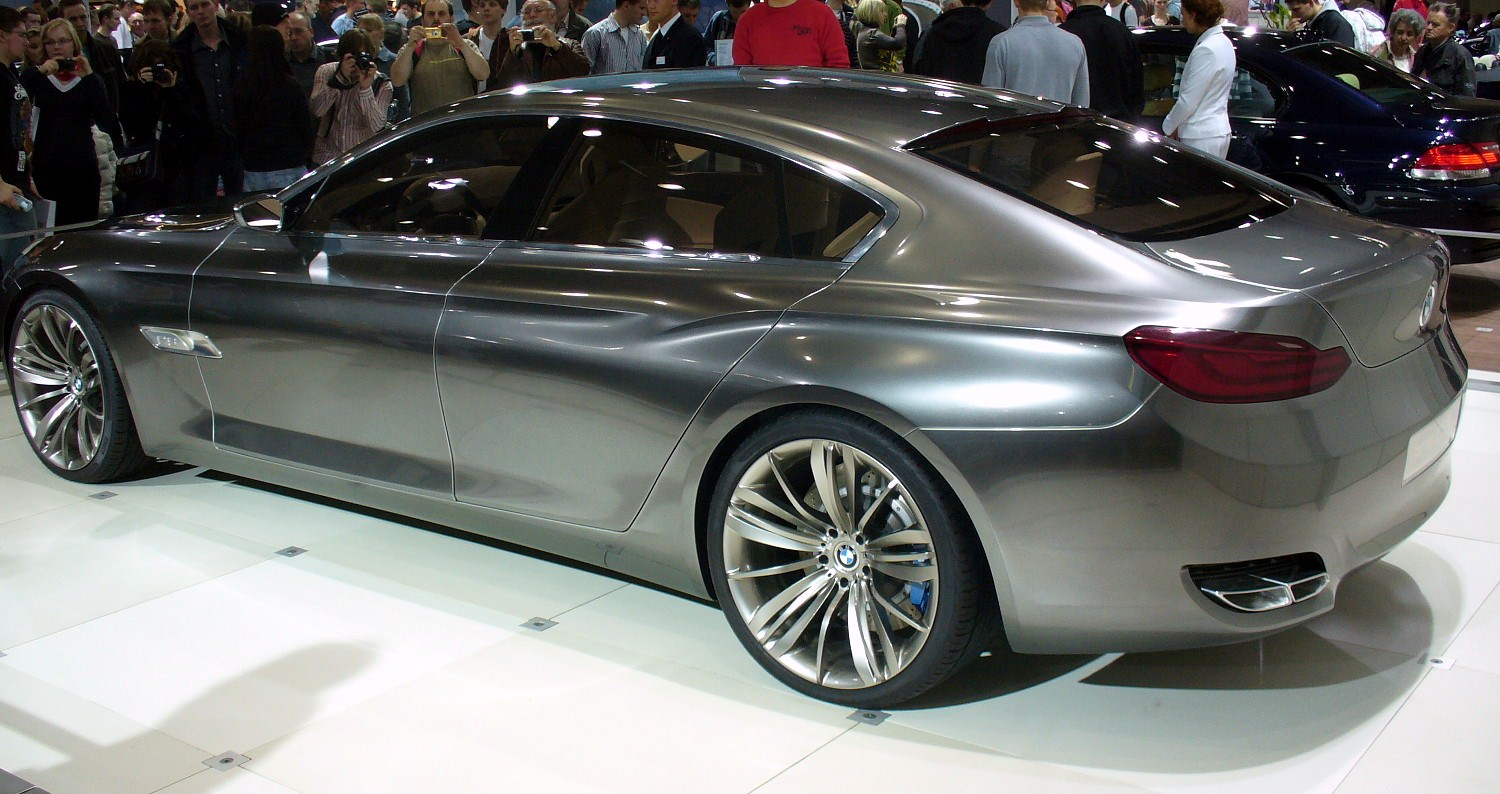
Rear view

Based on the 7 Series (E65) platform, the CS Concept features future design cues on BMW automobiles. The front fascia features the BMW trademark split-kidney grille, which is larger than previous BMW models and now integrated with the bumper. There are also turning indicators on the side. The headlights contain an "eyebrow". At the rear, the vehicle has rectangular tailpipes integrated in the bumper. The CS features a modified version of the BMW S85 V10 engine with two more cylinders and an enlarged displacement of 6.0-litres.

The CS Concept is a fastback sedan that features many new innovations for BMW, such as door handles that only come out when sensors detect motion. It has dimensions slightly bigger than the BMW 7 Series (E65).

== Influences ==
The design cues from the BMW CS Concept can be found on the 2009 BMW 7 Series (F01) sedan, the 2010 BMW 5 Series Gran Turismo (F07) fastback, 2011 BMW 5 Series (F10) sedan, and the 2012 BMW 6 Series (F12/13/F06) Coupe/Convertible and Gran Coupe (a four-door coupe). The 2012 BMW 3 Series (F30) also have these exterior features as well.
