= Kia EV6 =

Battery electric compact crossover SUV

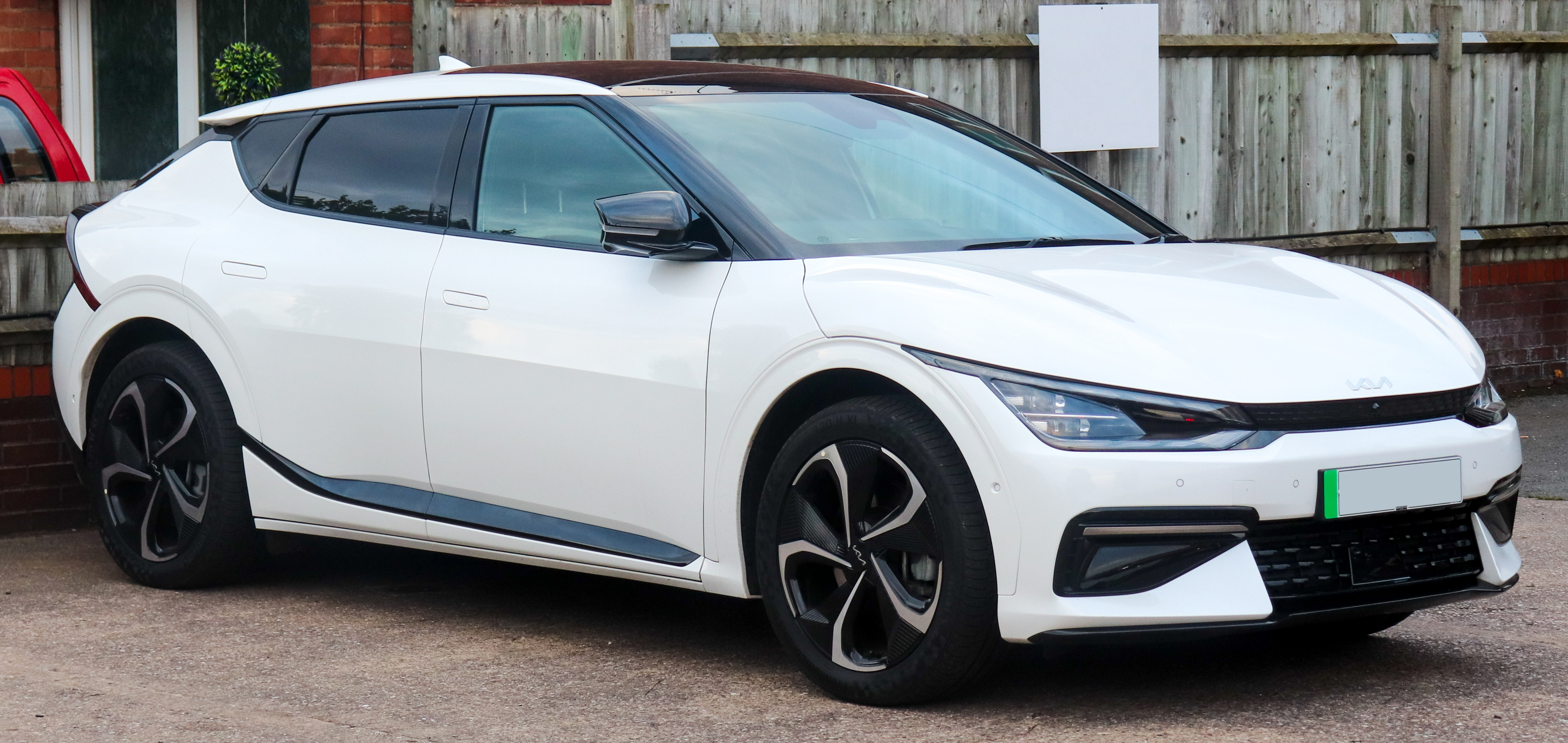

Overview
- Manufacturer: Kia
- Model code: CV
- Production: 2021–present
- Model years: 2022–present (Global, US) 2022–2025 (Canada)
- Assembly: South Korea: Hwaseong (Autoland Hwasung); United States: West Point, Georgia (KMMG)
- Designer: Lee Hyo-Sung and Choi Hong-Seok

Body and chassis
- Class: Compact crossover SUV
- Body style: 5-door SUV
- Layout: Rear-motor, rear-wheel-drive; Dual-motor, all-wheel-drive
- Platform: Hyundai E-GMP
- Related: Hyundai Ioniq 5; Hyundai Ioniq 6; Hyundai Ioniq 9; Kia EV9; Genesis GV60

Powertrain
- Electric motor: Permanent magnet synchronous motor
- Power output: 125–430 kW (170–585 PS; 168–577 hp)
- Transmission: Single-speed reduction gear
- Battery: 58 kWh or 77.4 kWh or 84.0 kWh battery nickel-cobalt-manganese lithium
- Electric range: Up to 510 km (317 mi)
- Plug-in charging: AC: 11 kW; DC: 180 kW (58 kWh battery) 240 kW (77.4 kWh battery); Vehicle-to-load (V2L): 1.9 kW (international) 3.6 kW (Europe)

Dimensions
- Wheelbase: 2,900 mm (114.2 in)
- Length: 4,680–4,695 mm (184.3–184.8 in)
- Width: 1,880–1,890 mm (74.0–74.4 in)
- Height: 1,550 mm (61.0 in); 1,545 mm (60.8 in) (GT)
- Curb weight: 1,825–2,090 kg (4,023–4,608 lb)

The Kia EV6 (Korean: 기아 EV6) is a battery electric compact crossover SUV produced by Kia since 2021. It is the first Kia dedicated electric vehicle, and the first model developed on the Electric Global Modular Platform (E-GMP) similar to the Hyundai Ioniq 5.

It is also the first model to be named under the new nomenclature designated for a line of Kia electric cars, EV series, which will range from EV1 to EV9.

The EV6 was the 2022 European Car of the Year.

== Overview ==
Kia released the first photographs of the EV6 on 15 March 2021, and later fully released on 2 August 2021.

Developed under the codename CV, it is the first Kia model based on the E-GMP electric car platform.

Outside, the EV6 features a tiger nose for the front fascia. For the side profile, it has shooting-brake-like styling due to its sleek roofline and features the connected braking lights at the rear.

Inside, it features a panoramic curved display panel inside, which opens up more space while a controller for transition between infotainment and HVAC below the navigation screen and touch buttons for using heated seat as well as steering wheel further enhance driver usability. The EV6's boot space is 520 L (18.4 cu ft) (VDA standard) and it can be increased up to 1,300 L (45.9 cu ft) when the rear seats are folded. The crossover is claimed to be furnished with eco-friendly materials across the interior, fabric or artificial suede/leatherette seats, and ambient lighting. It's also available with an augmented reality head-up display, 360° camera option, remote controlled parking, along with safety technologies including Lane Follow Assist, Highway Driving Assist 2 (semi-autonomous adaptive cruise control) including auto lane changing, AEB collision avoidance, remote smart parking assist and Safe Exit Assist.

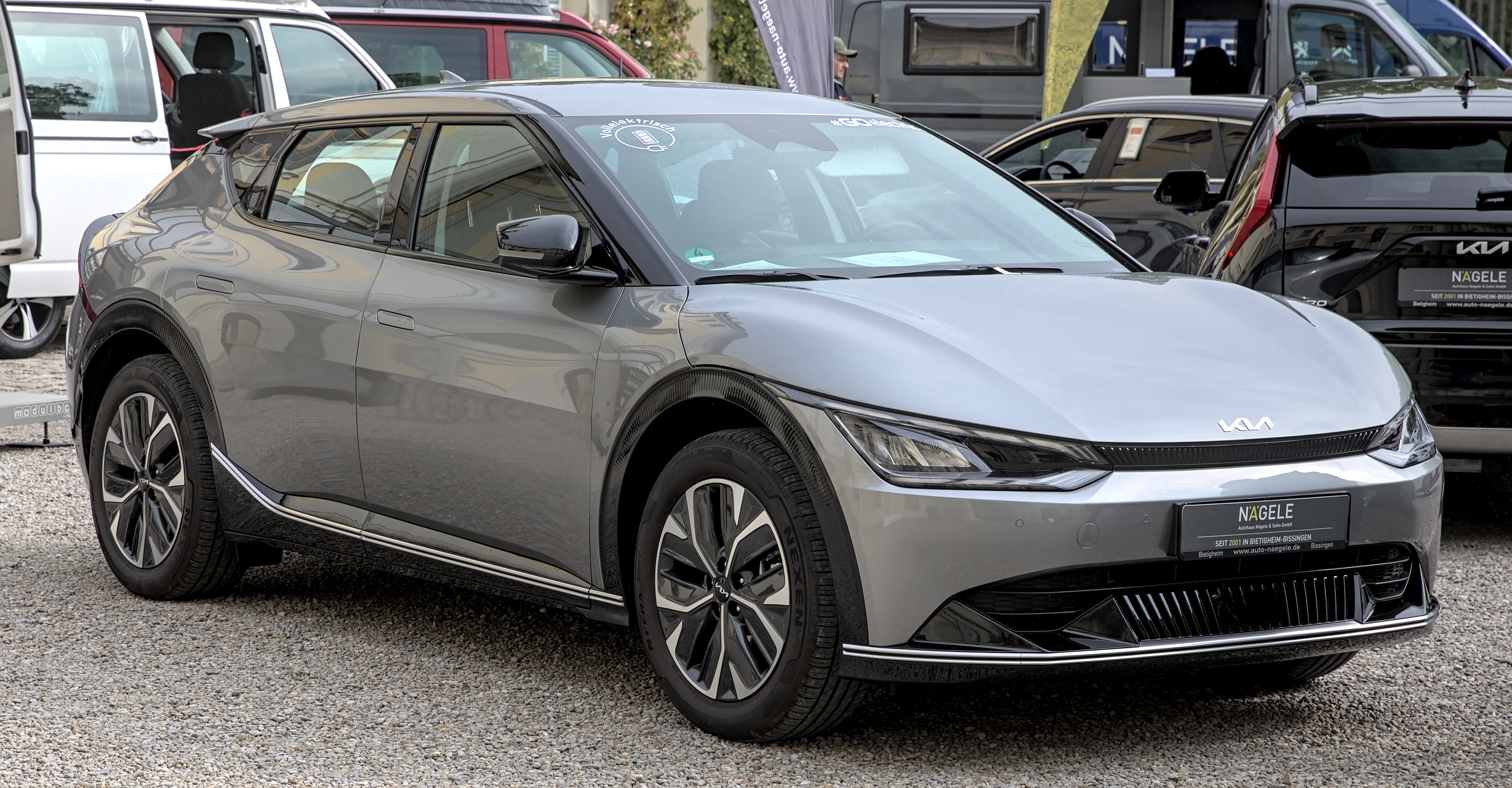
Kia EV6 Air Long Range (pre-facelift)

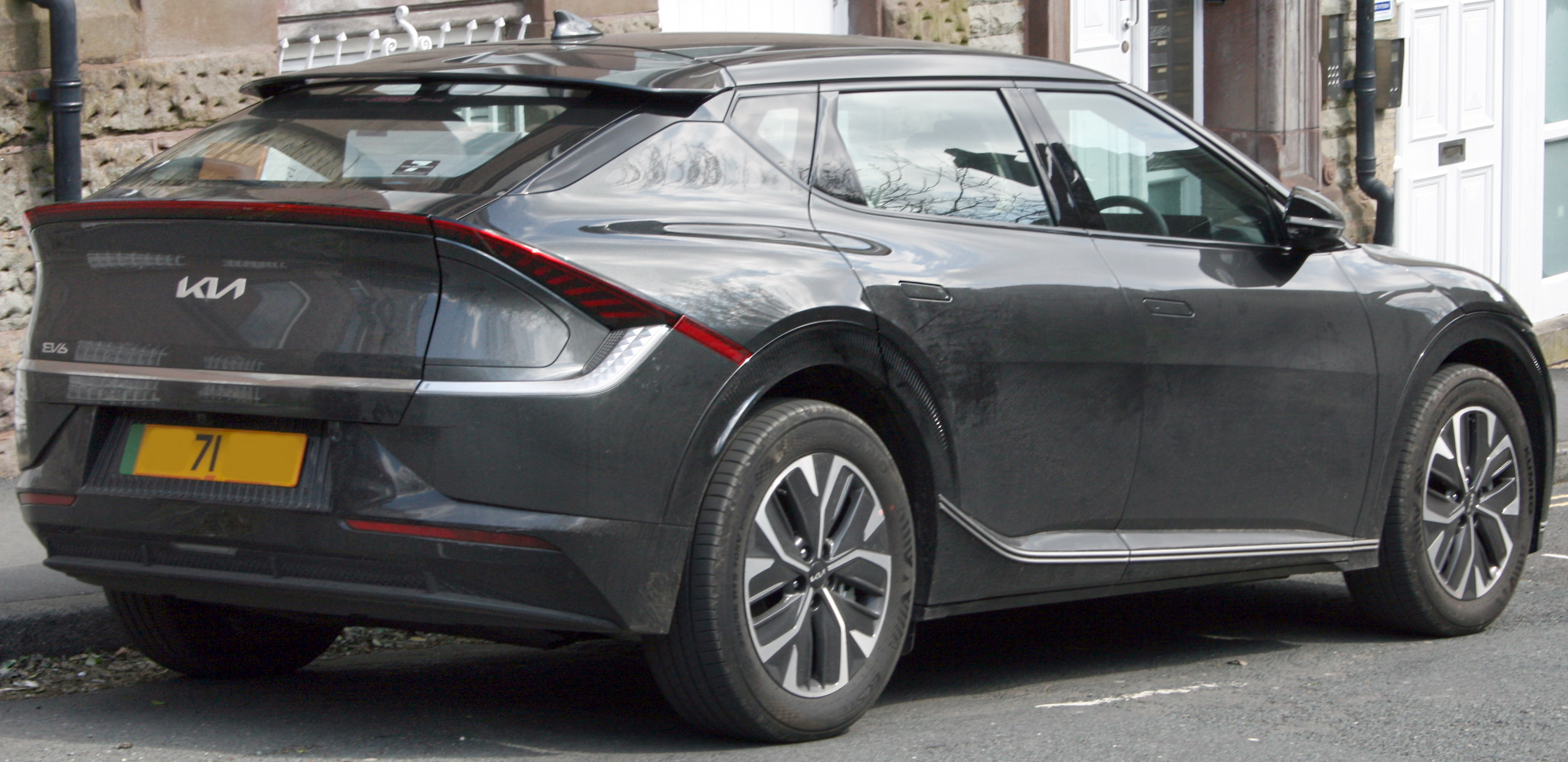
2022 EV6 Air Long Range (pre-facelift)

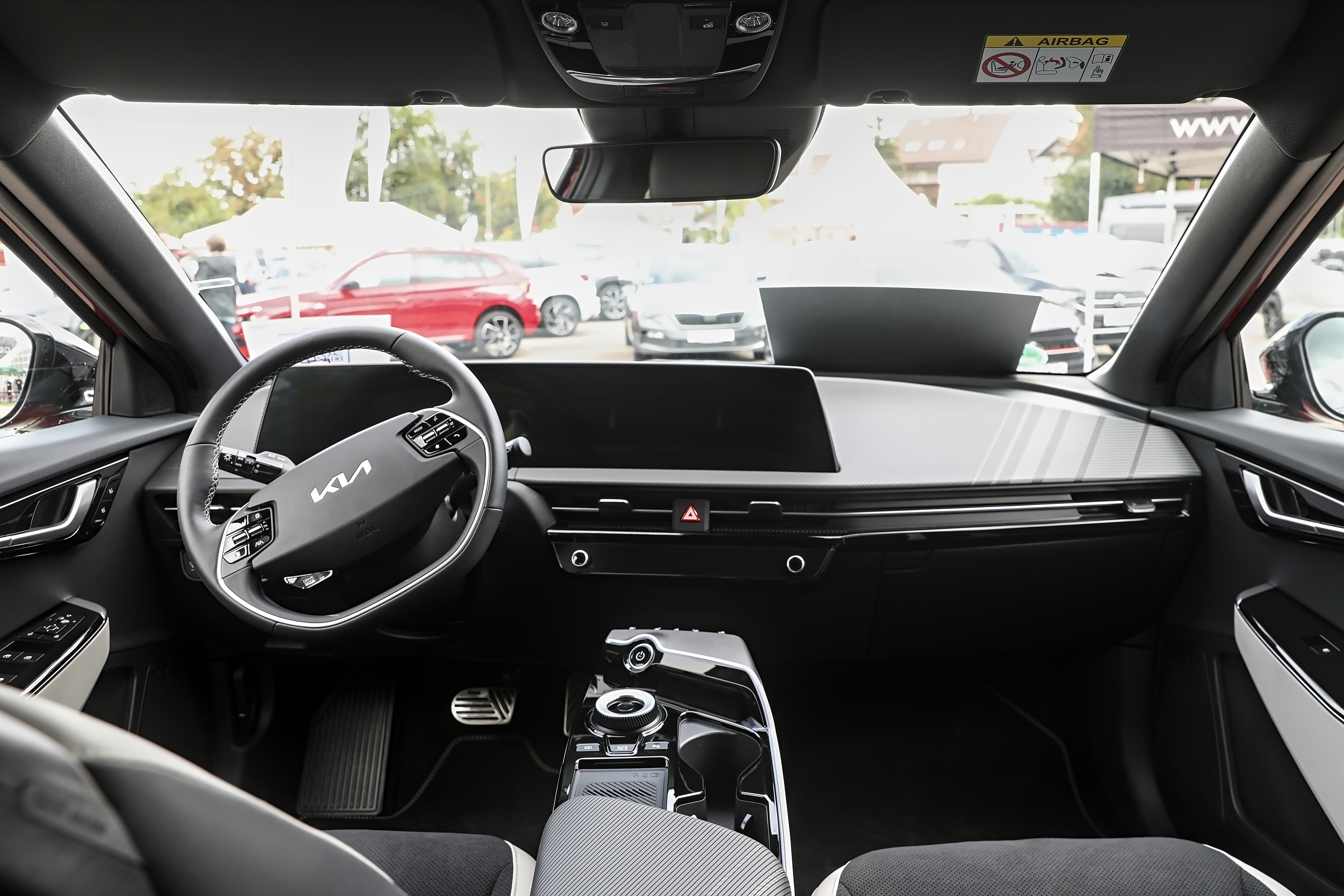
Interior

=== GT-Line ===
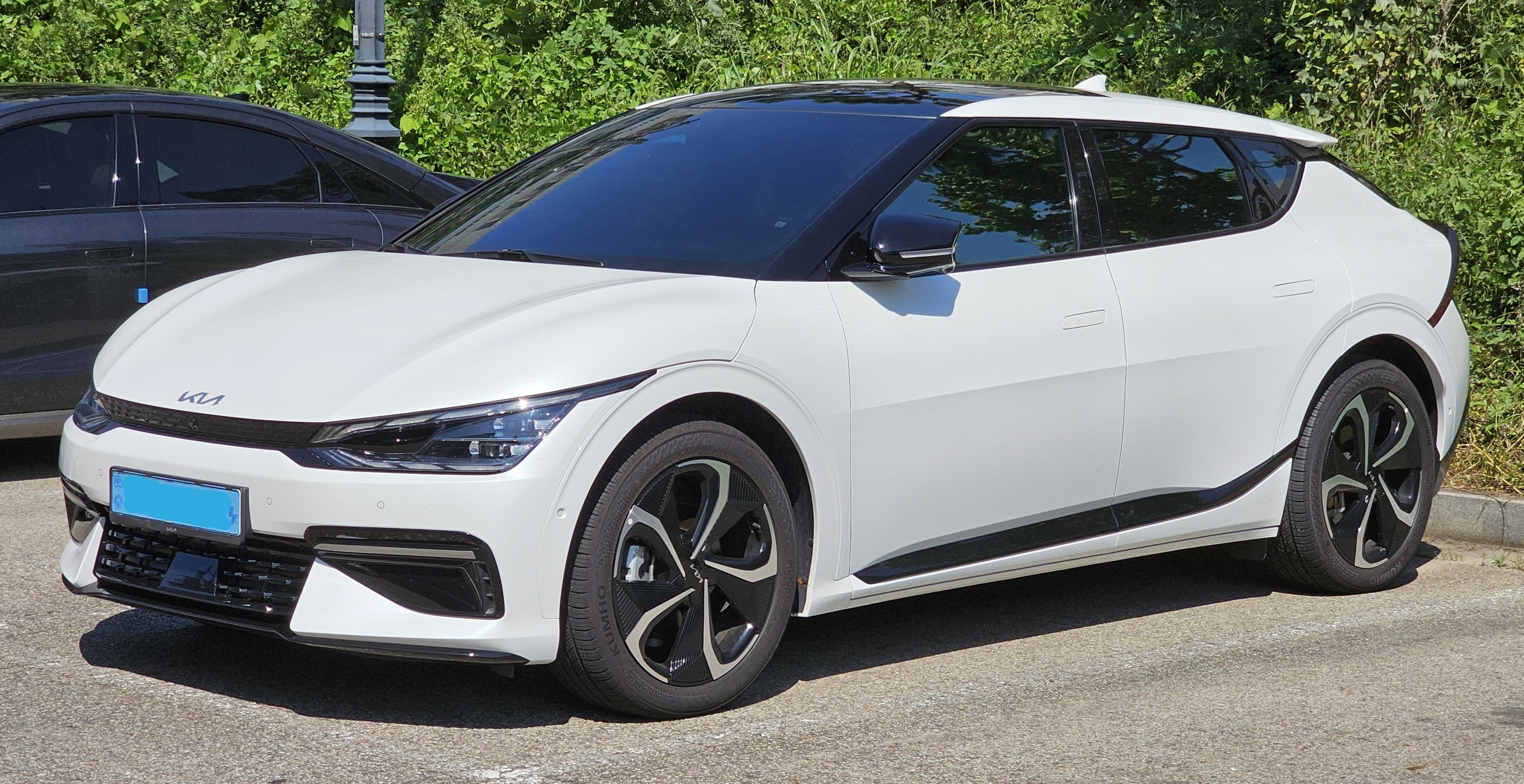
EV6 GT Line (pre-facelift)

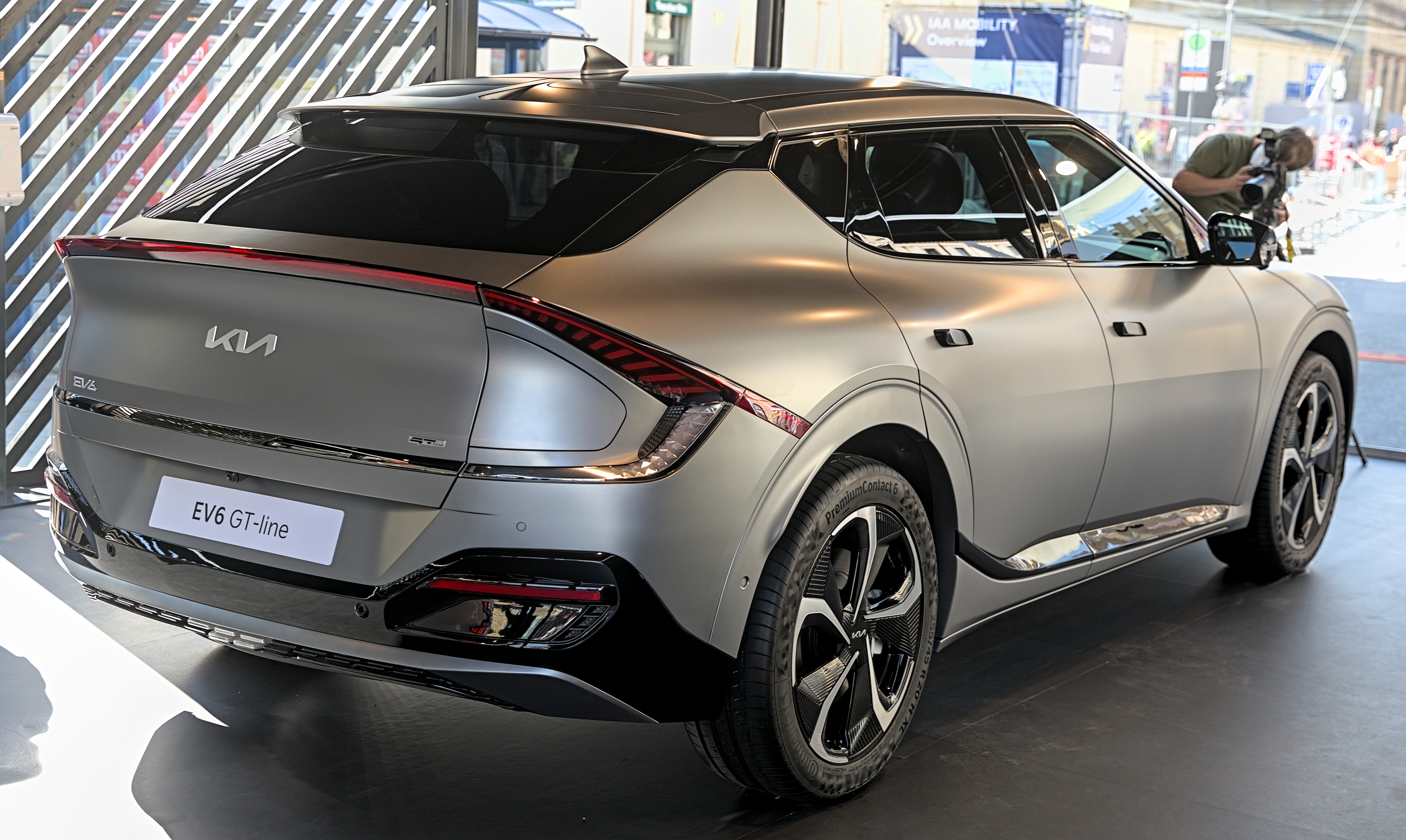
Rear view (pre-facelift)

=== EV6 GT ===
The EV6 GT was released on 4 October 2022; it is a high-performance version of the EV6, supposed to go from zero to 100 km/h in 3.5 seconds. The EV6 GT features four-piston calipers with a monoblock front wheel that improves size/performance over the base model, and a body strengthened with front strut ring and rear luggage floor reinforcement bars. There's also Michelin Pilot Sport 4S tyres, a rear electronic limited-slip differential, and electronically controlled suspension.

The GT model features dual electric motors producing 430 kW (585 PS; 577 hp) of power and 740 Nm of torque combined, Michelin Pilot Sport 4S tyres, a rear electronic limited-slip differential, electronically controlled suspension, and minor exterior and interior changes.

In addition, rack-driven power steering and variable gear ratio technology optimises steering response to speed, and GT Mode with RBM function that maximizes the use of regenerative braking and Kia's first Drift Mode are applied.

The design features GT-specific 21-inch wheels with contrasting neon green coloured brake calipers, vertical elements across the front Digital Tiger Nose Grille, front and rear bumpers, and a rear diffuser. The interior is equipped with unique sports bucket seats with neon green piping and stitching, artificial suede door cards, and a GT Mode button on the steering wheel.

However, compared to regular EV6 models, the EV6 GT does not come with ventilated seat functionality, electric seat adjustment, auto dip-down wing mirrors when reversing, and has less claimed driving range with higher energy consumption.

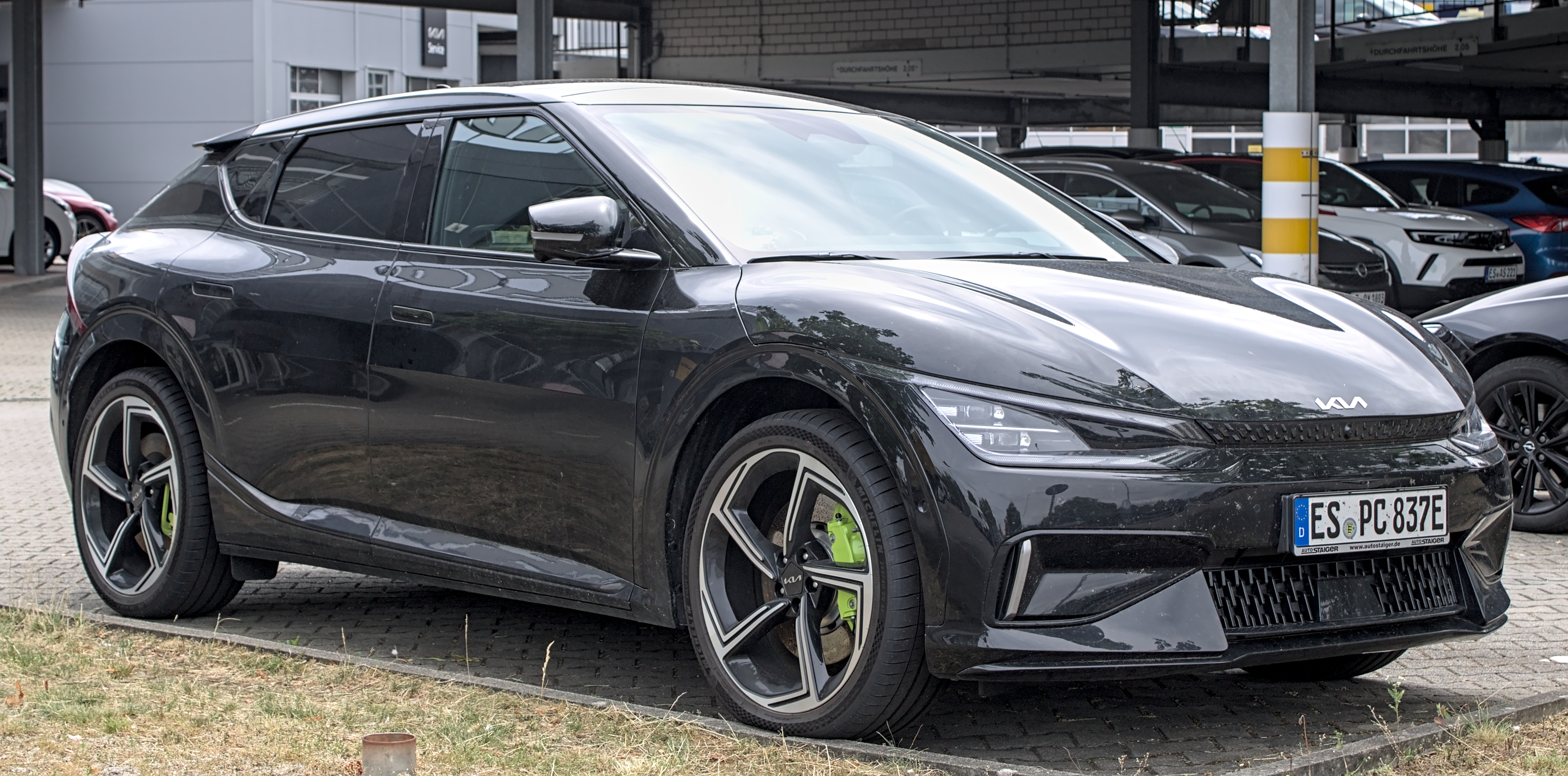
2021 EV6 GT (pre-facelift)

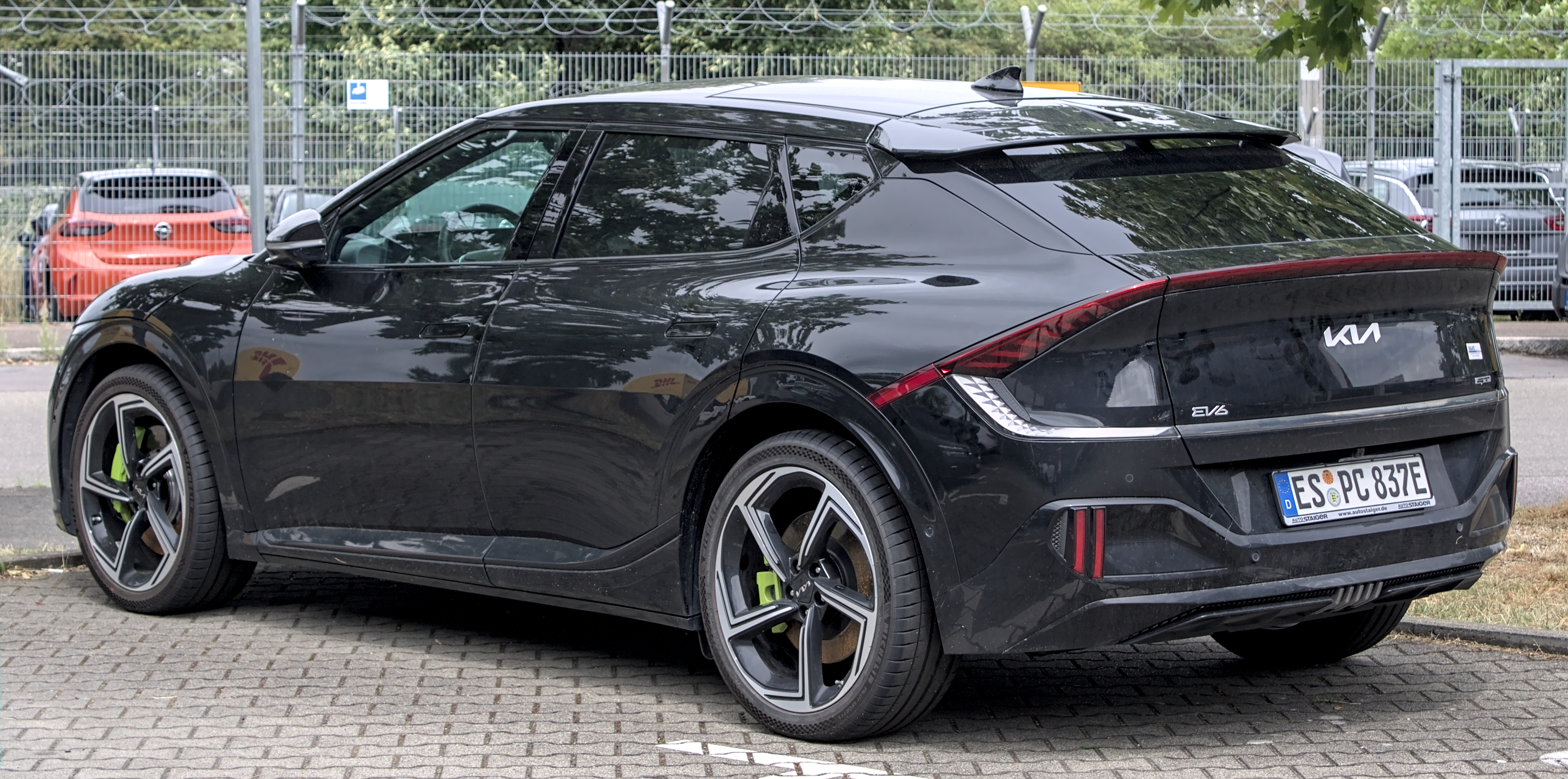
Rear view (pre-facelift)

=== Facelift ===
The facelifted EV6 was revealed on 14 May 2024. Changes include new angular-designed LED headlights and daytime running lights, a redesigned front fascia, new alloy wheel designs, a revamped interior with a revised curved panoramic screen, a new steering wheel, a new fingerprint authentication system that allows registered drivers to power the electronics without the key, updated technological features and a new 84 kWh battery pack that replaces the 77.4 kWh pack.

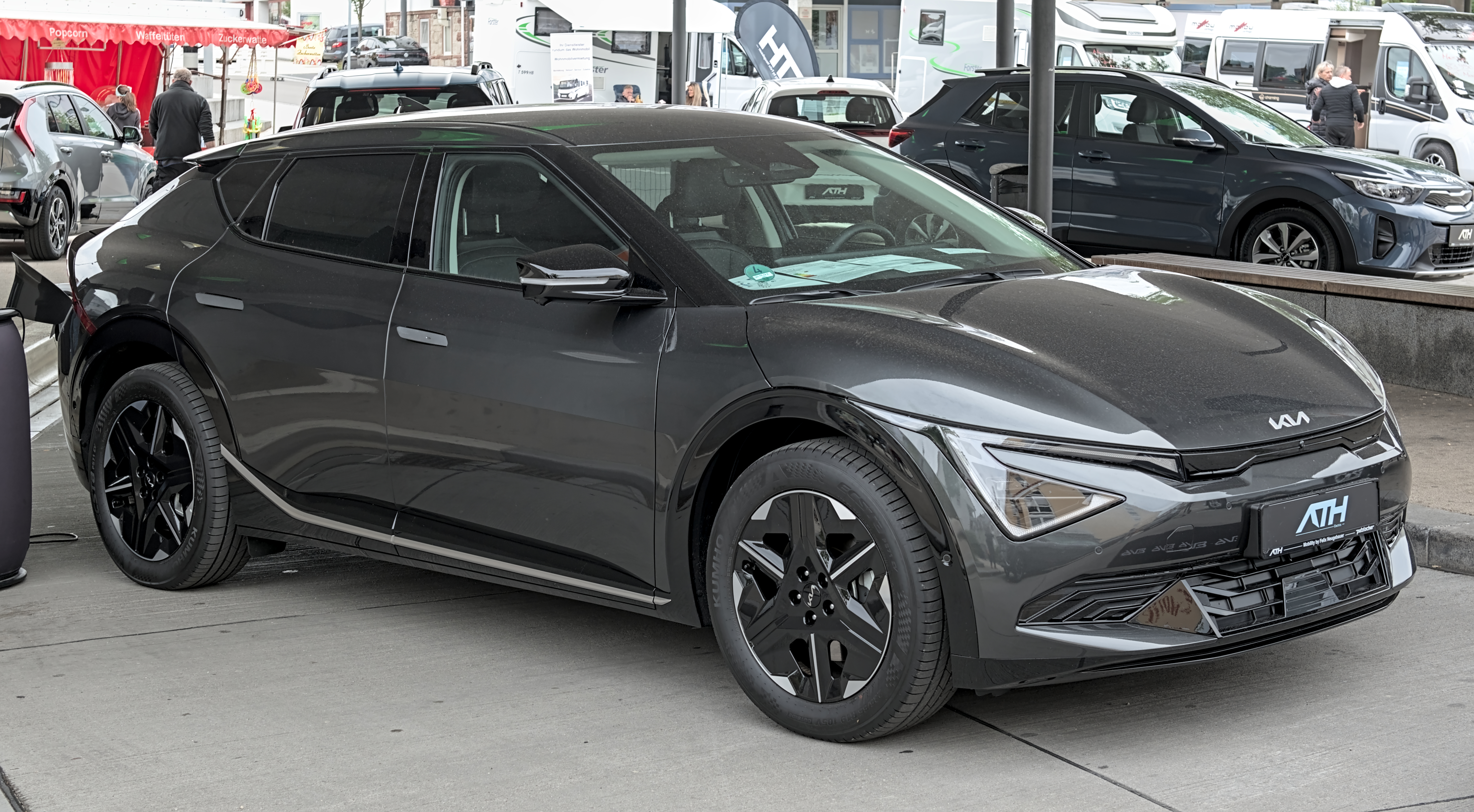
Facelift EV6 (front)

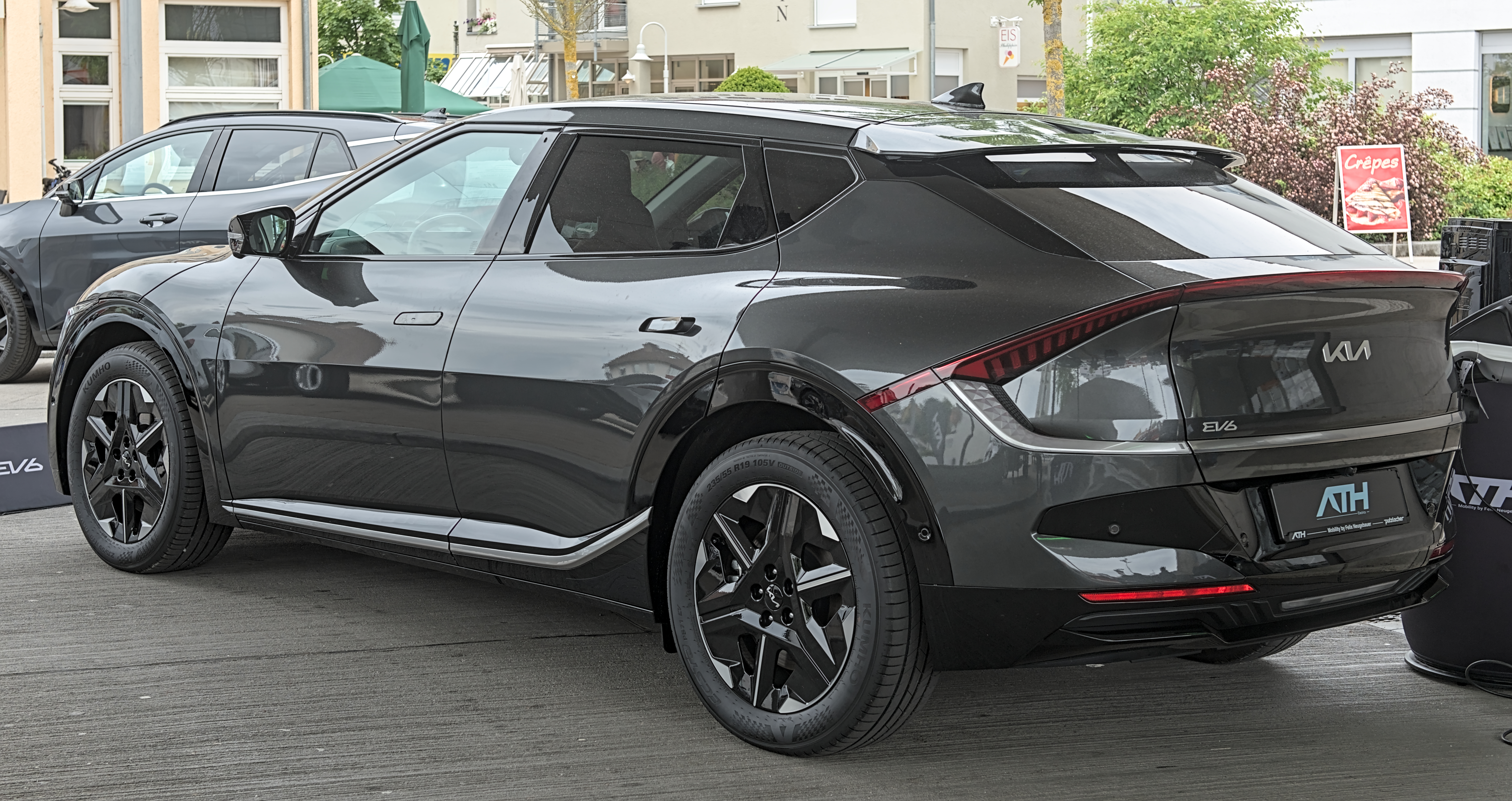
Facelift EV6 (rear)

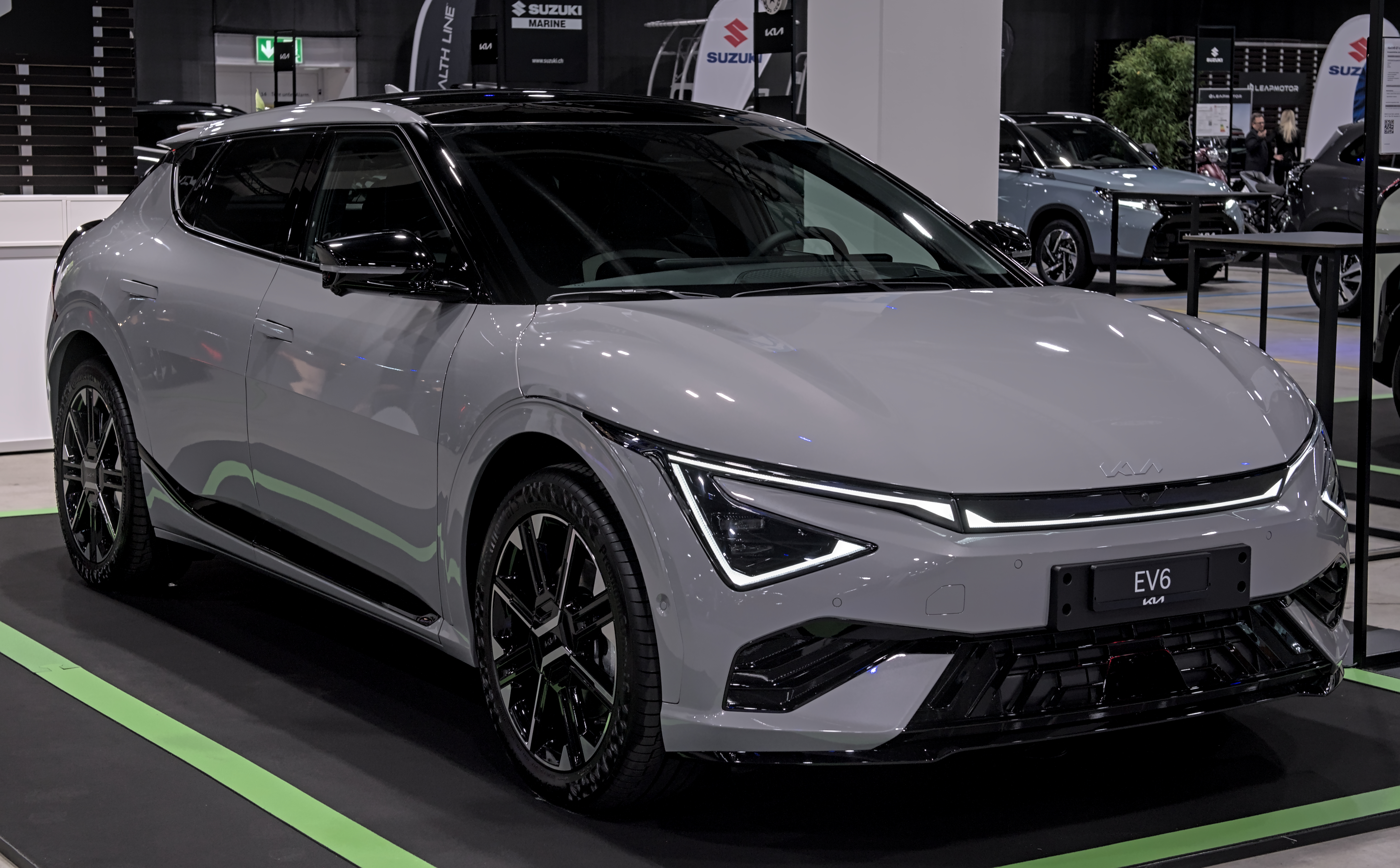
Facelift EV6 GT-Line (front)

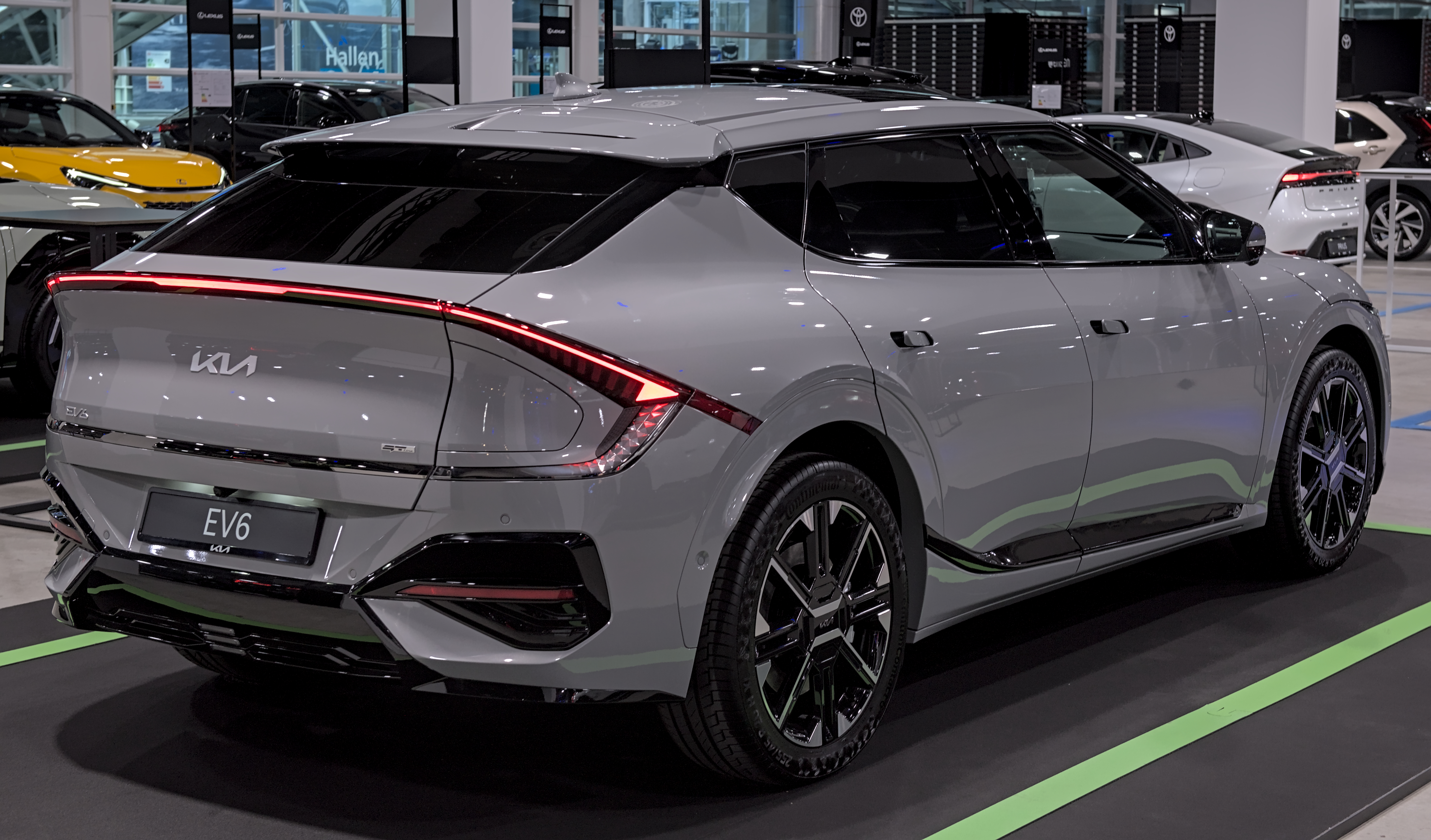
Facelift EV6 GT-Line (rear)

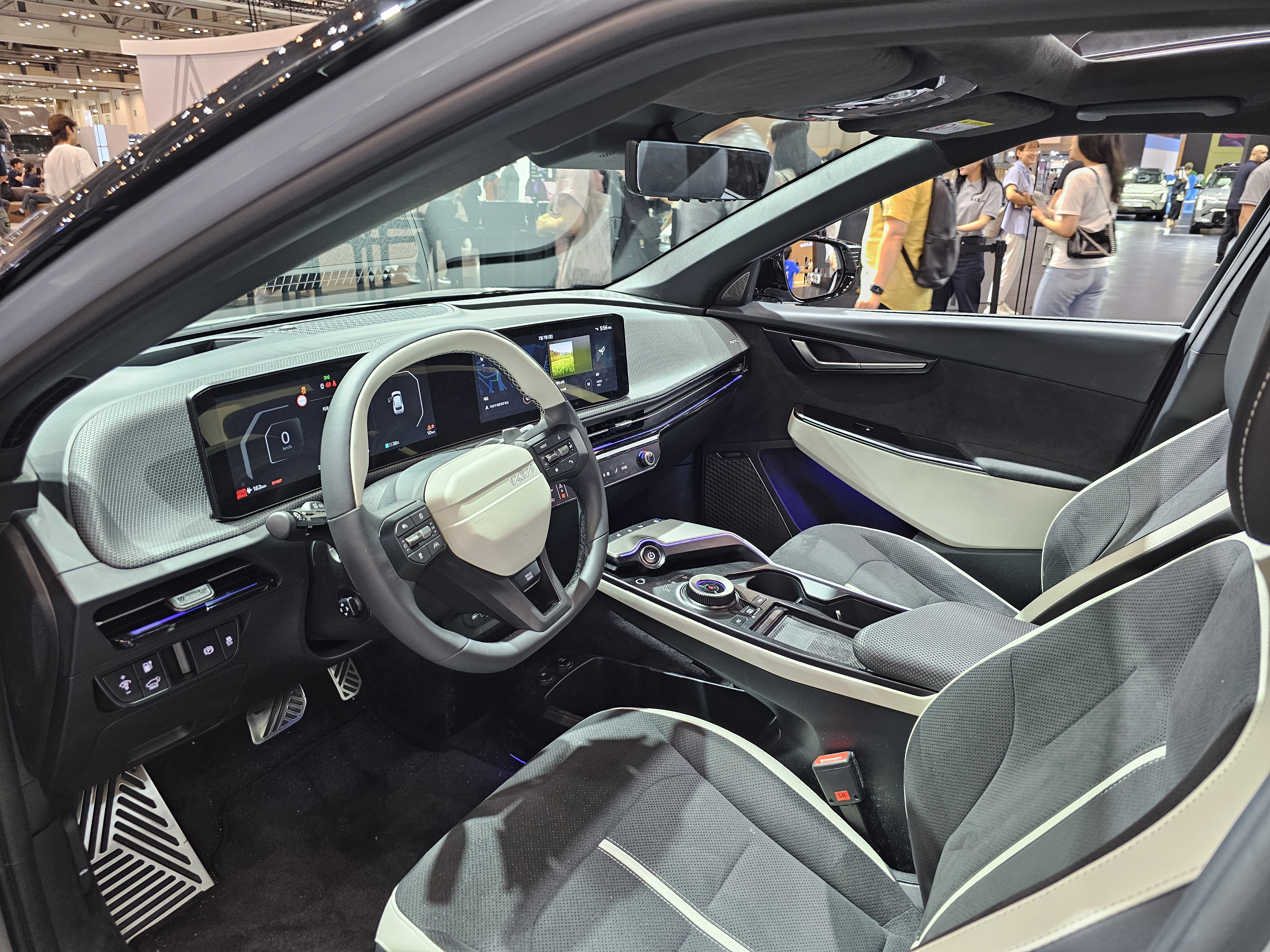
Facelift EV6 GT-Line (interior)

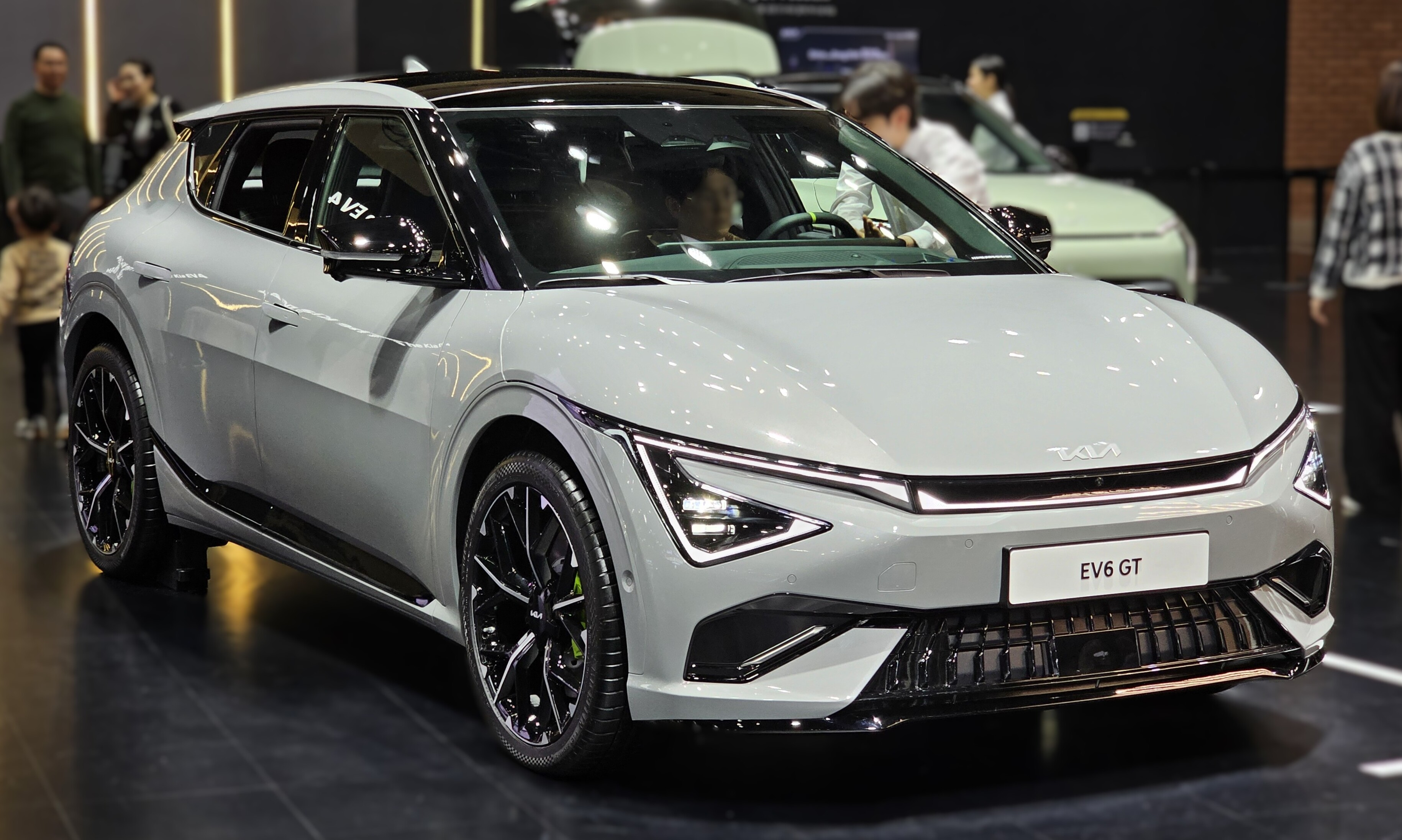
Facelift EV6 GT

== Powertrains ==
Trim	Battery	Layout	Power	Torque	0–100 km/h (0-62 mph) (Official)	Top speed	Charging time			
Trim	Battery	Layout	Power	Torque	0–100 km/h (0-62 mph) (Official)	Top speed	AC 230V/10A (2.3 KW) (0–100%)	AC 230V/16A 3P (11 KW) (0–100%)	DC Fast Charging (50 KW) (0–80%)	DC Fast Charging (180 KW) (0–80%)
Standard Range	58 kWh	2WD	125 kW (170 PS; 168 hp)	350 N⋅m (258 lb⋅ft)	8.5s	185 km/h (115 mph)	24 hr 40 min	6 hr	1 hr 3 min	18 min
Standard Range	58 kWh	4WD	173 kW (235 PS; 232 hp)	605 N⋅m (446 lb⋅ft)		185 km/h (115 mph)	24 hr 40 min	6 hr	1 hr 3 min	18 min
Long Range	77.4 kWh	2WD	168 kW (228 PS; 225 hp) at 4,600–9,200 rpm	350 N⋅m (258 lb⋅ft) at 0–2,600 rpm	7.3s	185 km/h (115 mph)	32 hr 45 min	7 hr 20 min	1 hr 13 min	18 min
Long Range	77.4 kWh	4WD	239 kW (325 PS; 321 hp) at 6,800–9,200 rpm	605 N⋅m (446 lb⋅ft) at 0–4,400 rpm	5.2s	185 km/h (115 mph)	32 hr 45 min	7 hr 20 min	1 hr 13 min	18 min
GT	77.4 kWh	4WD	430 kW (585 PS; 577 hp) at 6,800–9,000 rpm	740 N⋅m (546 lb⋅ft) at 0–4,200 rpm	3.5s	260 km/h (162 mph)	32 hr 45 min	7 hr 20 min	1 hr 13 min	18 min

== Markets ==
=== Europe ===
In May 2021, Kia obtained more than 33,000 prospects including 7,300 reservations across Europe since factory orders opened in late March 2021. First deliveries for the European market commenced in September 2021, it is available in standard, GT Line and GT derivatives.

=== Mexico ===
The EV6 went on sale in Mexico in November 2023 and launched later on 7 December, in two variants: GT Line and GT, both variants used the Long Range powertrain.

=== North America ===
The EV6 was released in North America in January 2022. In the US, it comes in Light, Wind and GT Line trims. In Canada, it comes as a base model with the two-tier option of a GT Line package. It is available with either Standard Range and Long Range powertrains.

Manufacturing of most EV6 variants for the North American market is expected to move to Kia's West Point, Georgia, assembly plant for the 2025 model year, with production expected to begin in early calendar year 2025. However, vehicles with the GT trim level will still be manufactured in Korea. This is expected to make the Georgia-made EV6 models eligible for the US federal EV tax credit. On Georgia-made vehicles, 2025 also swaps the CCS charging port for the Tesla-style NACS / SAE J3400 port and moves the charge port location from the rear passenger (right-hand) side to the rear driver (left-hand) side of the car.

In Canada, the EV6 GT was discontinued after the 2024 model year due to low demand. Canadian sales of the EV6 ceased after the 2025 model year, with the similarly sized EV5 serving as its replacement.

=== Oceania ===
==== Australia ====
The EV6 went on sale in Australia on 25 February 2022, in three variants: Air, GT Line RWD and GT Line AWD, with all variants use the Long Range powertrain. The high performance GT model introduced in January 2023.

The facelifted EV6 went on sale in Australia on 14 January 2026, with variants and powertrain choices remain unchanged from the pre-facelift model. However, all variants were upgraded to a larger 84 kWh lithium-ion battery pack.

==== New Zealand ====
The EV6 was launched in New Zealand on 30 March 2022, in three trim levels: Air, Earth and GT Line. It is available with either Standard Range and Long Range powertrains, with AWD dual-motor setup available on the upper two trim levels (optional on Earth, standard on GT Line). The high performance GT model debuted in March 2023.

=== Southeast Asia ===
The EV6 was launched in Malaysia on 24 June 2022, in Indonesia on 11 August 2022 at the 29th Gaikindo Indonesia International Auto Show with sales later commenced in December 2022, in Singapore on 23 November 2022, and in Philippines on 21 March 2023.

=== Taiwan ===
The EV6 was launched in Taiwan on 19 April 2022, with four variants: Light Standard, Air Standard, Air Extended Range, and GT-line e-AWD Extended Range. The EV6 GT was introduced in Taiwan on 6 November 2023.

The facelifted EV6 was launched in Taiwan on 10 June 2025, with three variants: Light Standard, Air Extended Range, and GT-line Extended Range.

== Awards ==
- 'Best of the Best' in 2022 Red Dot Design Awards
- 2022: European Car of the Year
- 2022: Irish Car of the Year
- 2022: What Car? Car of the Year
- 'Premium' winner in the German Car of the Year 2022 awards
- 'Crossover of the Year' at the TopGear.com 2021 awards
- Joint winner of the inaugural 'Best Cars of the Year' 2021/2022 awards
- Product Carbon Footprint certificate from United Kingdom's The Carbon Trust.
- 2023: the Indian Car of the Year (ICOTY) Green car awards
- 2023: North American Utility Vehicle of the Year
- 2023: MotorWeek Driver's Choice best of the year

=== EV6 GT ===
- 2023: the World Performance Car of the Year award

== Safety ==
=== Euro NCAP ===
Euro NCAP test results Kia EV6 Long Range AWD (LHD) (2022)
Test	Points	%
Overall:	5 /5 stars	
Adult occupant:	34.5	90%
Child occupant:	42.2	86%
Pedestrian:	35.1	64%
Safety assist:	14.0	87%

=== IIHS ===
The 2022 EV6 became the third Kia vehicle to be awarded "Top Safety Pick+" by the IIHS, with a Good rating in six separate crash tests.

IIHS scores (2022)
Small overlap front (driver)	Good	
Small overlap front (passenger)	Good	
Moderate overlap front (original test)	Good	
Side (original test)	Good	
Roof strength	Good	
Head restraints and seats	Good	
Headlights (varies by trim/option)	Good	Poor
Front crash prevention: vehicle-to-vehicle	Superior	
Front crash prevention: vehicle-to-pedestrian (Day)	Superior	

=== ANCAP ===
ANCAP test results Kia EV6 all variants excluding GT (2022, aligned with Euro NCAP)
Test	Points	%
Overall:	5 /5 stars	
Adult occupant:	34.48	90%
Child occupant:	42.96	87%
Pedestrian:	35.08	64%
Safety assist:	14.17	88%

== Sales ==
Calendar year	US	South Korea	Europe	China	Canada	Asia Pacific	Global
2021	0	11,023	8,026	0	0	0	29,482
2022	20,498	24,852	26,658	0	1,470	2,280	83,411
2023	18,879	17,227	36,087	116	2,921	4,454	96,092
2024	21,715	9,054	24,323	157	6,671	2,513	66,446
2025	12,933	9,368	16,218	23	1,191	635	42,948

== See also ==
- Plug-in electric vehicles in India
