= List of BMW concept vehicles =

The following is a list of concept cars and other vehicles, presented by BMW.

Year	Model	Designer	Image
1949	331	Peter Szymanowski	BMW prototype
1949	501	Pininfarina	
1954	528/502	BMW	BMW 502 Sportwagen
1964	Hurricane	BMW	
1967	K67	BMW	
1968	2000 Coupé by Frua	BMW	
1969	2800 Spicup	Bertone	Bertone concept car
1970	2200 TI Garmisch	Bertone	Bertone concept car
1972	1602 Electro-Antrieb (E10)	BMW	
1972	E25 Turbo	Paul Bracq	Bmw turbo concept
1976	Karmann Asso Di Quadri	Italdesign	
1985	Z1 Prototype	BMW	
1990	M8 E31 Prototype	BMW	
1990	Ur-Roadster (Original Roadster)	BMW	
1991	Nazca C2	Italdesign	Italdesign and BMW Prototype
1991	Nazca M12	Italdesign	
1991	Z2	BMW	
1991	E1 (Z11)	BMW	
1992	E2	BMW	
1993	Nazca C2 Spider	Italdesign	
1993	E1 (Z15)	BMW	
1994	Z13	BMW	
1995	Z18	BMW	
1995	Z21	BMW	
1998	Z07	BMW	
1999	Z9	BMW	
2000	Z9 Convertible	BMW	
2000	Z22	BMW	
2000	750hL	BMW	
2001	X-Coupé	Chris Chapman	
2001	Z29	BMW	
2002	CS1	Chris Chapman	
2003	xActivity	Chris Chapman	
2005	Concept Z4 Coupé	Chris Bangle	
2006	Concept Coupé Mille Miglia (2006)	Chris Bangle	
2007	1 Series tii	BMW	
2007	CS	BMW	
2007	Concept X6	BMW	
2007	Concept X6 ActiveHybrid	BMW	
2008	Concept X1	BMW	
2008	BMW Concept 7 Series ActiveHybrid	BMW	
2008	GINA	Chris Bangle	
2008	M1 Homage	BMW	
2009	Vision EfficientDynamics concept	BMW	
2009	5 GT Concept Car	BMW	
2009	C1-E	BMW	
2010	Concept 6 Series	BMW	
2011	Vision ConnectedDrive	BMW	
2011	328 Hommage	BMW	
2011	i3 Concept	BMW	
2011	i8 Concept	BMW	
2012	i3 Concept Coupé	BMW	
2012	i8 Concept Spyder	BMW	
2012	Zagato Coupé	Zagato	
2012	Zagato Roadster	Zagato	
2012	Concept Active Tourer	BMW	
2012	Concept 4 Series Coupé	BMW	
2013	BMW Concept Active Tourer Outdoor	BMW	
2013	Concept X5 eDrive	BMW	
2013	BMW Concept X4	BMW	
2013	Gran Lusso Coupé	BMW	
2013	Concept M4 Coupé	BMW	
2014	Vision Future Luxury (7 series 2019)	BMW	
2015	M4 Concept Iconic Lights	BMW	
2015	3.0 CSL Hommage	BMW	
2015	3.0 CSL Hommage R	BMW	
2015	BMW 5 Series Gran Turismo with fuel-cell	BMW	
2015	Concept Compact Sedan	BMW	
2016	i Vision Future Interaction	BMW	
2016	Vision Next 100	BMW	
2016	2002 Hommage Concept	BMW	
2016	2002 Hommage Turbomeister Concept	BMW	
2016	Motorrad Vision Next 100	BMW	
2016	Concept X2	BMW	
2017	Concept 8 Series	BMW	
2017	Motorrad Concept Link	BMW	
2017	Concept Z4	BMW	
2017	i Vision Dynamics	BMW	
2017	Concept X7 iPerformance	BMW	
2018	Concept M8 Gran Coupé	BMW	
2018	Concept iX3	BMW	
2018	Vision iNEXT	BMW	
2019	Concept 4	BMW	
2019	i Hydrogen Next (fuel cell)	BMW	
2019	Vision M Next	BMW	
2020	Concept i4	BMW	
2021	I Vision Circular	BMW	
2021	XM Concept	BMW	
2022	iX Flow Concept	BMW	
2023	i Vision Dee	BMW	
2023	Vision Neue Klasse	BMW	
2024	Vision Neue Klasse X	BMW	
2024	Concept Skytop	BMW	
2025	Concept Speedtop	BMW	
2026	Vision BMW ALPINA	BMW	
2026	M Concept Neue Klasse	BMW	
