= Z18 =

Z18 may refer to:

- BMW Z18, concept car
- Changhe Z-18, medium transport helicopter developed by Changhe Aircraft Industries Corporation (CAIC) to replace the Z-8
- German destroyer Z18 Hans Lüdemann, Type 1936-class destroyer built for the Kriegsmarine in the late 1930s
- Haplogroup R-Z18, a Germanic haplogroup that includes all men who have the Z18 mutation in their Y chromosome
- New South Wales Z18 class locomotive (formally R.285 class) was a class of 0-6-0T steam locomotive built for the New South Wales Government Railways of Australia
- Nissan Z18, a 1.8 L (1,770 cc) straight-four engine with SOHC and eight valves
- Z18 small nucleolar RNA (also known as SNORD74 and U74) is a non-coding RNA (ncRNA) molecule which functions in the modification of other small nuclear RNAs (snRNAs)
- Zbrojovka Z 18, a Czechoslovak car of the 1920s
