= BMW Vision Alpina =

Car model

Overview
- Manufacturer: BMW Alpina
- Production: 2026
- Designer: Maximilian Missoni

Body and chassis
- Class: Concept car
- Body style: 2-door coupe

The BMW Vision Alpina is a concept car developed by BMW under the BMW Alpina brand. It was presented as a one-of-one design study previewing the future direction of the BMW Alpina brand.

== History ==
BMW's chief designer, Adrian van Hooydonk, unveiled the Vision Alpina at the Concorso d'Eleganza Villa d'Este in 2026. The vehicle was designed by former Polestar designer Maximilian Missoni, who since September 2024, has been responsible for BMW's luxury and Alpina design.

== Specifications ==
The Vision Alpina is a 5.20-meter-long, four-seater coupé and has a V8 gasoline engine. The front features a large BMW kidney grille, but also evokes the "shark nose" design of older BMW models. A warm white color was chosen for the daytime running lights. The Vision Alpina has a panoramic roof, and the C-pillar features the Hofmeister kink. The Alpina-typical decorative stripes are coated with clear lacquer. The multi-spoke wheels with 20 spokes are 22 inches in diameter at the front and 23 inches at the rear. The rounded rear end features two oval exhaust tailpipes on each side. BMW did not provide further details about the engine.

The interior is finished in two-tone leather with subtle blue and green accents. The front features BMW's Panoramic iDrive system and a slanted passenger-side screen with a special user interface for Alpina; precisely cut crystal elements are also incorporated. The rear seats are individual units.
