= BMW Vision ConnectedDrive =

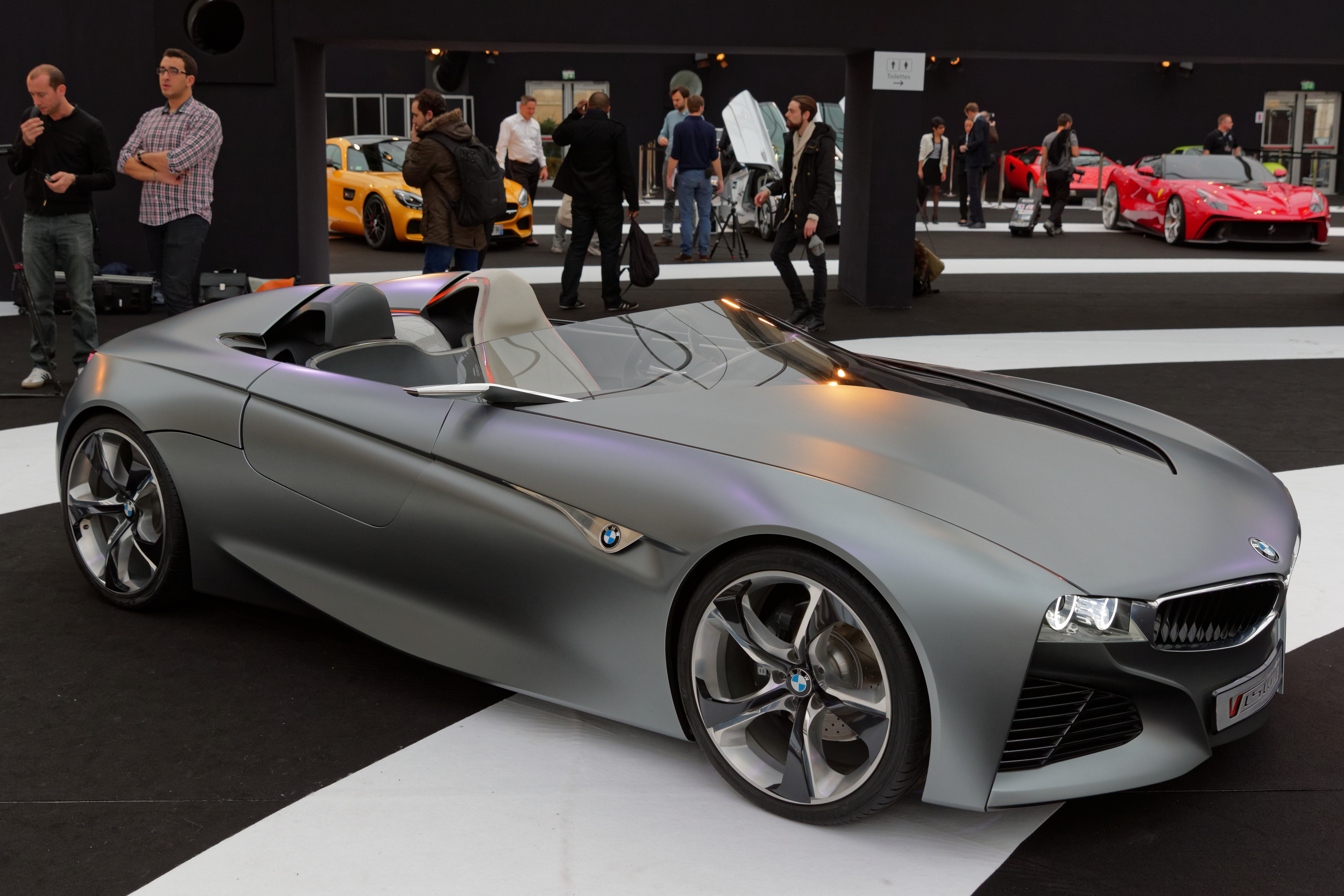

Overview
- Manufacturer: BMW
- Production: Concept car only
- Designer: Juliane Blasi

Body and chassis
- Class: concept
- Body style: 2-door sports car

Powertrain
- Engine: Electric

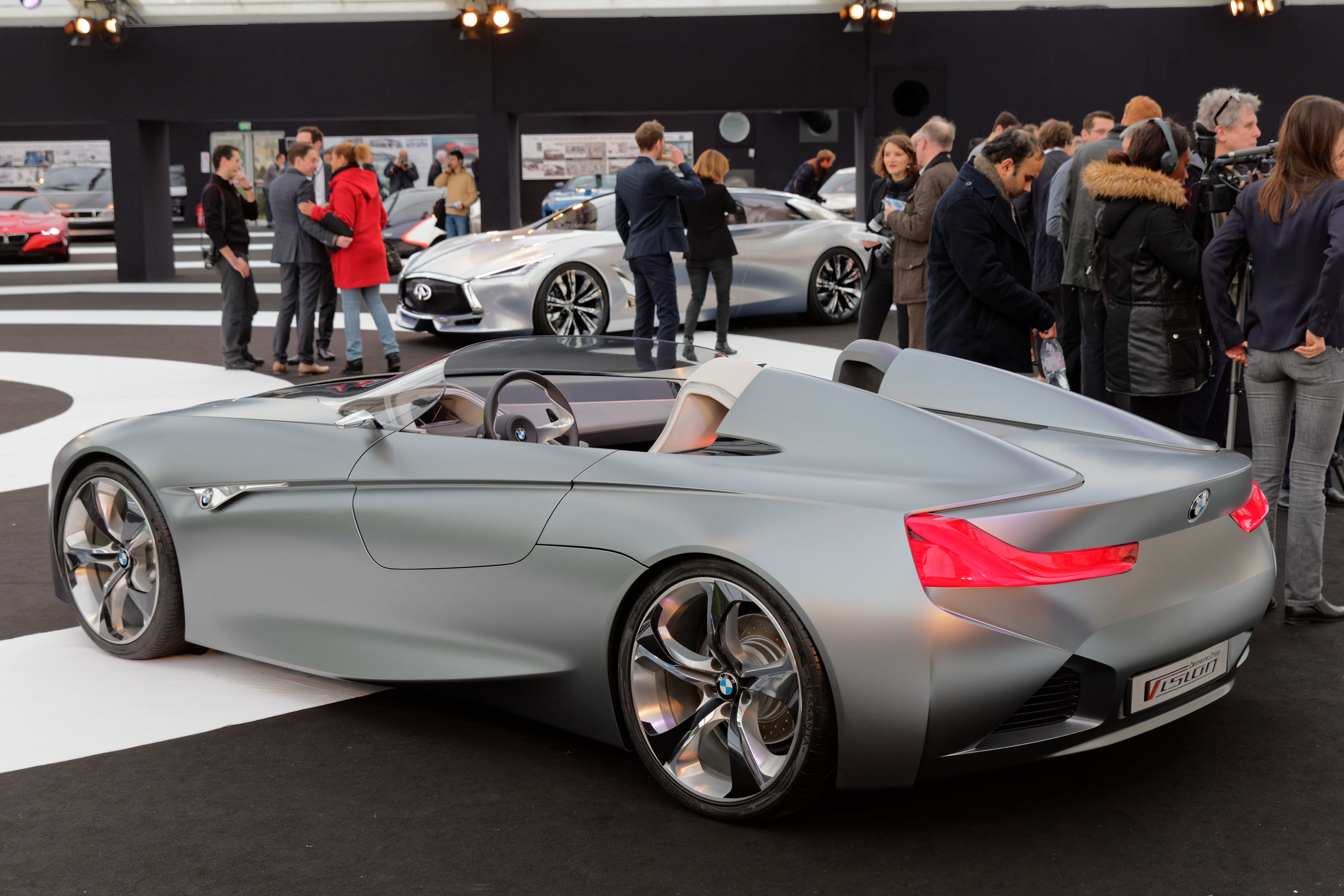
Rear view

The Vision ConnectedDrive is a two-seater sports car concept built by BMW featuring new advanced driver assistance aids. It had its world premiere at the 2011 Geneva Motor Show. Unlike previously named Vision concept cars, BMW has no intention to build this vehicle, but to show off its latest design and technology developments.

== Exterior ==
Unlike the 2008 BMW GINA fabric skinned concept, the ConnectedDrive features more traditional materials, but in an equally modern design, referred to by BMW's head of design Adrian van Hooydonk as a 'layered surface'. The front grille maintains the BMW style grille, and the front and rear lighting monitor the surrounding traffic conditions around the car. The doors are a variation of the 1989 BMW Z1, with the outer skins slide forward and the inner door slides backwards. The use of unconventional lighting is integrated into the overall design, from the bonnet area and around the seats to the rear boot lid.

== Interior ==
The interior is very much driver orientated, with a high centre console dividing the interior into two, and using differing lighting schemes to change the internal and external character of the car. The passenger has their own display unit directly in front of them, and the driver has a 3D head-up display screen which overlays actual sat nav information onto the view in front.

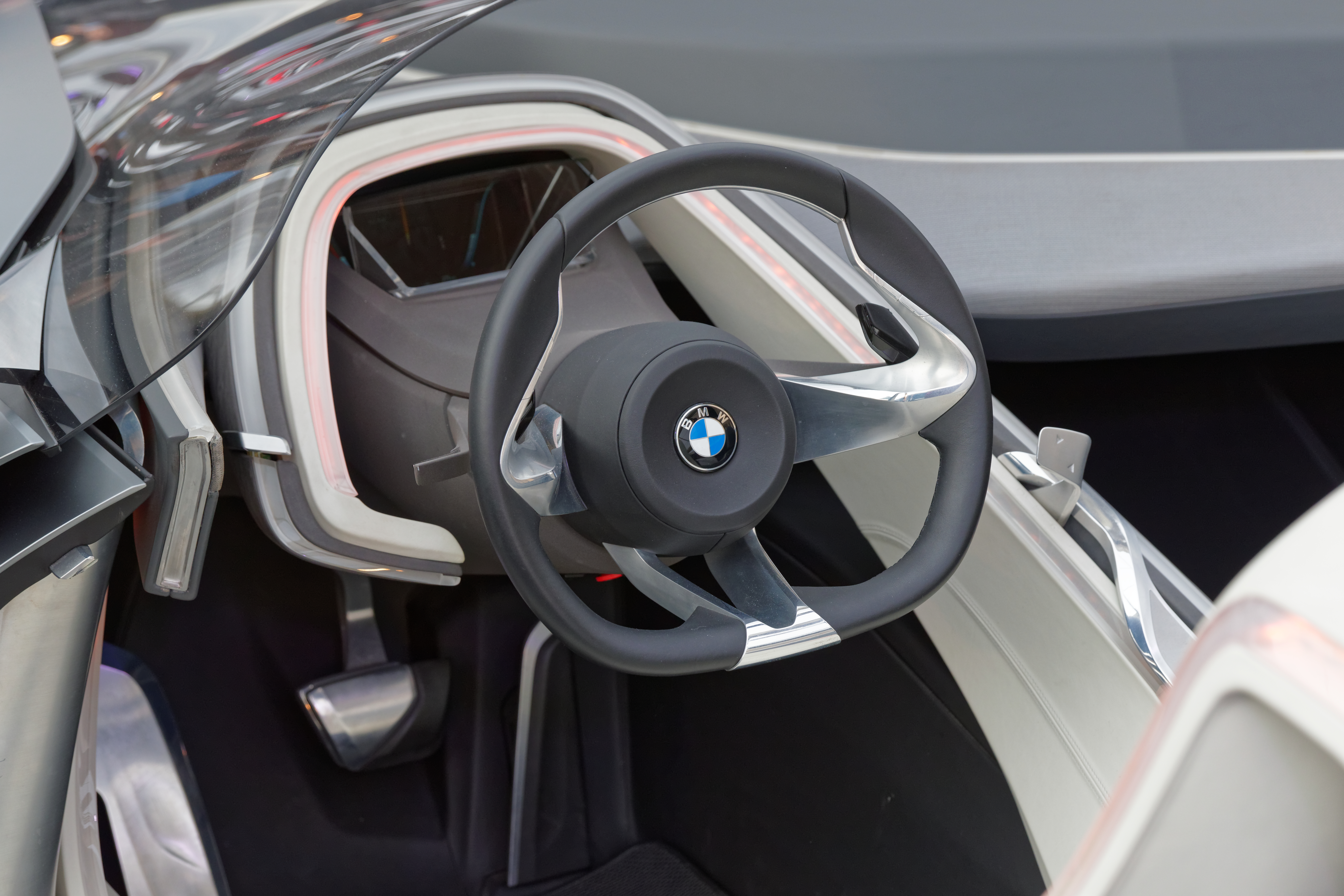
Interior
