= BMW Skytop =

Limited production sports car

Overview
- Manufacturer: BMW
- Production: 2025
- Assembly: Germany: Dingolfing (Plant Dingolfing)
- Designer: Marcus Syring under Đomagoj Dukec, Adrian van Hooydonk

Body and chassis
- Class: Sports car (S)
- Body style: 2-door Targa top roadster
- Platform: BMW CLAR platform
- Related: BMW 8 Series (G15)

Powertrain
- Engine: 4.4 L S63 TT V8

Dimensions
- Wheelbase: 2,822 mm (111.1 in)

The BMW Skytop is a two-door, two-seater limited production sports car built by BMW, based on the G15 8 Series. It was first shown as the BMW Concept Skytop.

== History ==
The car was first unveiled on 20 May 2024 at the 2024 Villa d'Este Concorso d'Eleganza as the BMW Concept Skytop. On 12 October 2024, BMW announced that it will start a limited production run of the BMW Skytop of just 50 units. BMW claims that all units have already been sold out. The concept's design, including the slim light units and small door handles, will be unchanged compared to the production model.

Rear view

== Design ==
=== Exterior ===
Adrian van Hooydonk, the BMW Group's head of design, describes the design of the Skytop as "truly unique and exotic", comparing it to the BMW Z8 and 503. The front-end features a shark-nose design, including illuminated kidney grilles and BMW's slimmest production headlights. The rear features similarly thin L-shaped taillights. A spine that runs down the hood is also present on the rear deck lid as an aluminium bar. Instead of traditional door handles, the Skytop uses small winglets that extend from the silver window trim. It is only available in one paint finish - Floating Sundown Silver, which also transitions into the reddish-brown roof color.

The Skytop is categorized as a targa top roadster. Unlike other convertible models from BMW, the Skytop does not have an electronically powered roof. Instead, it is split into two leather pieces, which are manually fitted. A space for storing the roof panels was created by removing the rear seats from the standard 8 Series.

=== Interior ===
The interior of the Skytop remains structurally unchanged from the 8 Series. However, the upholstery color and finishes are specific to the Skytop. This includes leather-trimmed sills, brogue-style perforation, and a crystal gear selector.

== Specifications ==
The Skytop uses the 4.4-liter twin-turbo charged BMW S63B44T4 engine, also used in models such as the F90 M5 and F91/92/93 M8. This variant produces 617 horsepower (460 kW; 626 PS) and uses an eight-speed ZF 8HP76 automatic transmission to power the four-wheel-drive drivetrain. The Skytop accelerates 0–100 km/h (62 mph) in 3.3 seconds.

== BMW Speedtop ==
The BMW Speedtop was revealed as the Concept Speedtop at the 2025 Concorso d’Eleganza Villa d’Este, as a shooting brake variant of the Skytop. As a result, it is also based on the G15 8 Series. Later, it was revealed that BMW will also start a limited production run for the Speedtop, delivering all 70 units by late 2026.

The Speedtop features a unique paint scheme featuring Floating Sunstone Maroon as the main color, transitioning to Floating Sundown Silver at the end of the roof. It also uses exclusive 14-spoke two-tone wheels.

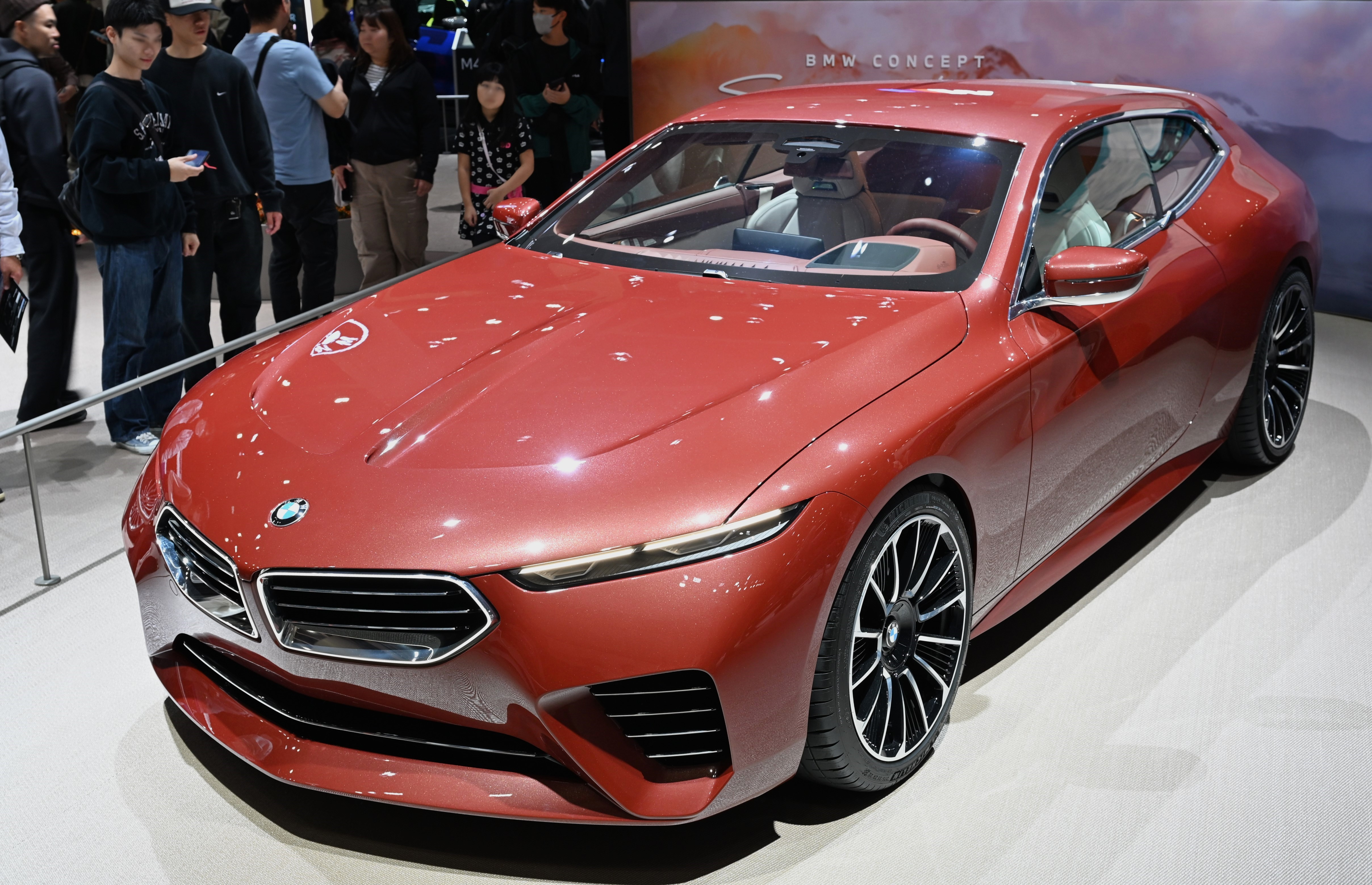
BMW Speedtop

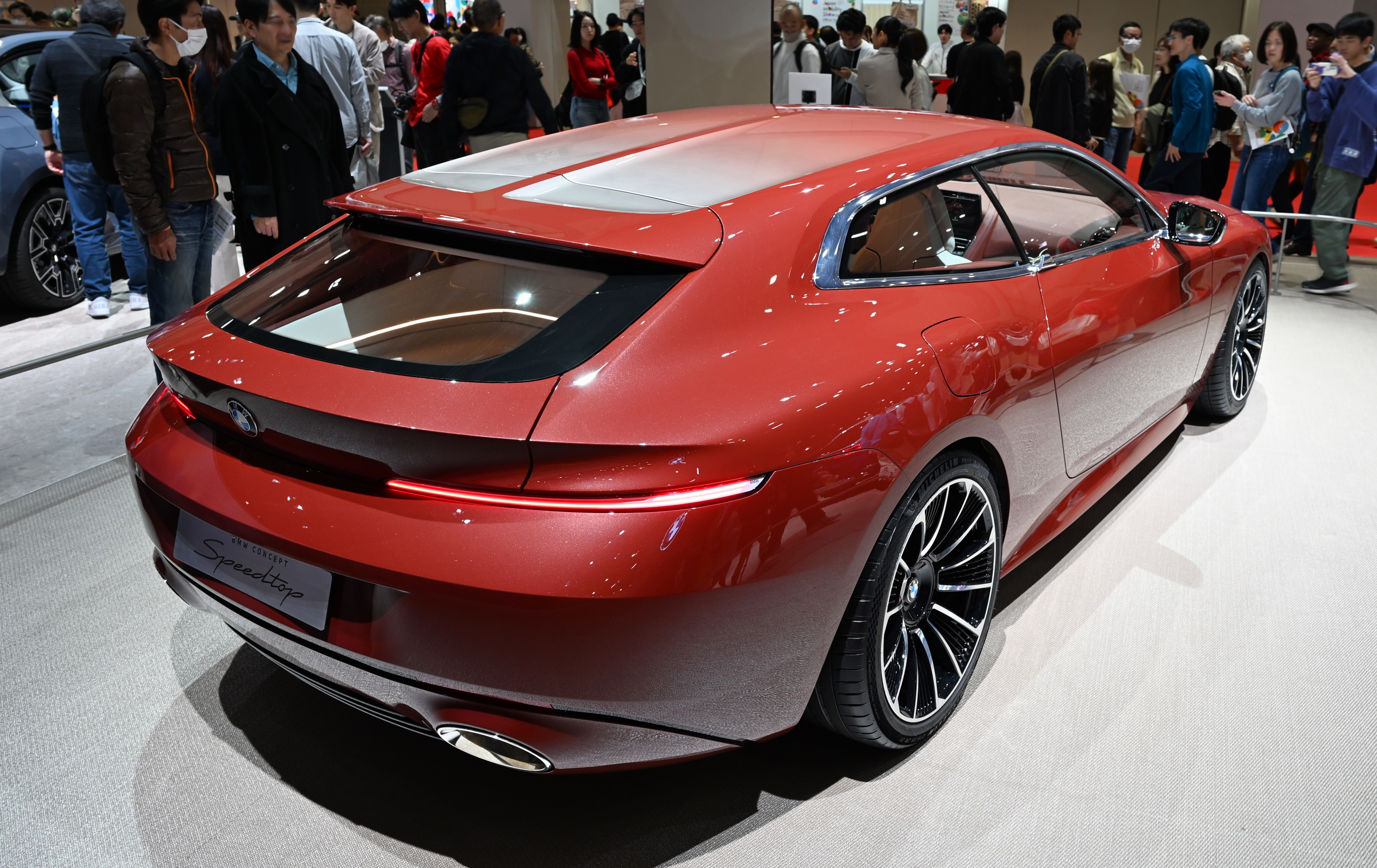
Rear view
