= BMW X-Coupe =

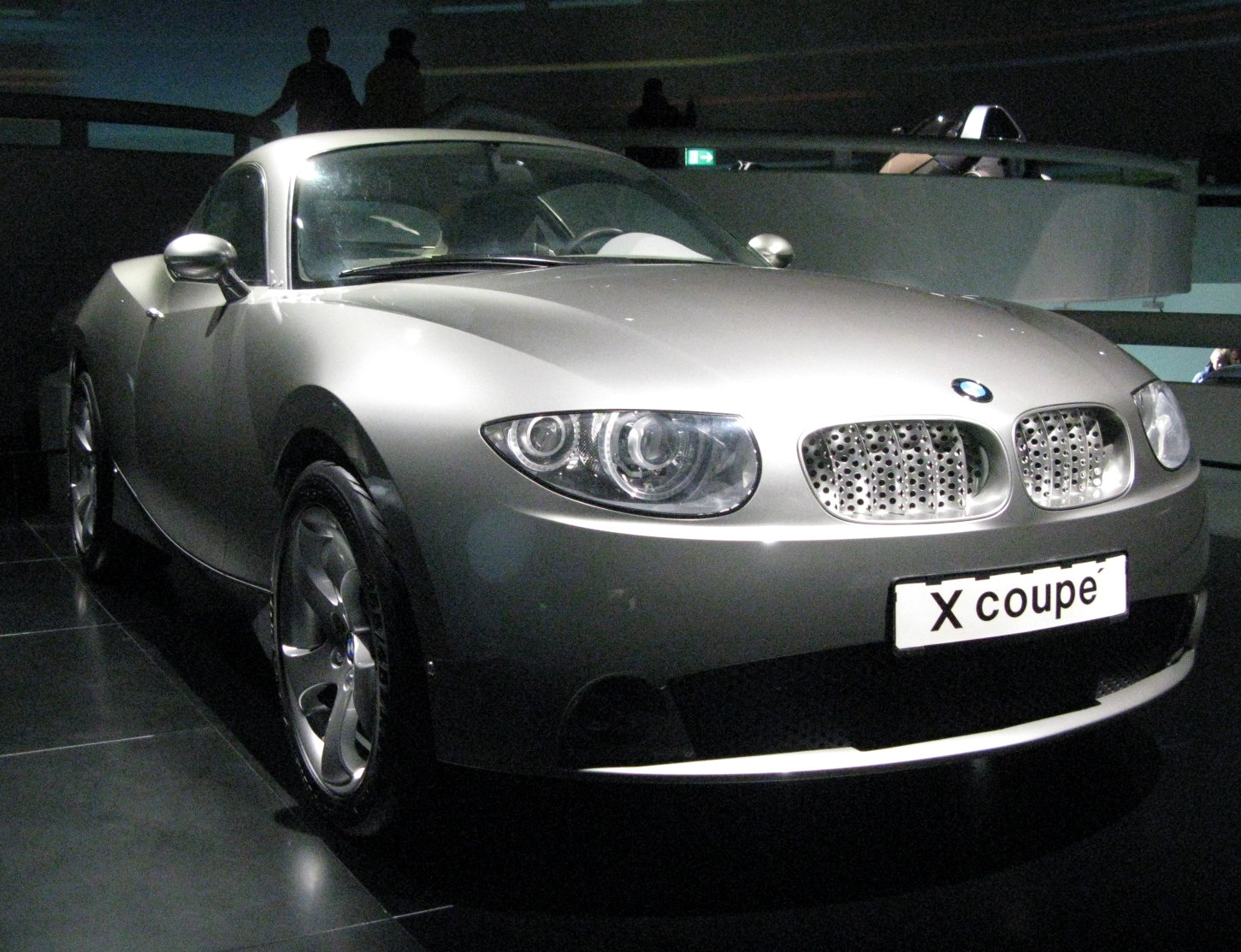

Overview
- Manufacturer: BMW
- Production: 2001
- Designer: Chris Bangle

Body and chassis
- Class: Concept crossover coupe
- Body style: 2-door crossover coupe
- Related: BMW X5 (E53)

Powertrain
- Engine: 3.0l Turbo-diesel

Chronology
- Successor: BMW Z4 Coupe; BMW Z4 M Coupe

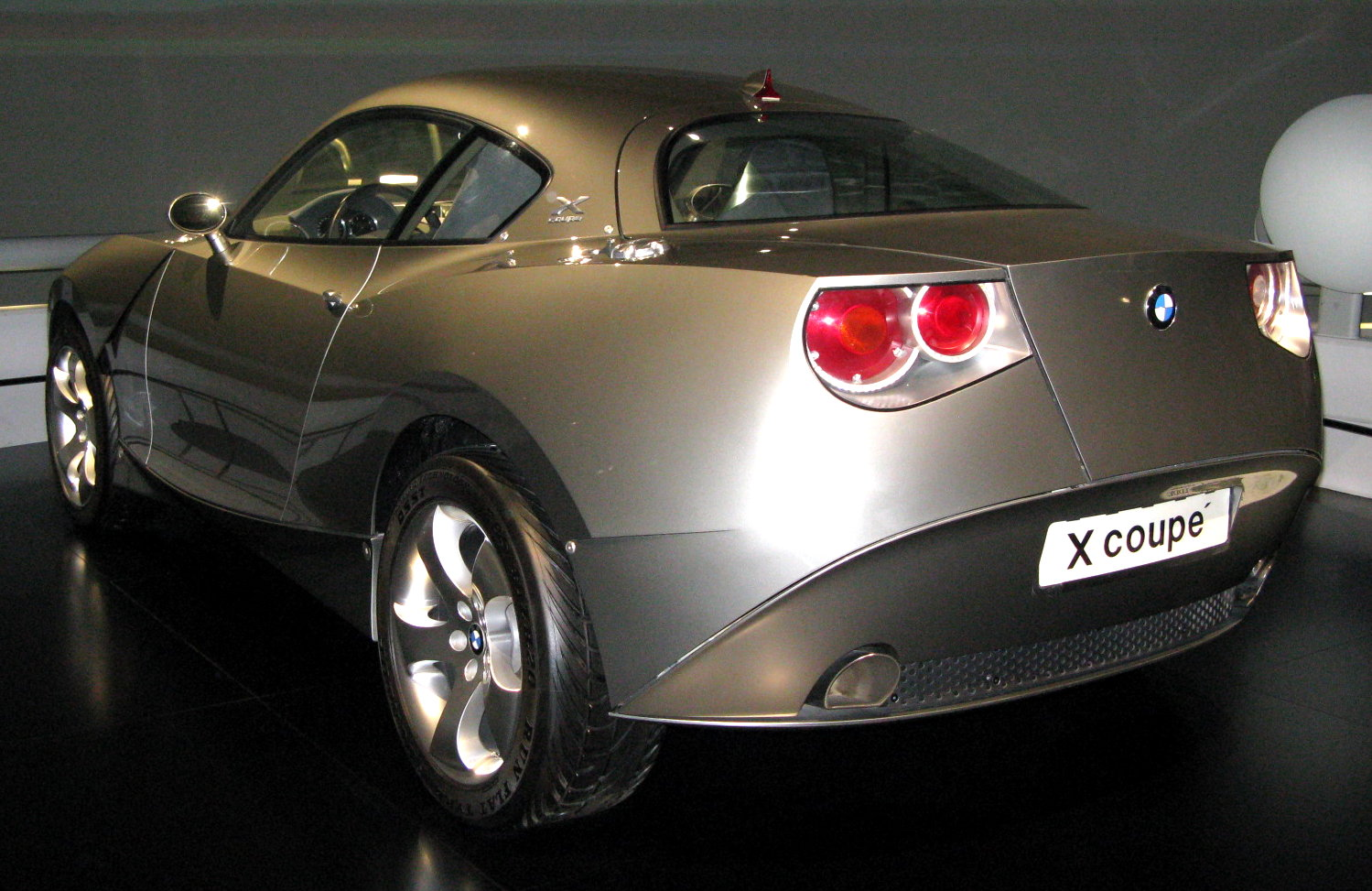
Rear view

The X-Coupe was a concept crossover coupe designed by Chris Bangle for BMW, debuting at the 2001 North American International Auto Show in Detroit. Based upon the BMW X5 chassis, the X-Coupe featured an aluminium body and a 3.0 litre turbo-diesel engine. Unlike the BMW X5, the X-Coupe had an aluminium body, a trunk opening downwards and two doors that swing outward.
