= BMW i Vision Circular =

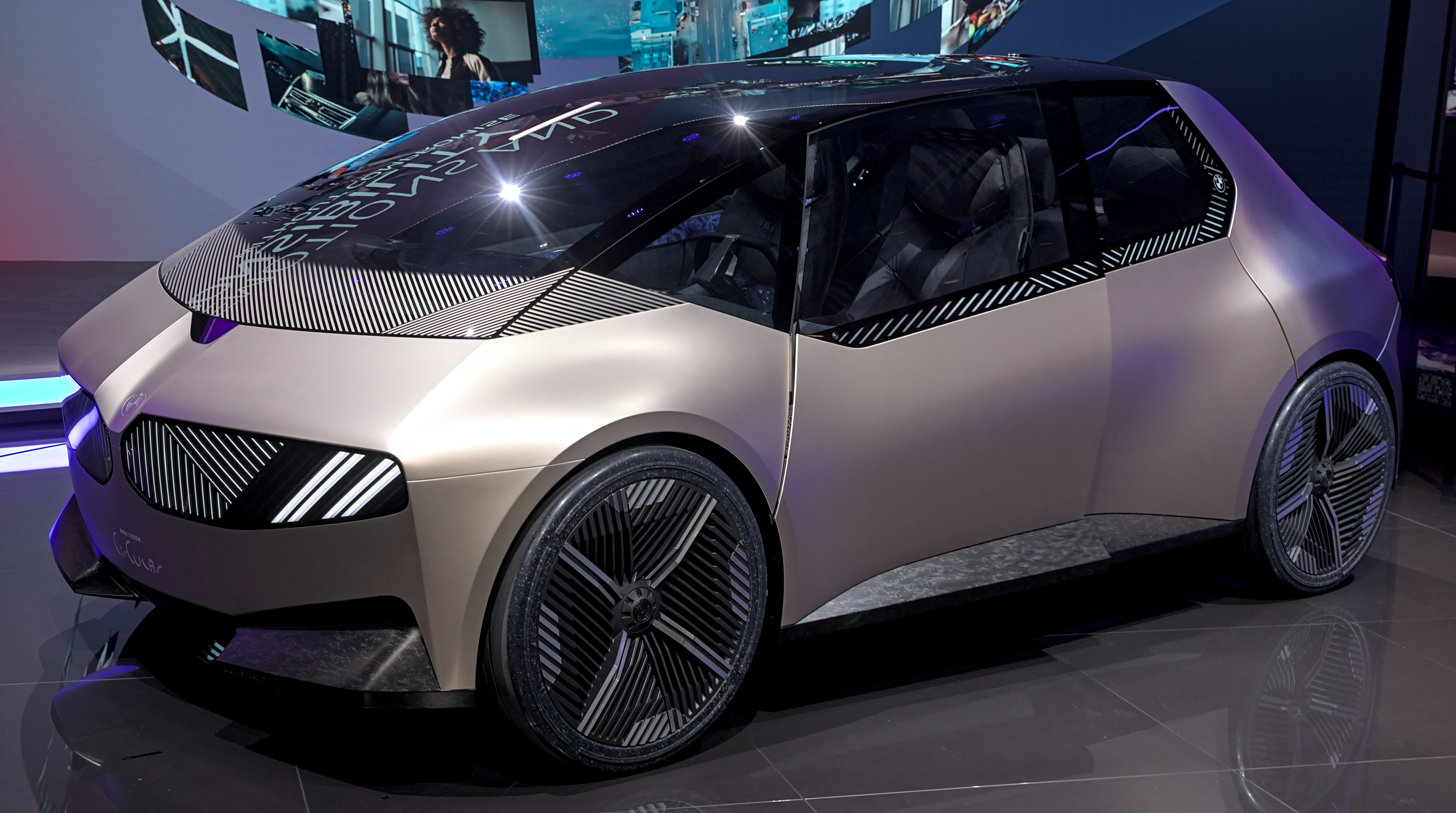

Overview
- Manufacturer: BMW
- Production: 2021
- Designer: Sawyer Li (Lead Exterior Designer); Chris Lee, Erik Melldahl (Interior Designer)

Body and chassis
- Class: Concept car
- Body style: 5-door hatchback

The BMW i Vision Circular is a concept car produced by German automaker BMW and introduced to the public at the IAA exhibition in 2021.

== Design ==
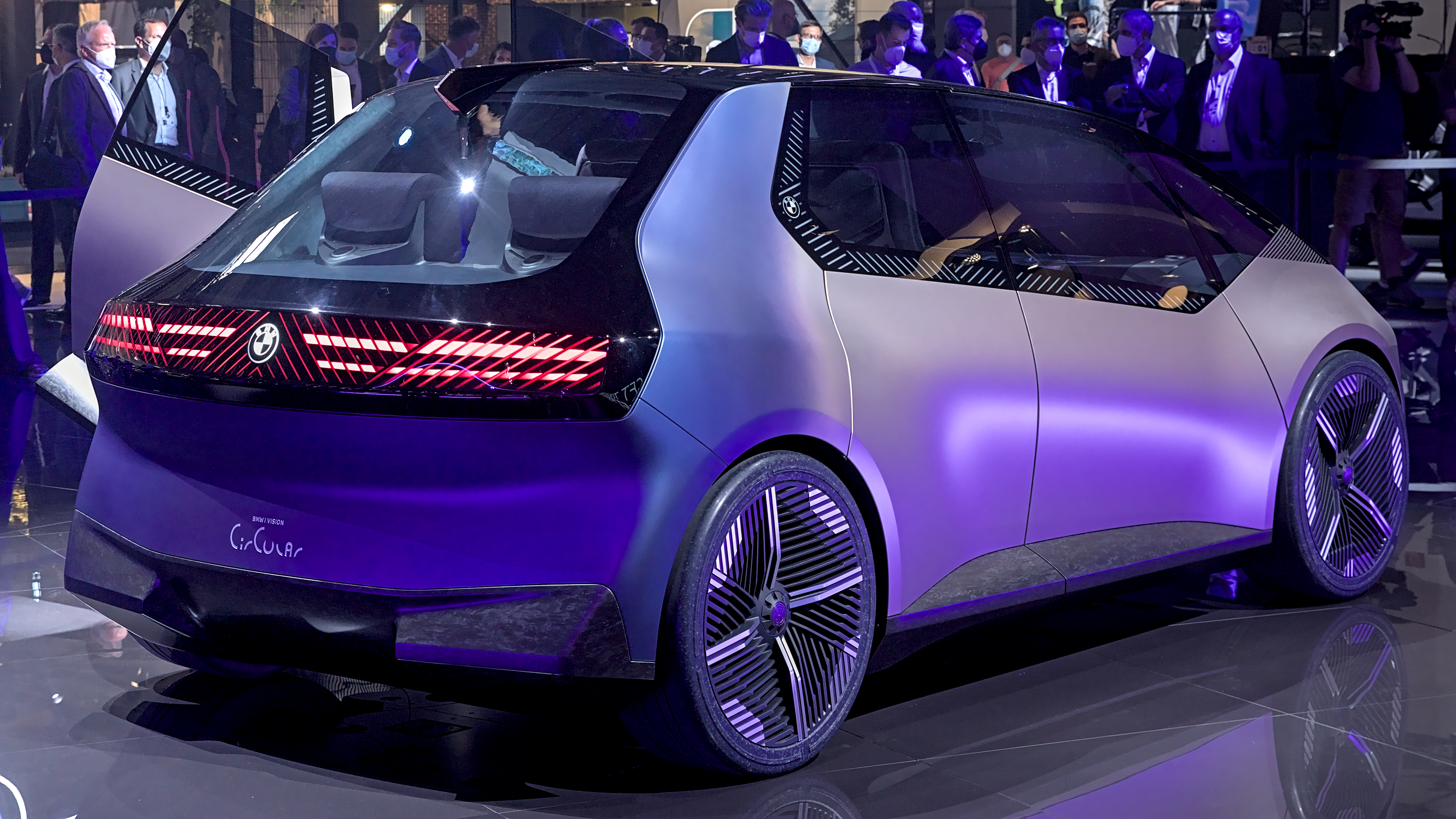
Rear view

BMW says the i Vision Circular was created to envision what an all-electric compact luxury model from the brand could look like in 2040. The concept's main priority was to be built using 100% recyclable and 100% recycled materials, including a solid-state electric battery. BMW claims to have achieved the 100% recyclability goal and states that the concept is close to using entirely recycled materials. The body of the I Vision Circular is made from a mixture of recycled aluminum, steel and plastic, with the aluminum anodized gold instead of paint, and the steel receiving heat treatment to make it blue. The exterior also features a single piece of glass for the windshield and roof, rear-hinged rear doors, digital graphics on the BMW kidney grilles, which double as the headlights, and similar graphics running along the bottom of the windows, which BMW say could be used to display vehicle information to people outside the car. Kai Langer, head of design at BMW's electric car division, BMW i, emphasized the sustainability of the design, and said the concept was designed with minimalism in mind, noting design decisions such as how the kidney grilles and headlights are combined, while also pointing out traditional BMW design elements such as the Hofmeister kink.

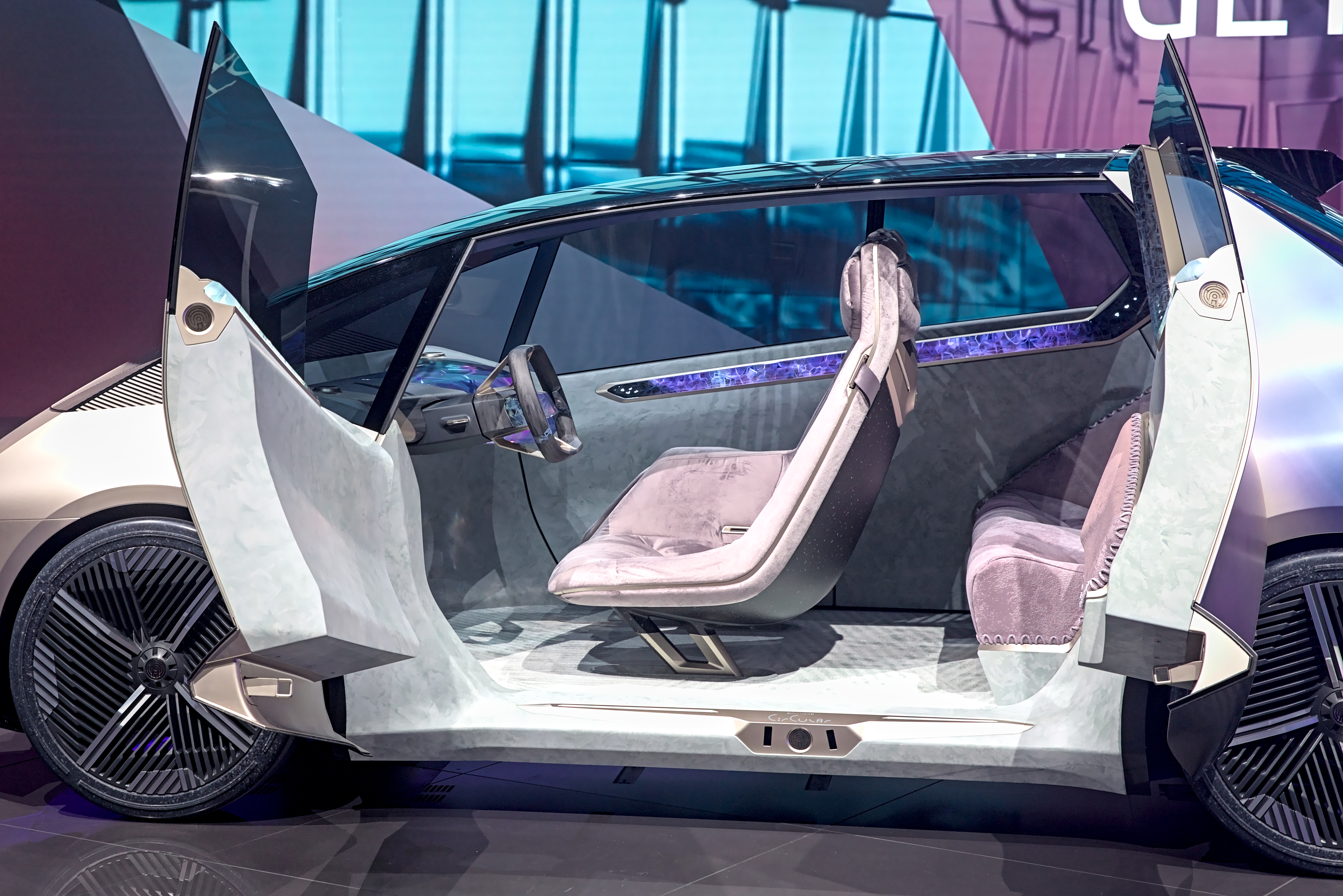
View of the interior with the doors open

The interior features seating for four and incorporates many of the same materials as the exterior, along with recycled fabric. The steering wheel and dashboard are 3D-printed using wood powder and illuminated crystal materials. To improve recyclability, the concept uses various quick-release fasteners and cords instead of traditional bonded connections, glue, or composite materials, making disassembly easier. Additional sustainable elements include laser-etched badges and tires made from sustainably cultivated natural rubber.
