= BMW M Concept Neue Klasse =

- BMW M Concept Neue Klasse

Overview
- Manufacturer: BMW
- Designer: Michael Scully

Body and chassis
- Class: Compact executive car (D)
- Body style: 4-door sedan
- Platform: Neue Klasse platform

The BMW M Concept Neue Klasse is a concept car developed by BMW. It was presented at the 2026 24 Hours of Le Mans on 12 June 2026, previewing the upcoming BMW M3 (ZA0) as well as future Neue Klasse M models.

== Overview ==
The M Concept Neue Klasse mainly previews the NA0 i3-based ZA0 M3, the first dedicated M model in the Neue Klasse generation. BMW claims that “elements of the concept, including design, materials, driving experience and brand interpretation, will be incorporated into future BMW M vehicles”.

Compared to the i3, its exterior expands on the design language predominantly through redesigned front and rear fascias and flared fenders. It was painted in Monza Red. In the front, a trimaran-style bumper inspired by high-speed sailing boats is used with split lower intakes, while the face has been given a significant slant to evoke the "shark nose" commonly used in BMW models. New design elements include yellow two-line DRLs in the front and new Track Lights in the front and rear, which consists of four three-dimensional cubic lighting elements at the sides of the bumpers. BMW intends to apply them onto upcoming M road cars. Furthermore, a host of natural fiber elements have been used in the front splitter, floating diffuser, and the functional V-shaped hood vent. According to Michael Scully, the head of BMW M Design, the natural fiber composite was chosen as it allows for very similar strength and stiffness compared to carbon fiber while generating approximately 40% fewer emissions. Center-lock wheels are used with the 3 M colors and negative camber, while the M-specific architecture further lowers the car's stance.

The interior also employs elements from recent Neue Klasse models. Most significantly, the dashboard features the 43.3-inch Panoramic Vision Display recessed at the base of the windshield and a hexagonal 7.9-inch central display, both powered by BMW's iDrive X operating system. There are four individual bucket seats with red five-point harnesses, upholstered in Bathurst Blue and Berry Red Merino leather. Furthermore, black knit fabric is also extensively used.

The M Concept Neue Klasse is based on an M-specific variant of BMW's 800-volt Neue Klasse platform, featuring a quad-motor drivetrain and a dedicated M Dynamic Performance Control System as part of the Heart of Joy computer. A battery pack of over 100 kWh is used.
