= BMW Z18 =

1990 concept car by BMW

Overview
- Manufacturer: BMW
- Production: 1990
- Designer: BMW Technik GmbH

Body and chassis
- Class: Concept car
- Body style: 2-door roadster, 2-door pickup
- Layout: Front-engine, four-wheel-drive
- Related: BMW Z3, BMW X5

Powertrain
- Engine: 4.4 L (268.5 cu in) BMW M62 naturally aspirated V8
- Transmission: 5-speed manual transmission

Dimensions
- Length: 4,250 mm (167.3 in)
- Kerb weight: 1,560 kg (3,439 lb)

The BMW Z18 is a concept car developed by BMW Technik GmbH, the former think tank of BMW. Unveiled in 1995, the Z18 combined elements of the BMW Z3 with those of an off-road vehicle, creating what BMW described as the first "off-road roadster."

== Background ==
BMW Technik GmbH, founded by BMW in 1985, was an independent think tank created to develop innovative vehicle concepts featuring radical interior and exterior design elements. Some of its projects included the BMW E1, an early example of a hybrid electric car. Former Aston Martin chief executive officer Ulrich Bez was the first head of the think tank, under whose leadership the Z18 was developed.

The Technik division has since been reintegrated into BMW as part of its research and development department. Although the Z18 was first developed in 1990, it was not unveiled until 1995.

== Design ==
The car featured styling cues characteristic of 1990s BMWs, including the signature kidney grille, and was based on the BMW Z3. The concept behind the Z18 was to merge elements of an enduro motorcycle, an off-road vehicle, and a roadster, the first of which saw a rise in popularity during the 1990s. While the Z18 retained the general body shape of the Z3, it had a significantly higher ride height to enhance its off-road capabilities. The Z18's plastic body, mounted on a steel frame, was structurally similar to that of a boat, contributing to its weight of 1,560 kg (3,439 lb). Due to its increased ride height, BMW claimed that the Z18 could navigate shallow water passages with ease.

BMW did not design a roof for the Z18, as it was conceived as a roadster. To accommodate the possibility of water entering the cabin, BMW reduced the number of components on the dashboard and waterproofed all interior elements. Additionally, the car was equipped with rubber floor mats. The Z18 also featured collapsible rear seats that could be raised to convert it into a four-seater (2+2) and included an option to transform it into a pickup truck.

The Z18 was powered by the 4.4 L (268.5 cu in) BMW M62 V8 engine, which later found its way into the first-generation X5. The engine produced 355 PS (350 hp; 261 kW), sending power to all four wheels via a 5-speed manual transmission and a four-wheel drive system—both of which were later inherited by the X5.
