= BMW Z =

Series of sports car models produced by BMW

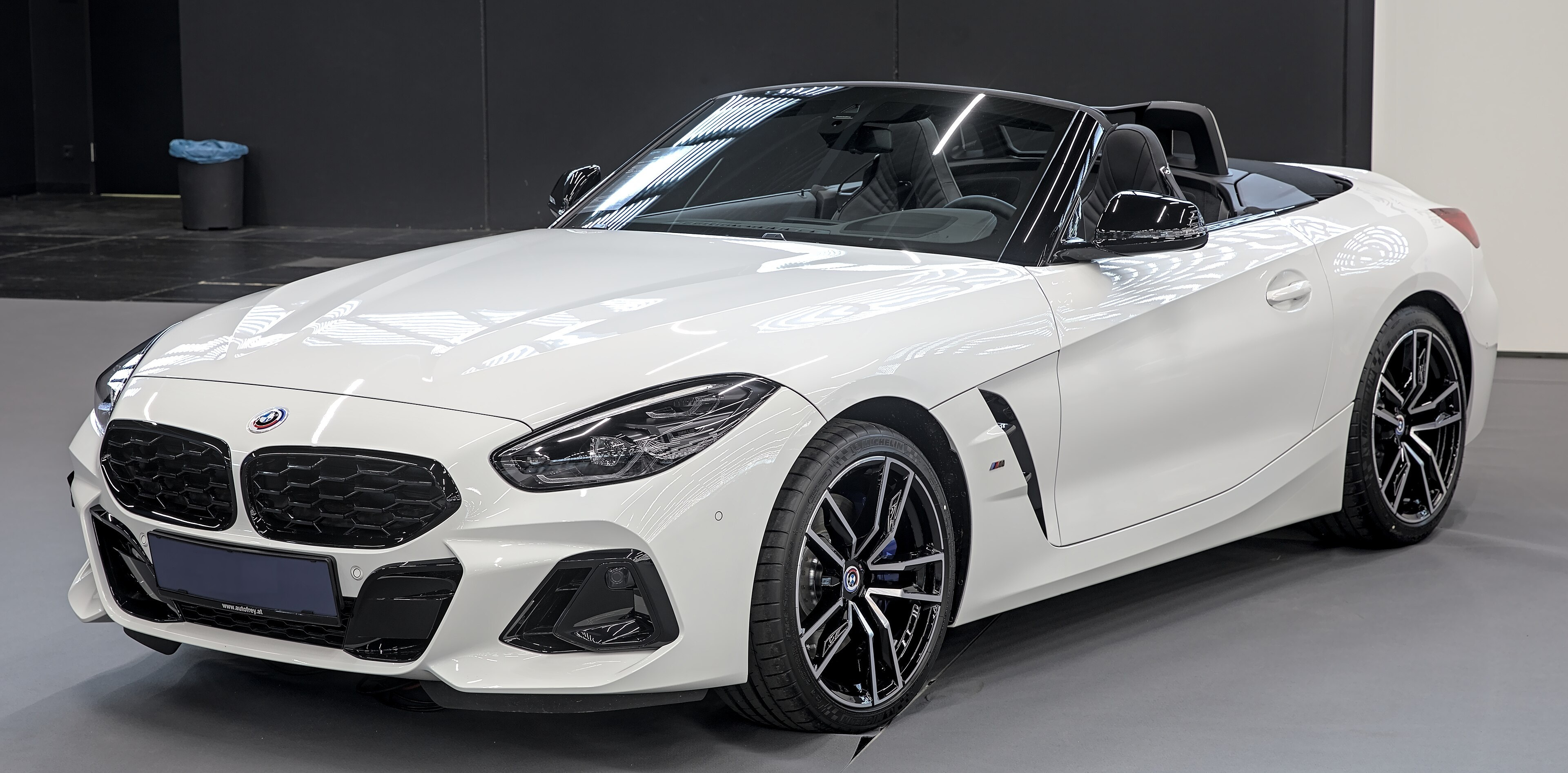
- 2023 BMW Z4 M40i

Overview
- Production: 1989–1992; 1995–2016; 2018–2026

Body and chassis
- Class: Sports car (S)
- Body style: 2-door roadster; 2-door coupé
- Layout: Rear-wheel drive

The BMW Z models are a line of roadsters manufactured by German automaker BMW. The Z stands for Zukunft (German for future), and has been produced in four different series with six generations consisting of roadster, coupé, sports car, and concept variants.

The introduction of the M Coupé and M Roadster in the Z3 line marked the first of the Z series to have a high-performance BMW M variant. The first generation Z4 also continued to offer M Coupé and M Roadster variants. The G29 Z4 uses BMW's (B58B30) inline-six, and its platform is the basis for the J29 Toyota Supra.

BMW ended production of the Z4 in March 2026.

== BMW Z1 (E30 based; 1989–1991) ==
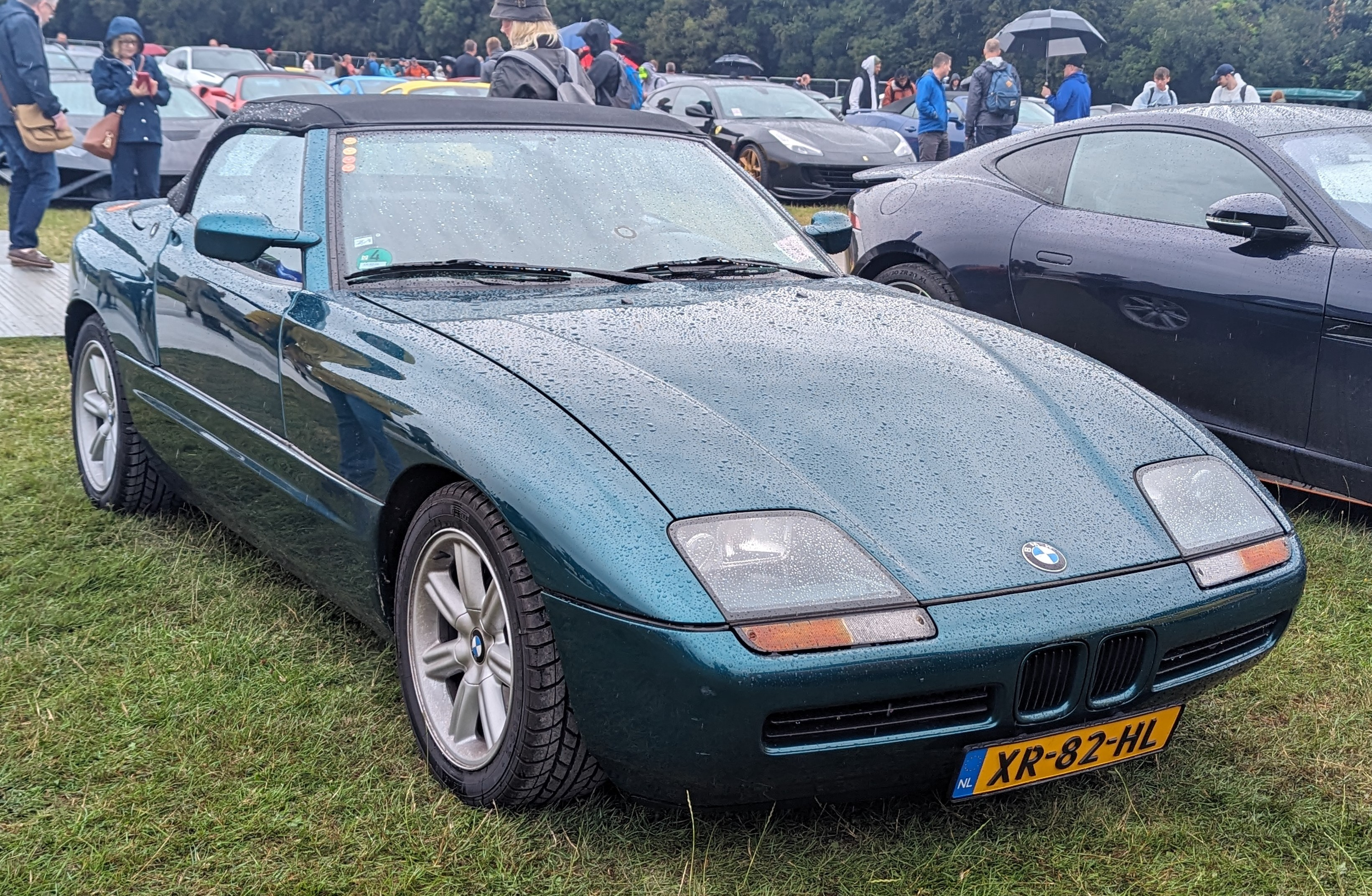
BMW Z1

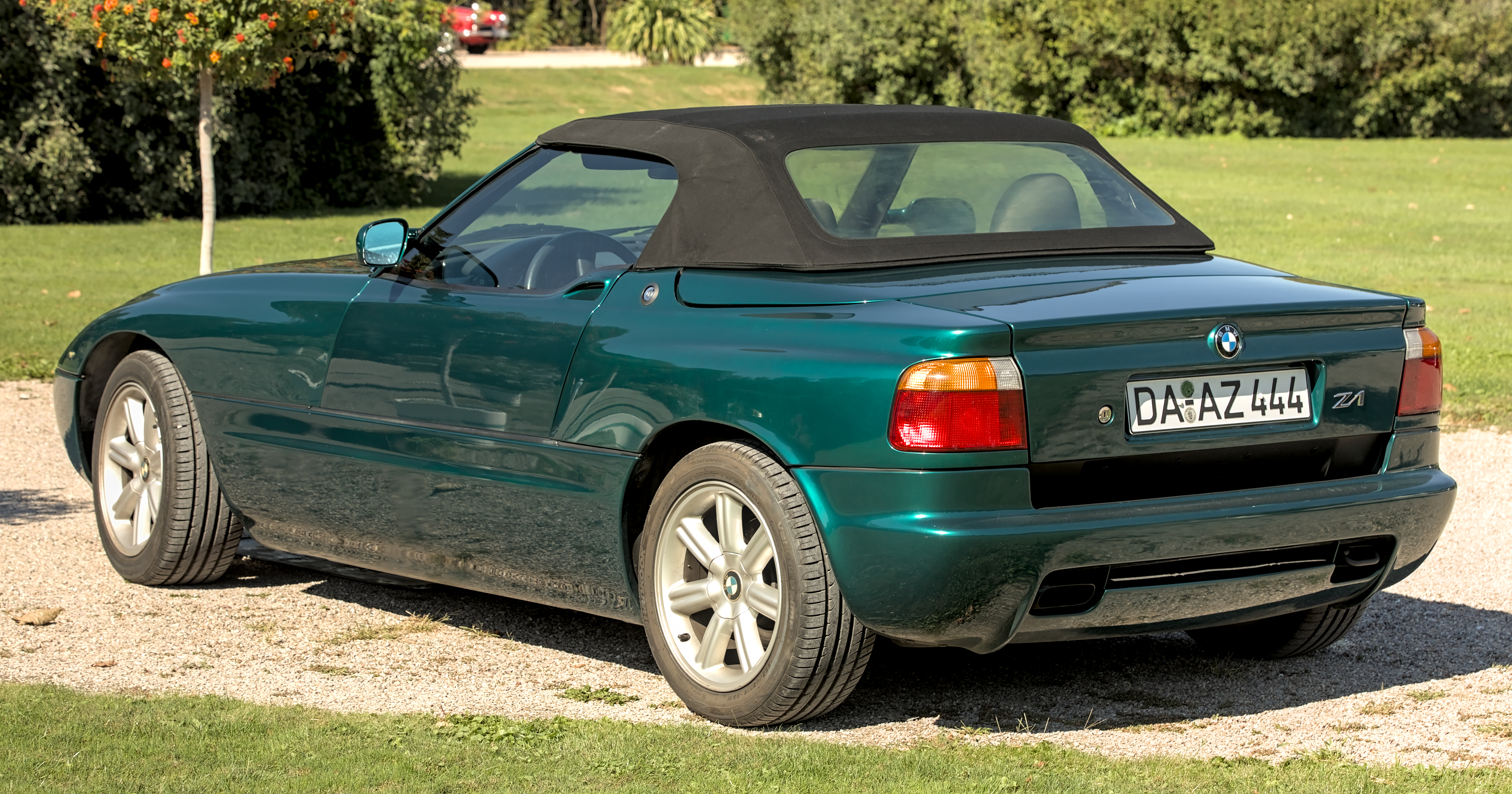
BMW Z1 (rear view)

The BMW Z1 is a two-seat roadster developed by BMW and was produced from March 1989 to June 1991. It was based on the E30 3 Series platform. The Z1 featured unusual doors which, instead of opening outward or upward, dropped into the door sills and had body panels which could easily be removed and replaced; the car could be driven with all its body panels removed for weight reduction and increased performance. Only 8,000 examples of the Z1 were produced.

== BMW Z3 (E36/7/8; 1995–2002) ==
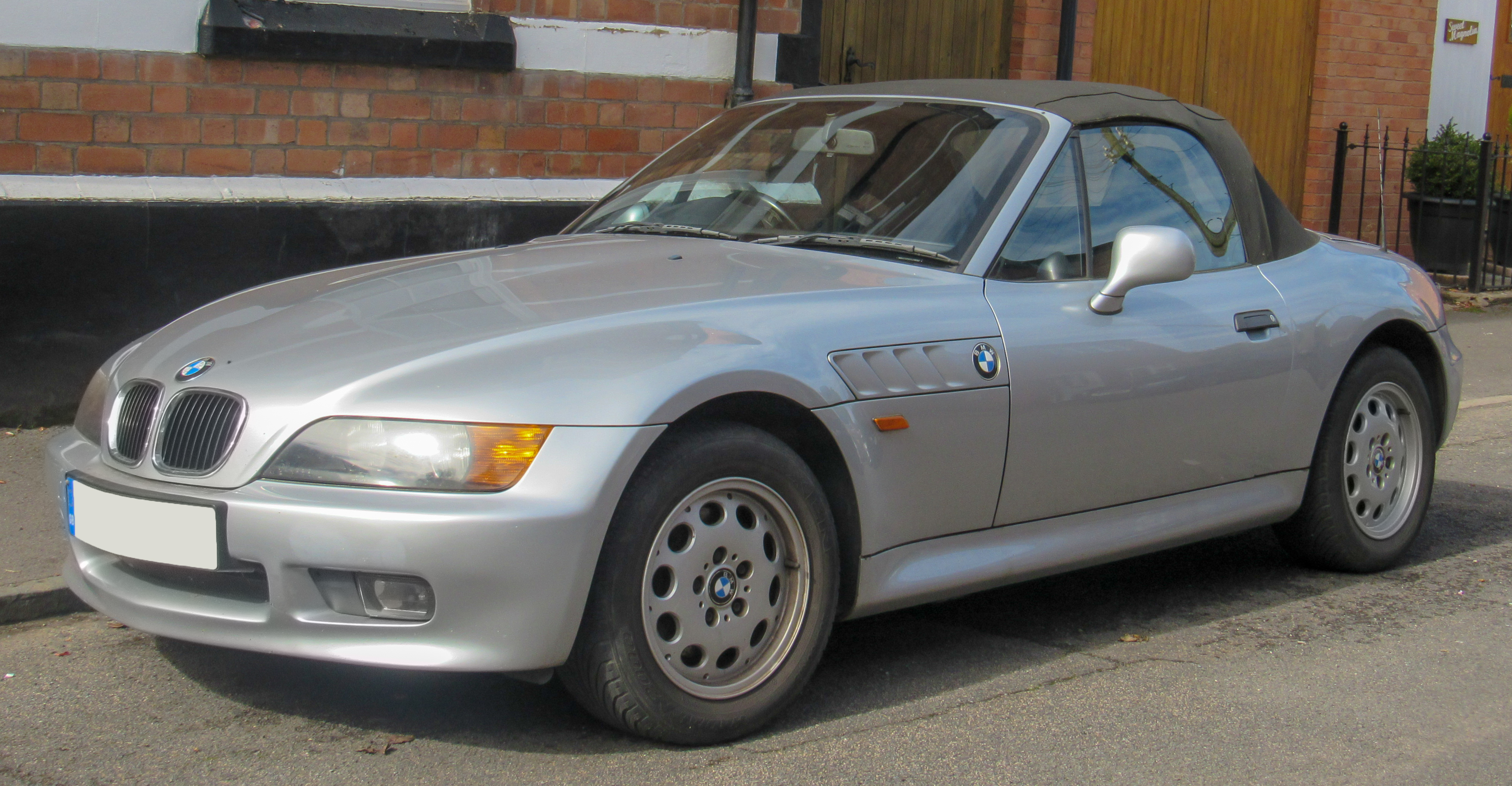
BMW Z3 (pre-facelift)

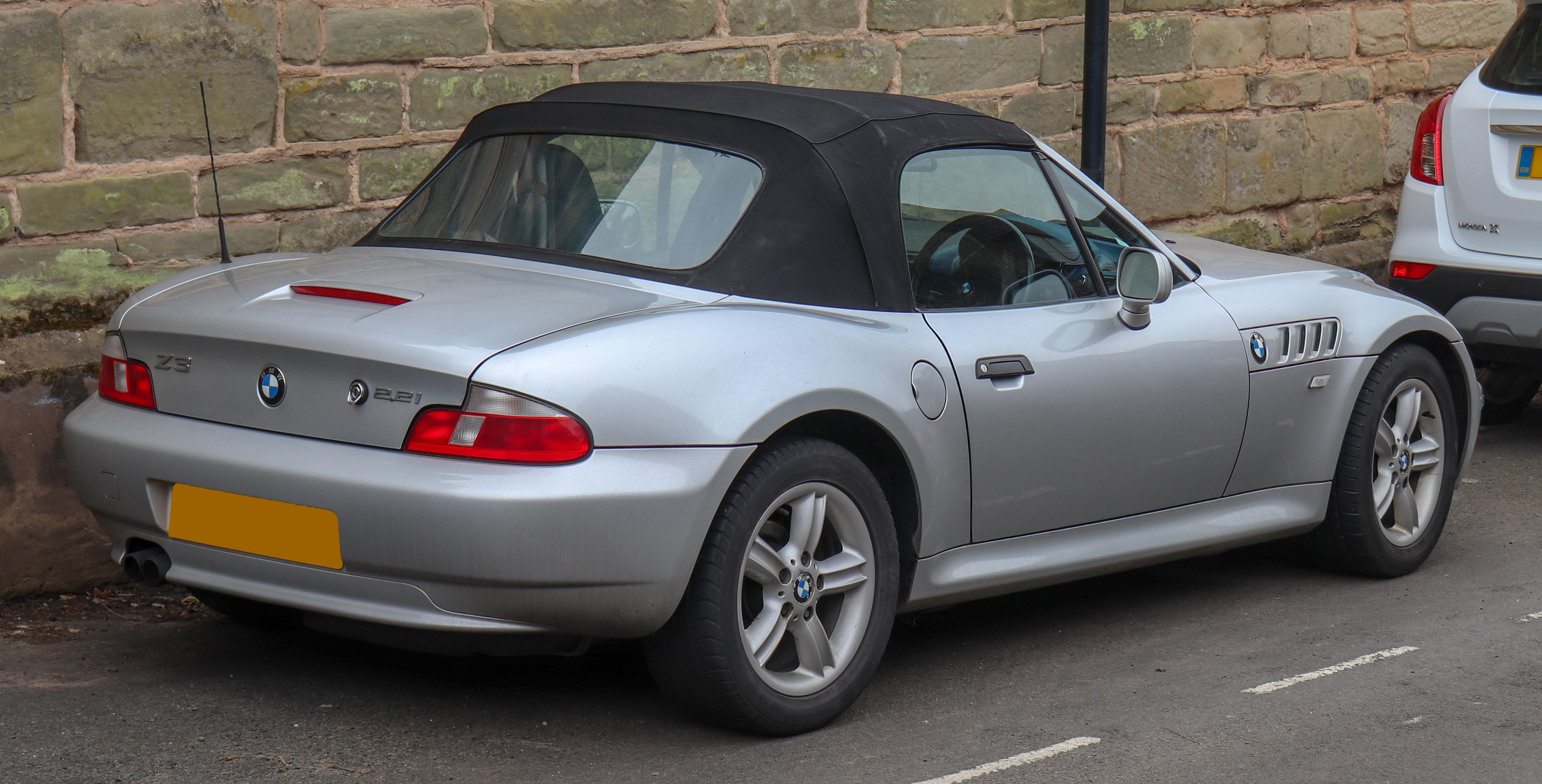
BMW Z3 (rear view; facelift)

The Z3 was the first modern mass-market roadster produced by BMW. It was introduced for the 1996 model year shortly after being featured in the James Bond movie GoldenEye. More than 15,000 were sold by the time the car was introduced. The Z3 underwent a facelift in 1999 with the introduction of a coupé bodystyle and featured revised styling, before the end of its production run in 2002. The coupé had controversial styling and was nicknamed as "clown shoe". It was manufactured and assembled in Spartanburg, South Carolina.

== BMW Z8 (E52; 1999–2003) ==
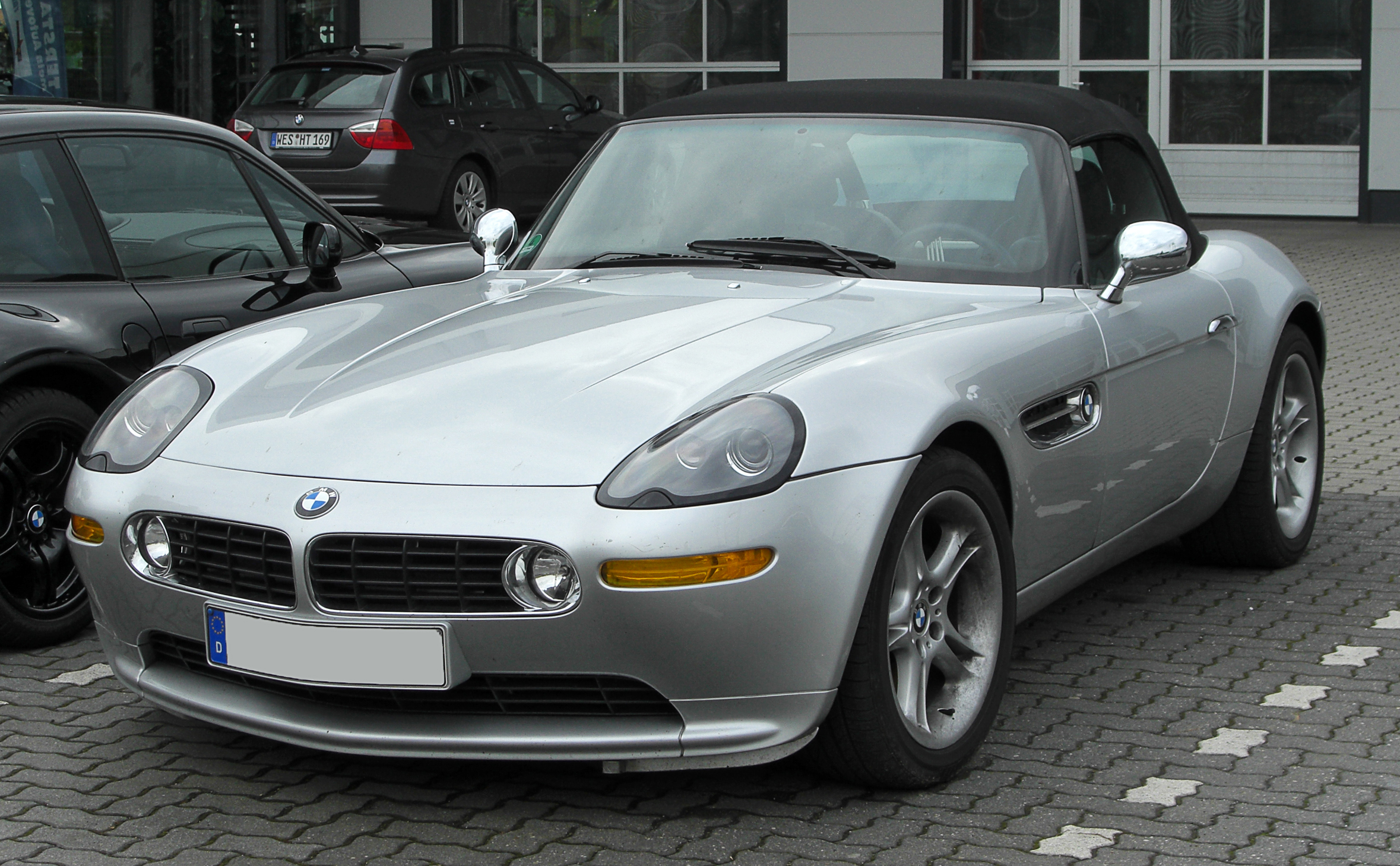
BMW Z8

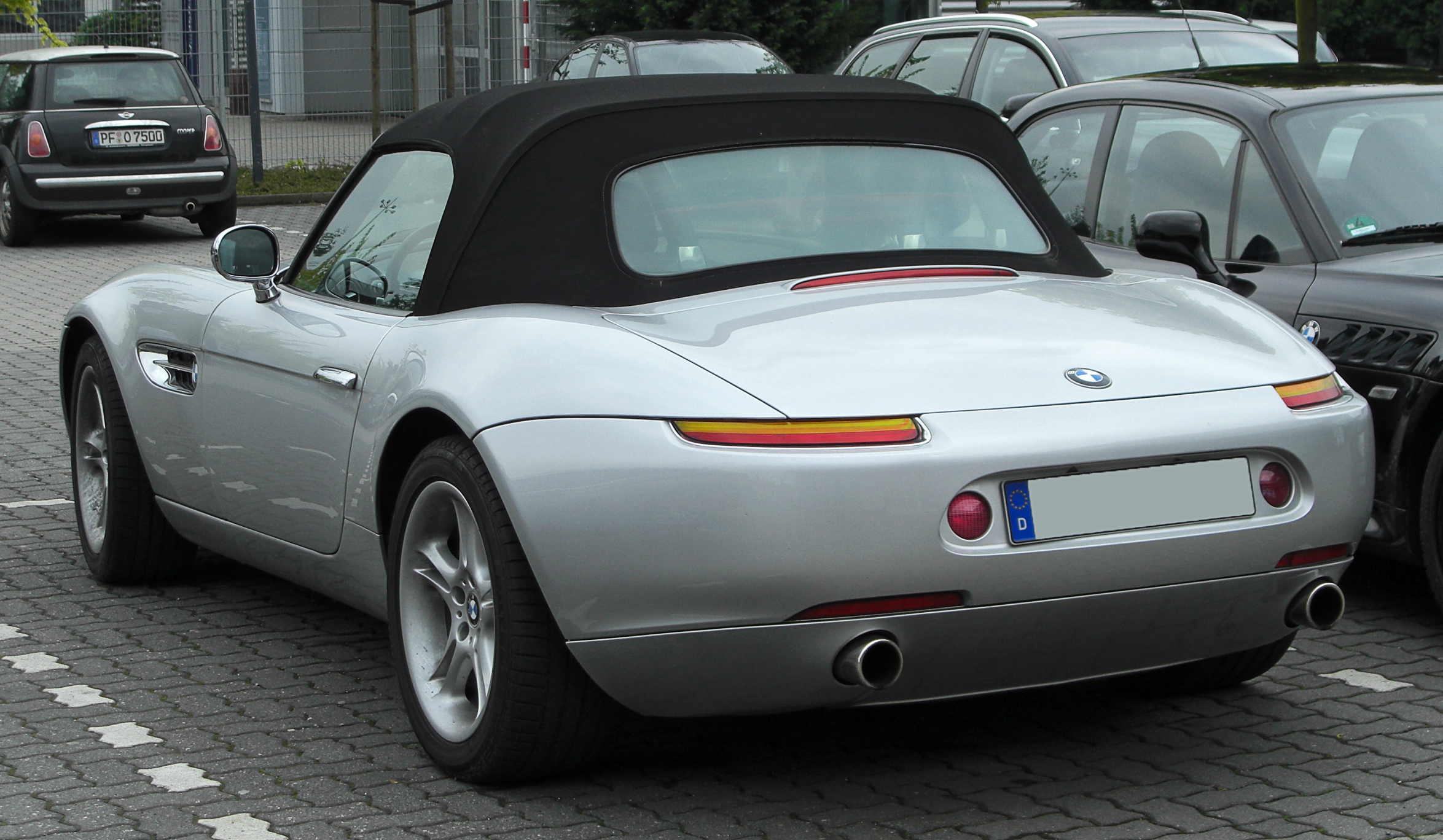
BMW Z8 (rear view)

The Z8 was produced from 1999 to 2003 and was the production variant of the 1997 Z07 concept car, which was designed by Danish Henrik Fisker at BMW's DesignworksUSA. The Z07 originally was designed as a styling exercise to celebrate the 507 roadster of the 1950s, but the overwhelming popularity of the concept spurred BMW's decision to produce a limited production model called the Z8. 5,703 cars were built, approximately half of which were exported to the United States.

== BMW Z4 (E85/E86; 2003–2008) ==
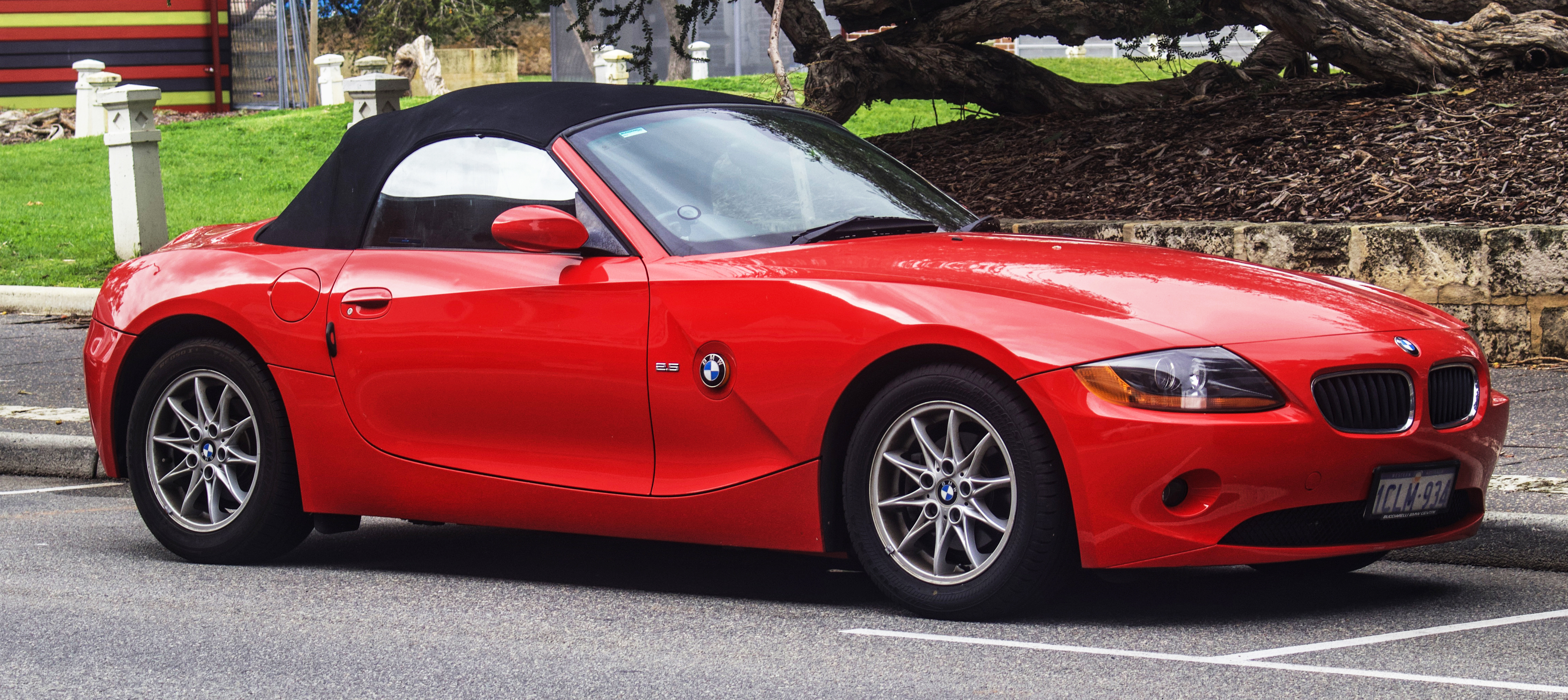
BMW Z4 Roadster

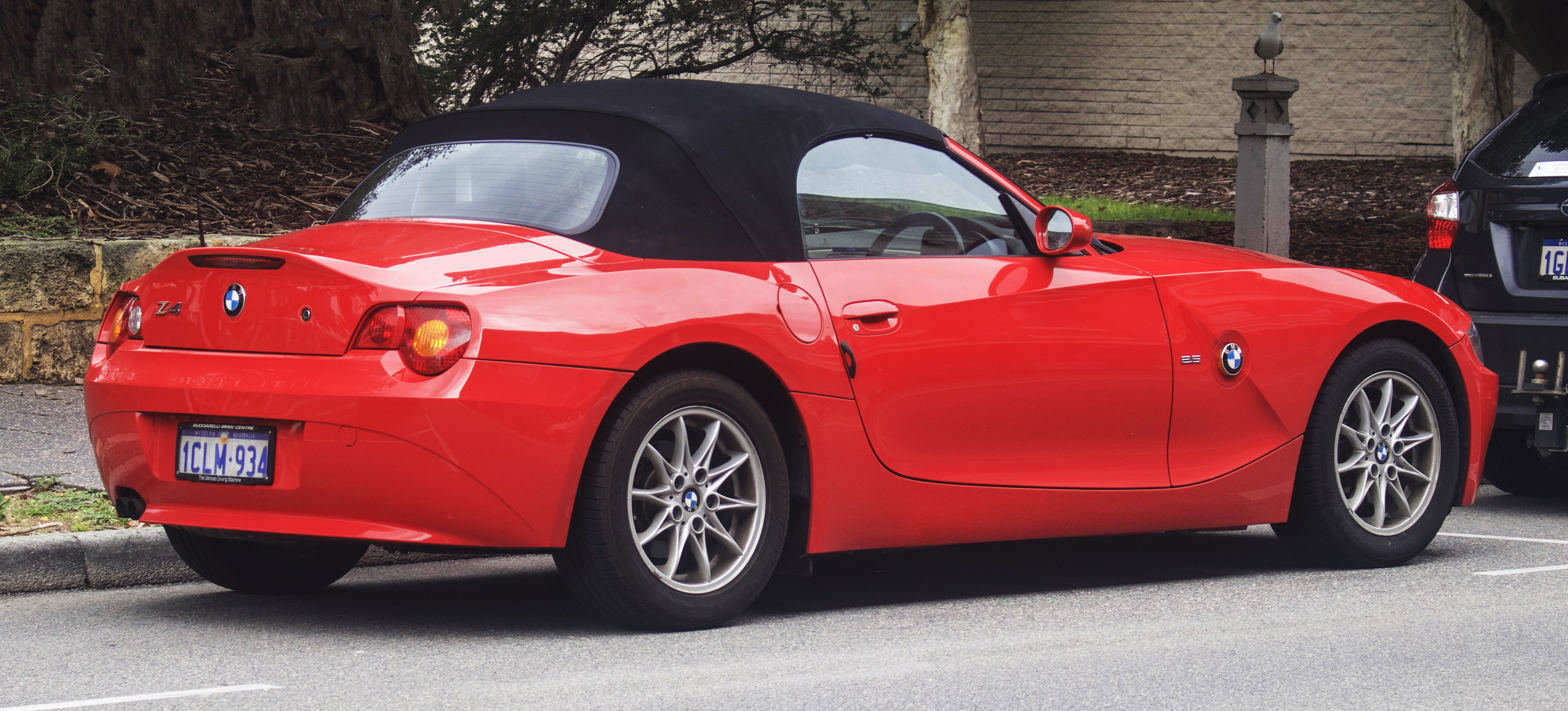
BMW Z4 Roadster

The first-generation BMW Z4 was known as the E85 in roadster form and E86 in coupé form. It was designed by Danish BMW-designer Anders Warming.

The Z4's design addressed many criticisms of the preceding Z3; it was larger and featured a significantly stiffer chassis. The Z4 was initially only available as a roadster, but a coupé version was officially launched in 2006. The last model was manufactured on 27 August 2008 at the Spartanburg plant.

== BMW Z4 (E89; 2009–2016) ==
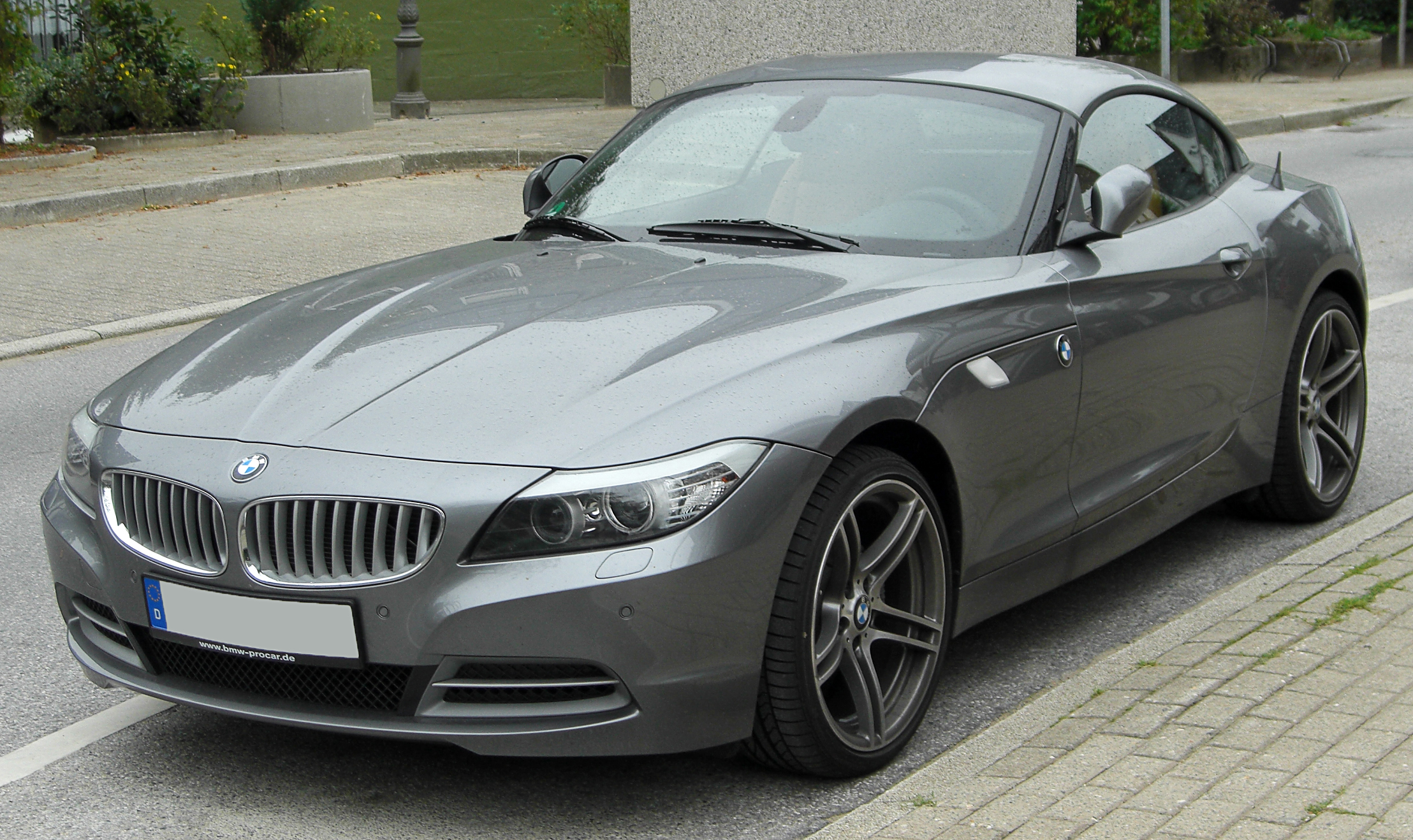
BMW Z4

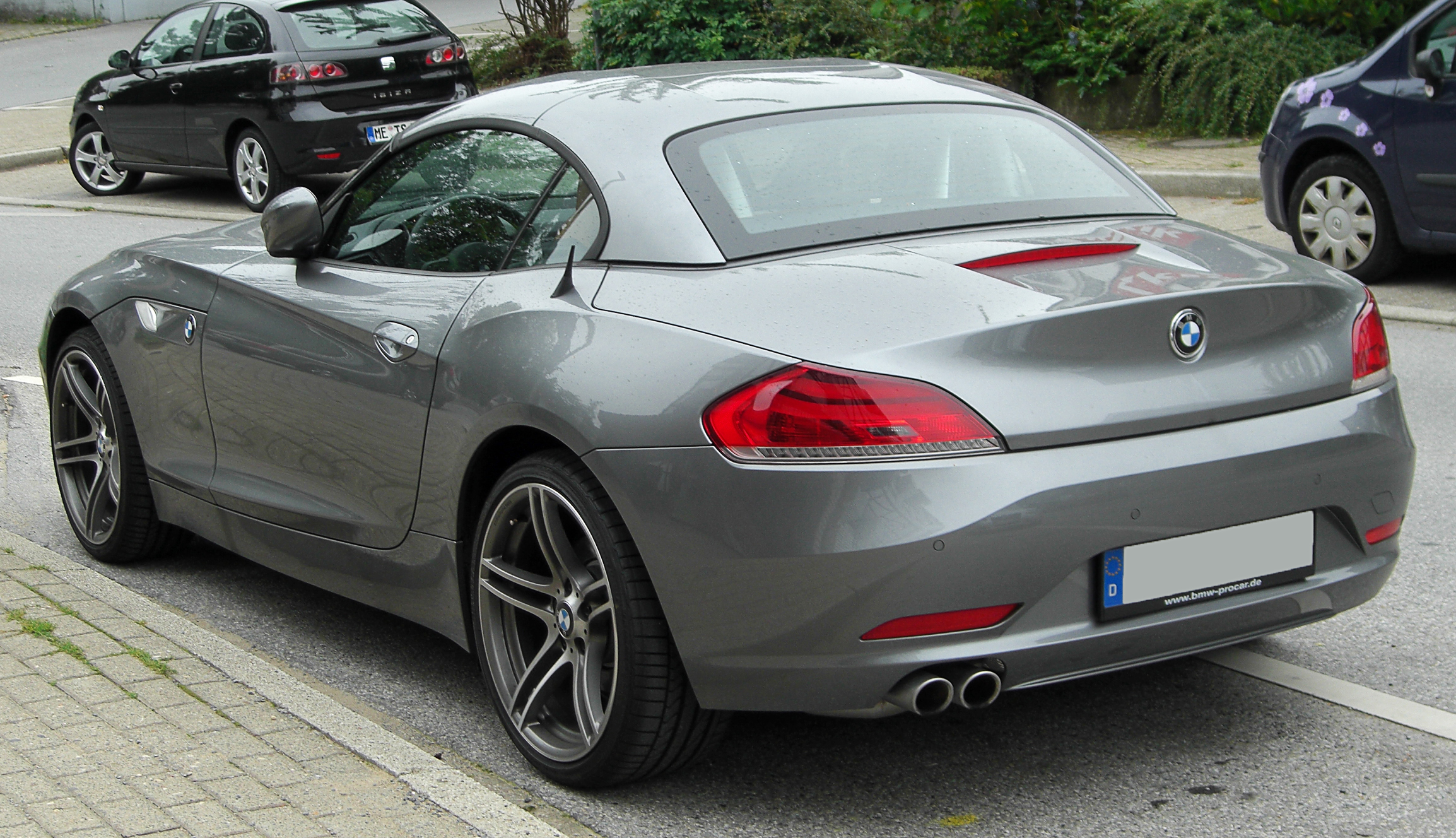
BMW Z4

The second-generation Z4 was announced on 13 December 2008 and debuted at the 2009 North American International Auto Show in Detroit the following month. It is the first Z Series model to use a retractable hardtop and meant that there were no longer separate roadster and coupé versions of the car. The top is made of a two-piece lightweight aluminium shell and takes 20 seconds to operate. Manufacturing was moved from Spartanburg, United States to Regensburg, Germany.

== BMW Z4 (G29; 2018–2026) ==
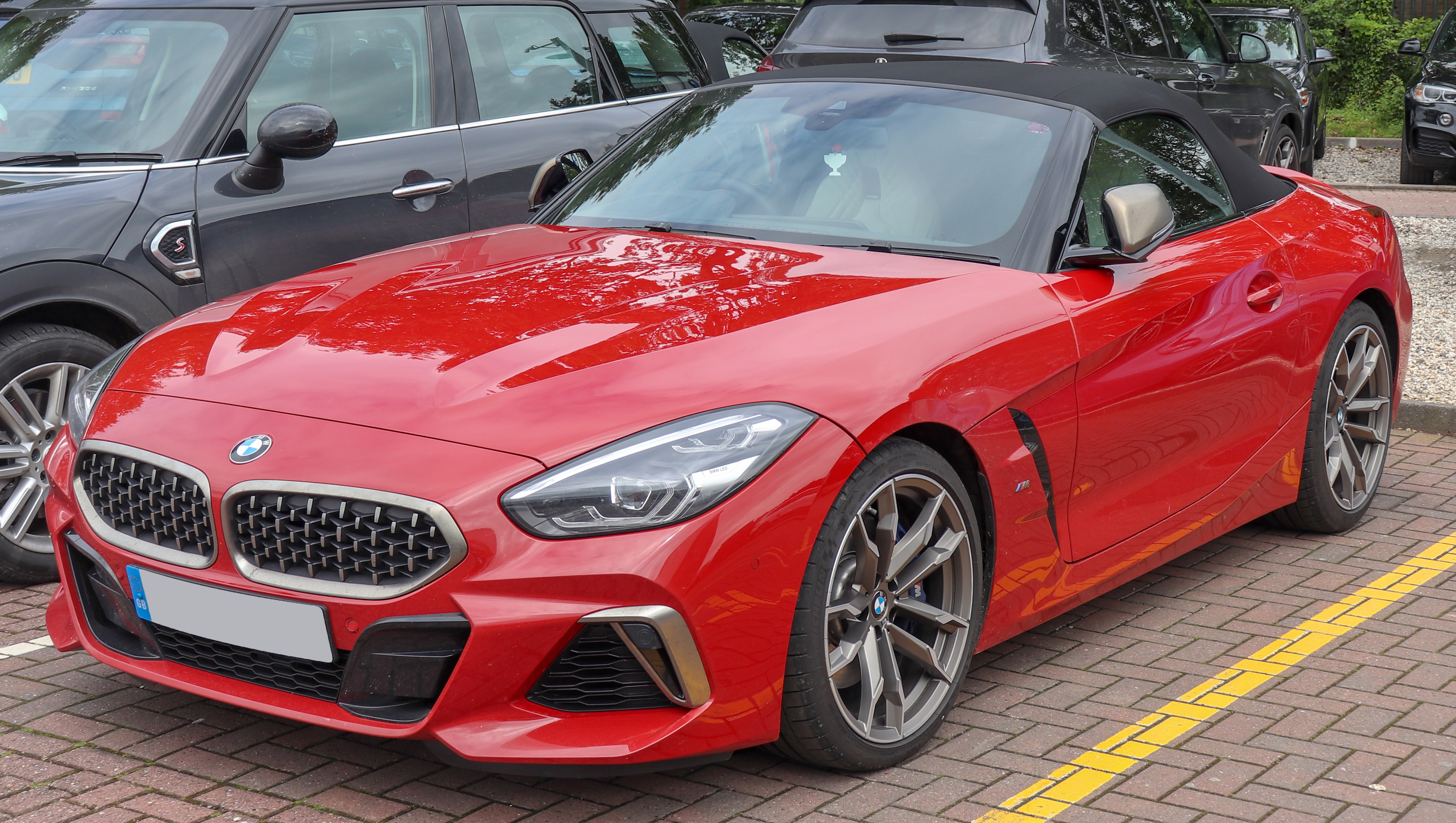
BMW Z4

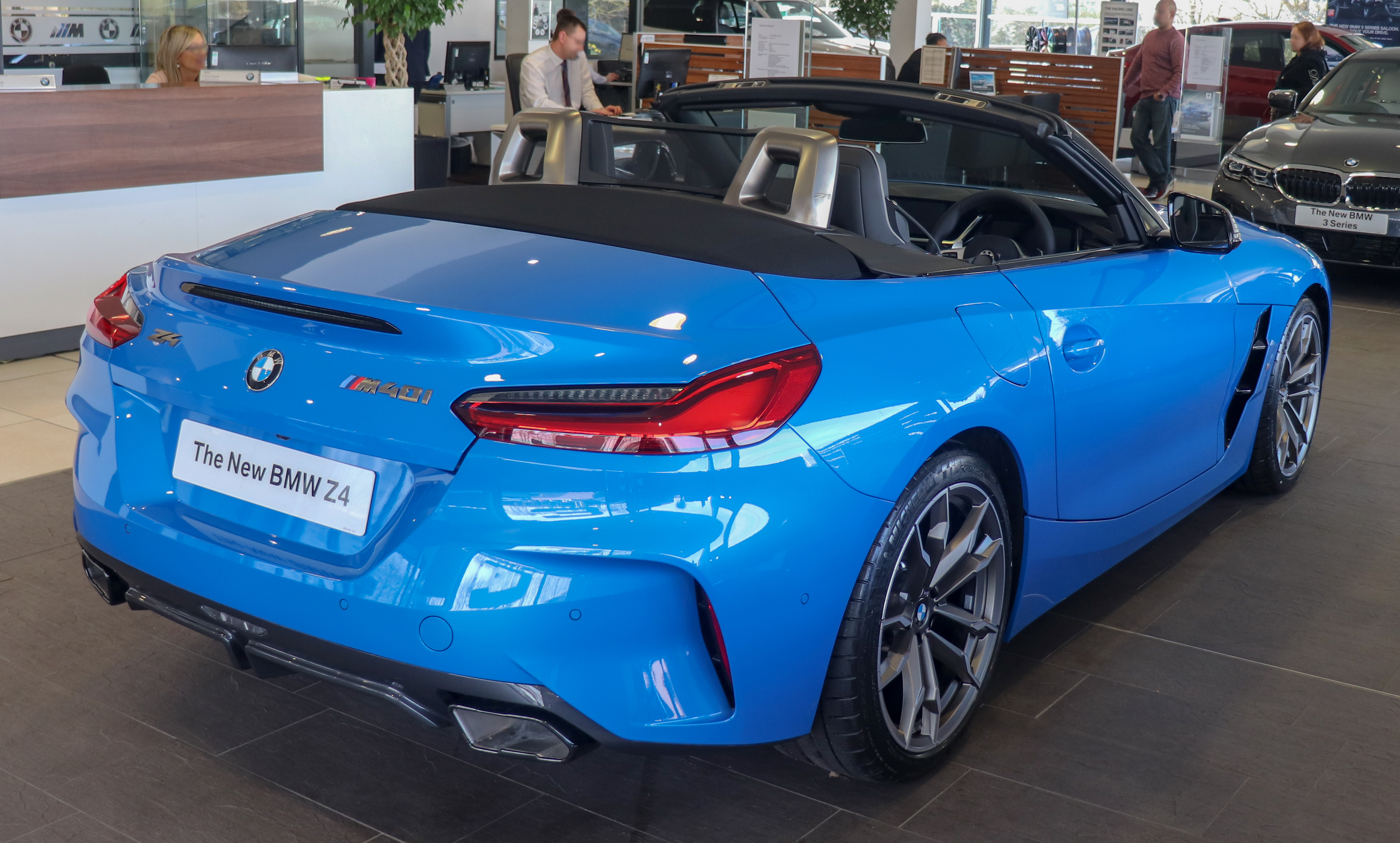
BMW Z4

The G29 Z4 is the third generation Z4 and was unveiled at the Pebble Beach Concours d’Elegance on 23 August 2018. It reuses the soft-top convertible roof found on the E85 Z4 instead of a retractable hardtop which now takes 10 seconds for operation. The G29 Z4 shares its platform with the J29 Toyota Supra and was manufactured in the same plant in Austria.

== Production and sales ==
The following are the production and sales figures for Z models, excluding the Z1:

Year	Production	EU sales	US sales
1996		-	15,040
1997	57,100	30,954	19,760
1998	53,000	27,776	20,613
1999	51,000	24,268	20,062
2000	42,800	18,681	16,699
2001	39,579	17,358	15,884
2002	26,428	10,749	10,490
2003	52,016	24,224	20,324
2004	38,483	18,593	13,654
2005	28,808	14,137	10,045
2006	30,981	15,844	12,284
2007	28,383	15,281	10,097
2008	18,006	6,116	5,879
2009	22,761	13,497	3,523
2010	24,575	13,153	3,804
2011	18,809	9,417	3,479
2012	15,249	7,508	2,751
2013	12,866	5,970	2,480
2014	10,802	5,373	2,151
2015	7,950	4,093	1,829
2016	5,432	3,006	1,187
2017	-	244	502
2018	-	125	4
2019	-	9,681	2,941
Total:	585,028	271,086	211,354

Year	China
2023	1,304
2024	1,095
2025	658

== Z9 Concept (1999) ==
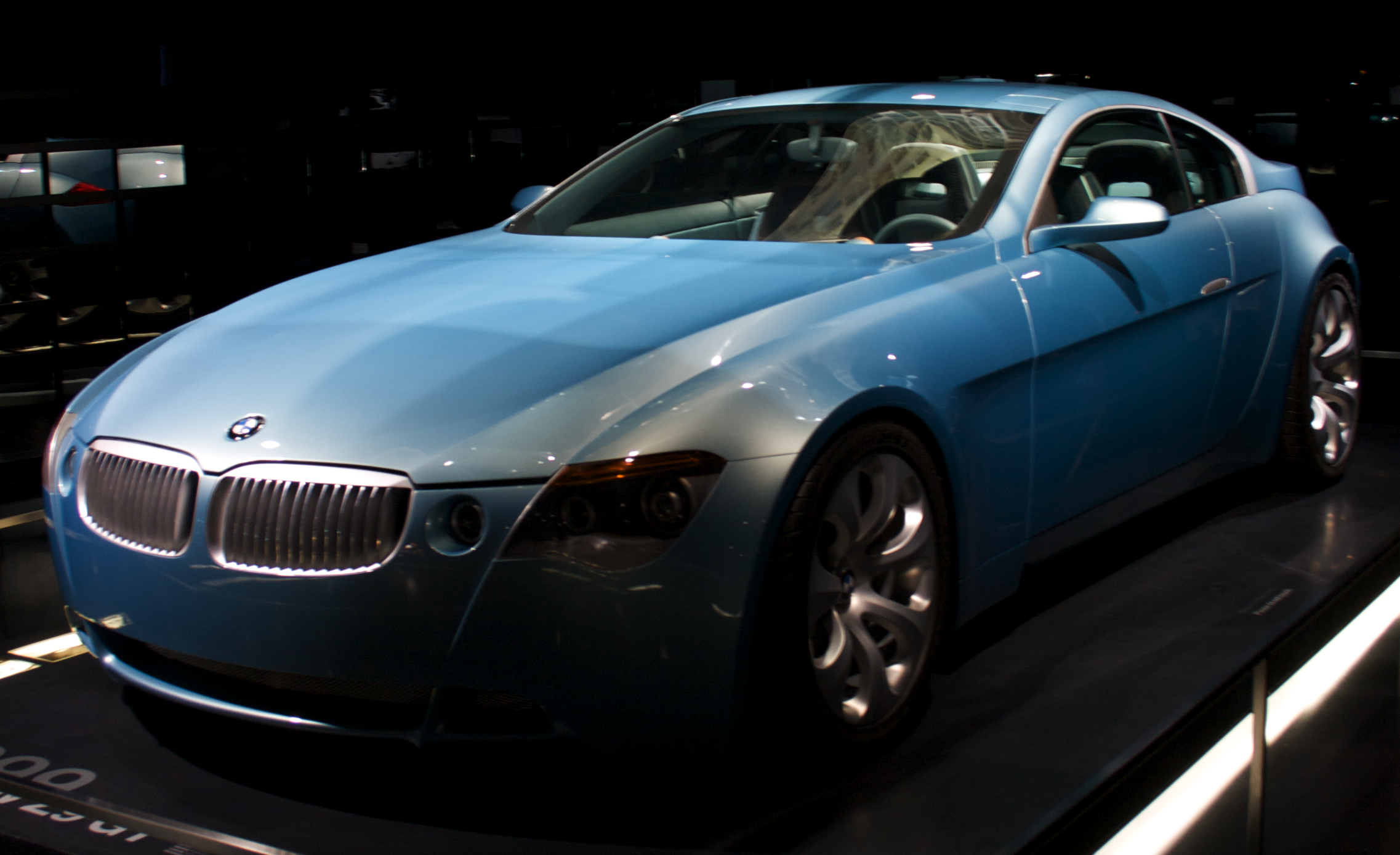
1999 BMW Z9 Concept

The BMW Z9 (or Z9 Gran Turismo) is a concept coupé introduced at the 1999 Frankfurt Auto Show, with a convertible variant later unveiled at the 2000 Paris Auto Show. The vehicle features unique gull-wing doors that also opened like a conventional hinged door and innovations such as an early concept of BMW's iDrive system, called the Intuitive Interaction Concept, were incorporated into other production vehicles. Much of the styling found on the E63 6 Series is also derived from the Z9.

== See also ==
- List of BMW vehicles
