= Stellar Jet =

US-based Swiss aerospace manufacturer

- Industry: Aviation
- Founded: 2021
- Founder: Alexey Popov
- Headquarters: Delaware, United States
- Website: stellaraircraft.com

Stellar Jet is a US-based Swiss aerospace manufacturer focused on developing hydrogen-powered vertical‐takeoff‐and‐landing (VTOL) aircraft. Originally founded as Sirius Aviation AG, the company rebranded to Stellar Aircraft (or Stellar Aviation) and has become known for its concept and development of the Stellar Jet.

== History ==
The company was founded by Alexey Popov in 2021 under Sirius Aviation AG. The initial phase mainly focused on R&D and had a team of over 100 engineers.

In February 2024, Stellar Jet partnered with India-based seaplane operator MEHAIR for over 50 jets valued at $400 million. In March, Stellar Jet introduced two aircraft with zero emissions, the CEO Jet and Adventure Jet, at the MOVE Expo in London. In March 2024, the company partnered with PARQ Development for an investment of $50 million to help air travel and tourism in Bali, Indonesia. In August 2024, Stellar Jet partnered with Marathon Group Australia in Sydney to implement zero emission airports. In 2025, the company rebranded to Stellar Aircraft and moved its headquarters to Delaware, US.

== Fleet ==
The CEO-Jet is targeted towards leisure and business flights, while the Adventure Jet focuses on adventure-based activities as it can fly over mountains, through jungles, and other regions a typical aircraft may not reach. The jets are co-designed by BMW's Designworks and Sauber Motorsport.

Aircraft	Seats	Power	Speed	Range	Capacity
CEO-Jet	Up to 3 passengers	28000 N	323 Mph (520 Km/H)	1150 Mi (1850 Km)	1350 lbs (612 Kg)
Adventure Jet	Up to 5 passengers	52000 N	323 Mph (520 Km/H)	650 Mi (1050 Km)	3050 lbs (1384 Kg)
