= Joan Gregor =

Joan Gregor is an American design strategist and co-founder of The Design Academy, Inc.

In 2000 she founded The Design Academy with her partner Chuck Pelly. It is a multidisciplinary consulting group, dedicated to applying product design and creative knowledge to corporations and organizations through a “Power of Collective Thought”. She is a design strategist helping companies leverage the value of design and develops guidelines around design metrics. She undertook postgraduate studies in Marketing at Northeastern University, BS consumer studies at the University of New Hampshire and associate degree in accounting at Bentley College.

She is the co-founder and director of Design Los Angeles conference and Design Challenge for LA Auto Show.
