= Chuck Pelly =

American industrial designer

Charles Whipple Pelly, commonly Chuck Pelly, is an American industrial designer. Pelly is best known for founding the global design consultancy DesignworksUSA.

He has spent most of his life in Southern California. He attended the Art Center College of Design in Pasadena, California and studied for his Master's degree.

After graduating from Art Center College of Design, he studied furniture and interior design in Konstfack, University College of Art, Crafts and Design in Stockholm, Sweden. He then worked in several renowned design offices, including Henry Dreyfuss Associates where he was instrumental in developing early ergonomics, Measure of Man. Pelly still holds a long term relationship to Art Center, as he was involved as student, teacher, mentor and lecturer.

In 1972 Pelly became founder of DesignworksUSA, today considered by some as one of the top 10 industrial design consultancies in the world. In 1995, DesignworksUSA became wholly owned subsidiary of BMW. Pelly was president and CEO until 2000 of the Newbury Park & Munich branches.

In 2000 Pelly and his partner Joan Gregor founded The Design Academy, Inc.

With the recent launch of Intersection-Inc., an offshoot of The Design Academy, Chuck is responsible for Creative Direction.

== Design highlights ==
- 1958–1960: Designer of the 6 Scarab sports car for Lance Reventlow
- 1961: Storyboard and set design for television series Lost in Space
- 1962: VW Beetle Stretch Limo, Scarab and Chaparral race car
- 1967: 4-door Porsche 911 Sedan
- 1972: Porsche 910S
- 1974: IMED Infusion Pump
- 1975: C Pelly seating line for Condi Furniture, Compton, CA/ Grammer, Amberg, Germany, marketed until 2001
- 1984: Crista seating line, SunarHauserman and Pelican Desk Series, Brueton Industries
- 1985: Seating and interior for Disney monorail, Disney, Burbank, California
- 1986: Varix seating line, Samsonite Furniture Co., Murfreesboro, Tennessee
- 1989: Magna International, Torrero research vehicle, Geneva Auto Show, Switzerland
- 1994: Designworks/USA’s concept and development of BMW’s E2, electric vehicle
- 1998: Designworks/USA’s concept involvement in the BMW E46 (3 Series)
- 1999: Designworks/USA’s concept involvement in BMW E63-1999 Sport Activity Vehicle, Hanover, Germany, Land Rover Range Rover
- 2002: Designed & custom built “Cattiva”, a 43 foot world class catamaran, New Zealand
- 2004–2006: Lifestyle vehicle and trailer design for Magna International
- 2005–Present: Co-founder and director of Design Los Angeles conference and Design Challenge for LA Auto Show.

Pelly has been awarded over 40 US and foreign Patents.

== Awards ==
- Chuck was president is IDSA, Industrial Designers Society of America, FIDSA 1991-1992
