= BMW Z4 (E85) =

BMW Z4 (E85/E86)
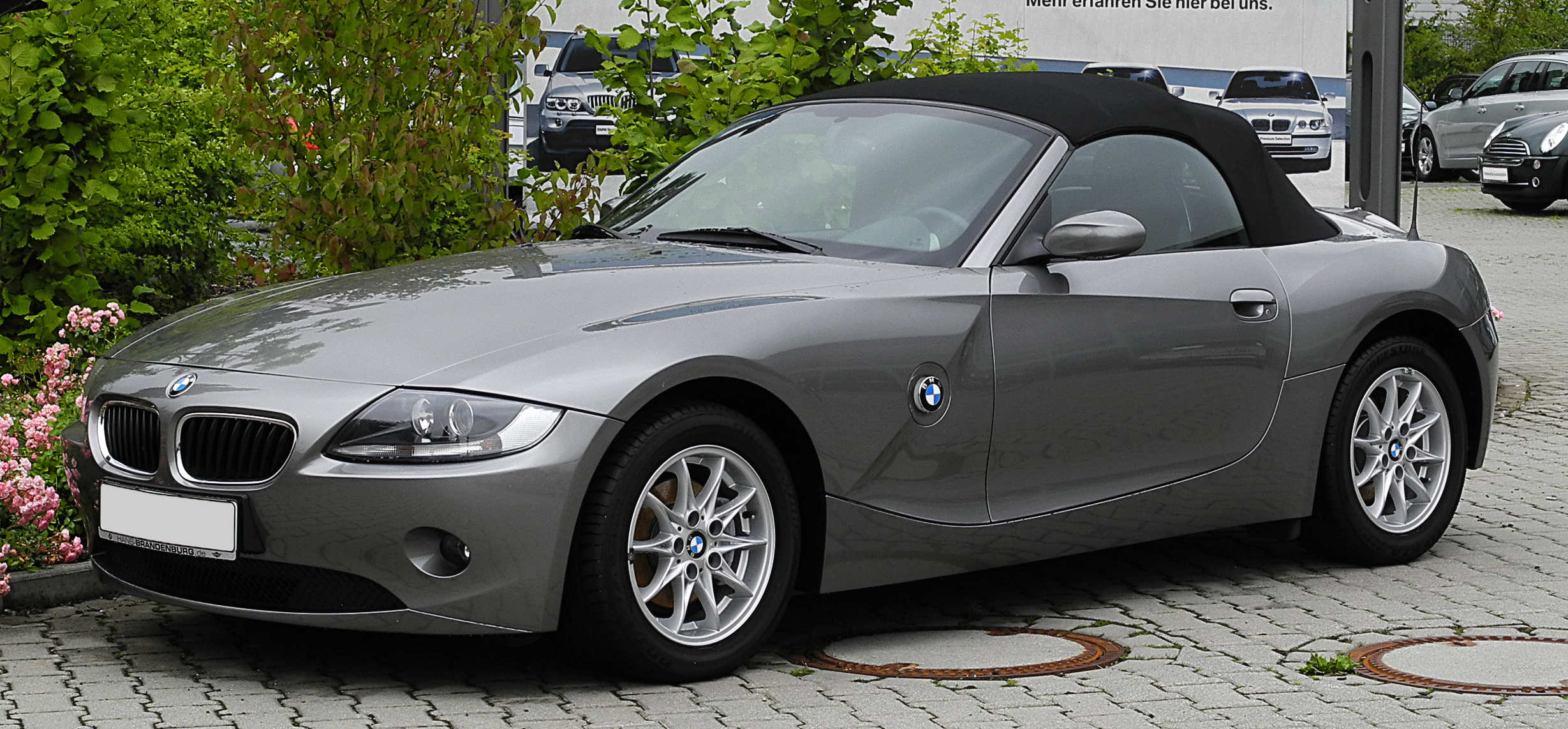

Overview
- Manufacturer: BMW
- Model code: E85 (roadster); E86 (coupe)
- Production: July 2002 – December 2008
- Model years: 2003–2008
- Assembly: United States: Greer, South Carolina (Plant Spartanburg)
- Designer: Anders Warming (E85); Thomas Sycha (E86)

Body and chassis
- Class: Sports car (S)
- Body style: 2-door roadster; 2-door coupé
- Layout: Front-engine, rear-wheel-drive
- Related: BMW 3 Series (E46); BMW 3 Series Compact (E46/5)

Powertrain
- Engine: Petrol: 2.0 L N46 I4; 2.2–3.2 L M54/N52/S54 I6
- Transmission: 5-speed manual; 6-speed manual; 5-speed automatic; 6-speed automatic; 6-speed SMG-II

Dimensions
- Wheelbase: 2,495 mm (98.2 in)
- Length: 4,090 mm (161.0 in)
- Width: 1,780 mm (70.1 in)
- Height: E85: 1,300 mm (51.2 in); E86: 1,285 mm (50.6 in)

Chronology
- Predecessor: BMW Z3
- Successor: BMW Z4 (E89)

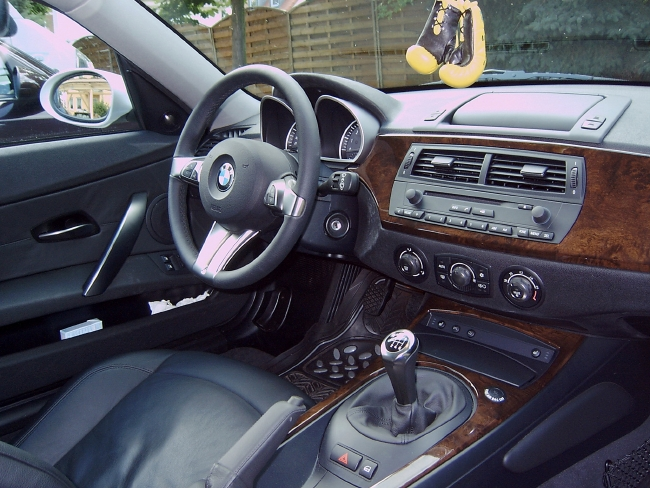
Interior

The first generation of the BMW Z4 consists of the BMW E85 (roadster version) and BMW E86 (coupe version) sports cars. The E85/E86 generation was produced from 2002 to 2008. The E85/E86 replaced the Z3 and is the fourth model in the BMW Z Series. Initial models were in the roadster (E85) body style, with the coupé (E86) body style being added in 2006. In February 2009, the BMW Z4 (E89) began production as the successor to the E85/E86.

As was its Z3 predecessor, the E85/E86 was manufactured in Greer, South Carolina. The M model, the Z4 M, is powered by the S54 straight-six engine.

== Development and launch ==
The E85 was designed by Danish BMW-designer Anders Warming from mid-1998 to the summer of 1999. The coupe models were designed by Tomasz Sycha. The E85 designs were frozen on March 1, 2000. The Z4 was introduced at the Paris Motor Show in 2002, and North American models went on sale in November of the same year (as the 2003 model year). European sales began in March 2003.

Initial models consisted of the roadster body style powered by a 2.5L or 3.0L 6-cylinder engine.

== Body styles ==
=== Roadster (E85) ===
The Z4 Roadster was launched in 2002 with the 2.5i and 3.0i six-cylinder models. Transmission choices were a five-speed manual, six-speed manual, five-speed automatic and a six-speed SMG-II automated manual transmission.

A four-cylinder model, the Z4 2.0i Roadster, was introduced for the European market in May 2005.

The drag coefficient is maximum of Cd=0.35.

=== Coupé (E86) ===
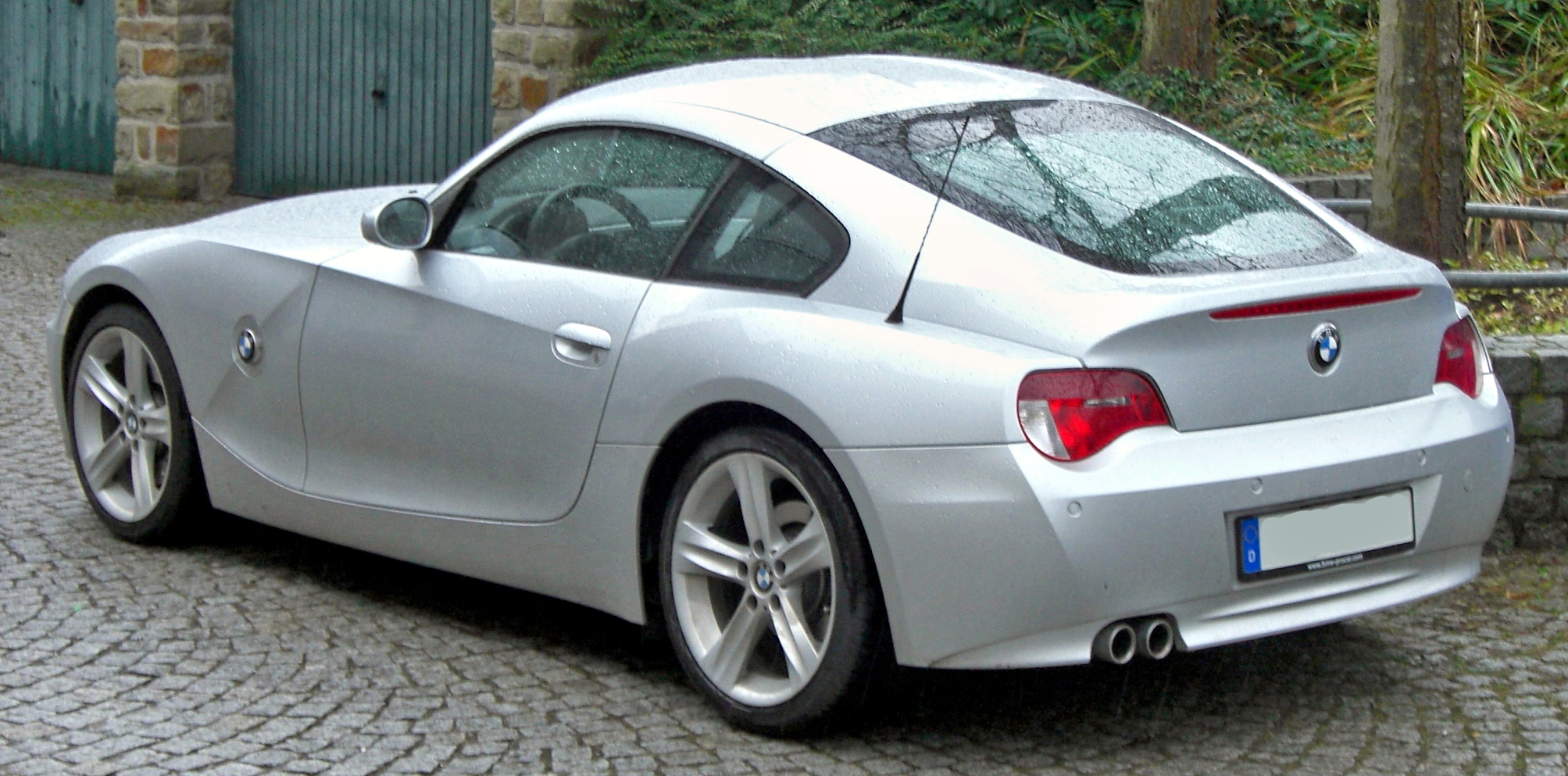
Coupé (rear view)

BMW unveiled a concept coupé version of the Z4 at the 2005 Frankfurt Motor Show. The design of the Z4 and Z4 coupé has variously been ascribed to Anders Warming, Chris Bangle, the controversial former BMW Head of Design, and Adrian van Hooydonk, former BMW chief designer, and BMW designer Tomasz Sycha. The design was approved in Summer of 2004 and frozen in December 2004. The company announced in 2005 that the two-door coupé would be available for production including the return of the M Coupé. The production car was introduced at the New York Auto Show in April 2006 and was available for sale in late May 2006.

Thanks to its hatch design, the Z4 Coupé offers 10.1 cu ft (0.29 m^{3}) of trunk space, compared with 8.5 cu ft (0.24 m^{3}) for the roadster.

The Coupe's fixed roof increases torsional rigidity, resulting in a stiffness of 32,000 N⋅m (24,000 lb⋅ft) per degree of body twist on the coupe (compared to 14,500 N⋅m (10,700 lb⋅ft) per degree on the roadster), which improves turn-in and overall handling response. The roof has a "double-bubble" contour which serves as an aerodynamic aid and offers more headroom than the roadster with the soft top closed. The Coupé has a sleek fastback rear window that slopes down to an integrated spoiler which is shaped to deliver downforce to the rear axle at high-speed.

The model range for the Coupé was more limited than the roadster, and consisted of the six-cylinder 3.0si and Z4 M model only. Transmission choices were a 6-speed manual and a 6-speed automatic with shift paddles mounted on the steering column.

== Chassis and body ==
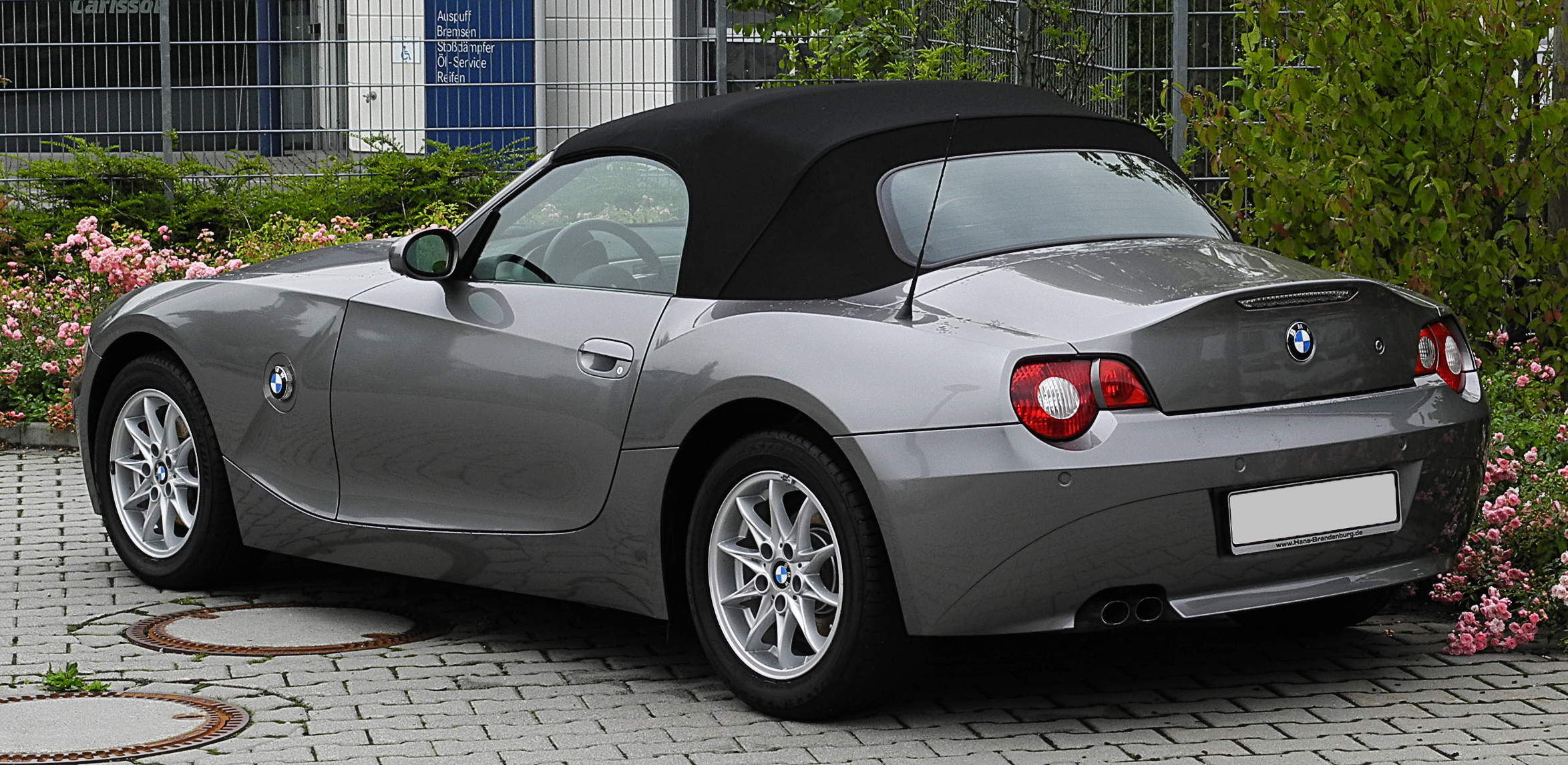
Convertible (pre-facelift)

Compared with its Z3 predecessor, the Z4 is larger and has a stiffer chassis. As per the Z3, the front suspension is a Macpherson strut design. The rear suspension uses a multi-link design, instead of the semi-trailing design used by the Z3.

The Z4 used lightweight materials to offset the increased weight over the smaller Z3, such as an aluminum hood and suspension components, magnesium roof frame. Run-flat tires removed the need for a spare tire, which reduces weight and allows for a larger trunk.

== Equipment ==
The 6-cylinder engines included all-alloy construction, variable valve timing (double-VANOS), and throttle by wire. Safety technology included four-wheel disc brakes and electronic stability control, incorporating ABS and traction control.

An optional "Sport Package" included added stiffer and lower suspension, 18 inch wheels, and sport tuned electronic steering, throttle and shift parameters ("Dynamic Driving Control").

Electric power steering replaced the traditional hydraulic power steering used by the Z3. The power assist is speed-sensitive, allowing for easier maneuvering at low speeds. However, the Z4 M uses hydraulic power steering, and has been judged as having a more direct and communicative feel to the steering.

In 2002, a 6-speed SMG gearbox was offered as an option on the 2.5 and 3.0 roadsters.

== Transmissions ==
The available transmissions were:

- 5-speed manual Getrag S5D250G (2.2i, 2.5i)
- 6-speed manual Getrag GS6-17BG (2.0i)
- 6-speed manual ZF GS6-37BZ-TJEE (Z4M)
- 6-speed manual ZF GS6-37BZ-THEA/TJES (3.0&3.0si)
- 5-speed automatic ZF 5HP19 (2.2i, 2.5i, 3.0i ~ MY 03–05)
- 6-speed automatic ZF 6HP19 (2.5si, 3.0i, 3.0si ~ MY 06–08)
- 6-speed automated manual (SMG) GS6-S37BZ (2.5i, 3.0i)

== Models ==
| Model | Years | Engine | Power | Torque | Kerb Weight | 0–100 km/h (62 mph) |
|---|---|---|---|---|---|---|
| 2.0i* | 2005–2008 | 2.0 L N46B20; 4-cyl | 110 kW (150 PS; 148 hp) at 6,200 rpm | 200 N⋅m (148 lb⋅ft) at 3,600 rpm | 2,855 lb (1,295 kg) | 8.2 seconds |
| 2.2i | 2003–2005 | 2.2 L M54B22; 6-cyl | 125 kW (170 PS; 168 hp) at 6,100 rpm | 210 N⋅m (155 lb⋅ft) at 3,500 rpm | 2,921 lb (1,325 kg) | 7.7 seconds |
| 2.5i | 2003–2005 | 2.5 L M54B25; 6-cyl | 141 kW (192 PS; 189 hp) at 6,000 rpm | 245 N⋅m (181 lb⋅ft) at 3,500 rpm | 2,943 lb (1,335 kg) | 7.0 seconds |
| 2.5i | 2006–2008 | 2.5 L N52B25; 6-cyl | 130 kW (177 PS; 174 hp) at 5,800 rpm | 230 N⋅m (170 lb⋅ft) at 3,500 rpm | 2,965 lb (1,345 kg) | 7.0 seconds |
| 2.5si | 2006–2008 | 2.5 L N52B25; 6-cyl | 160 kW (218 PS; 215 hp) at 6,500 rpm | 250 N⋅m (184 lb⋅ft) at 2,750 rpm | 2,998 lb (1,360 kg) | 6.5 seconds |
| 3.0i | 2002–2005 | 3.0 L M54B30; 6-cyl | 170 kW (231 PS; 228 hp) at 5,900 rpm | 300 N⋅m (221 lb⋅ft) at 3,500 rpm | 3,009 lb (1,365 kg) | 5.9 seconds |
| 3.0i | 2006–2008 | 3.0 L N52B30; 6-cyl | 160 kW (218 PS; 215 hp) at 6,100 rpm | 270 N⋅m (199 lb⋅ft) at 2,500-4,250 rpm | 3,020 lb (1,370 kg) | 6.2 seconds |
| 3.0si Roadster | 2006–2008 | 3.0 L N52B30; 6-cyl | 195 kW (265 PS; 261 hp) at 6,600 rpm | 315 N⋅m (232 lb⋅ft) at 2,750 rpm | 3,086 lb (1,400 kg) | 5.6 seconds |
| 3.0si Coupé | 2006–2008 | 3.0 L N52B30; 6-cyl | 195 kW (265 PS; 261 hp) at 6,600 rpm | 315 N⋅m (232 lb⋅ft) at 2,750 rpm | 3,075 lb (1,395 kg) | 5.6 seconds |
| M Roadster | 2006–2008 | 3.2 L S54B32; 6-cyl | 252 kW (343 PS; 338 hp) at 7,900 rpm | 365 N⋅m (269 lb⋅ft) at 4,900 rpm | 3,197 lb (1,450 kg) | 4.8 seconds |
| M Coupé | 2006–2008 | 3.2 L S54B32; 6-cyl | 252 kW (343 PS; 338 hp) at 7,900 rpm | 365 N⋅m (269 lb⋅ft) at 4,900 rpm | 3,230 lb (1,465 kg) | 4.8 seconds |

* The 2.0i was only sold in Europe.

All models are E85 roadsters except as noted. European specifications shown. North American vehicles may have slightly lower power ratings. US models include 2.5i Roadster, 3.0i Roadster, 3.0si Roadster & Coupé, M Roadster & Coupé.

== Z4 M versions ==
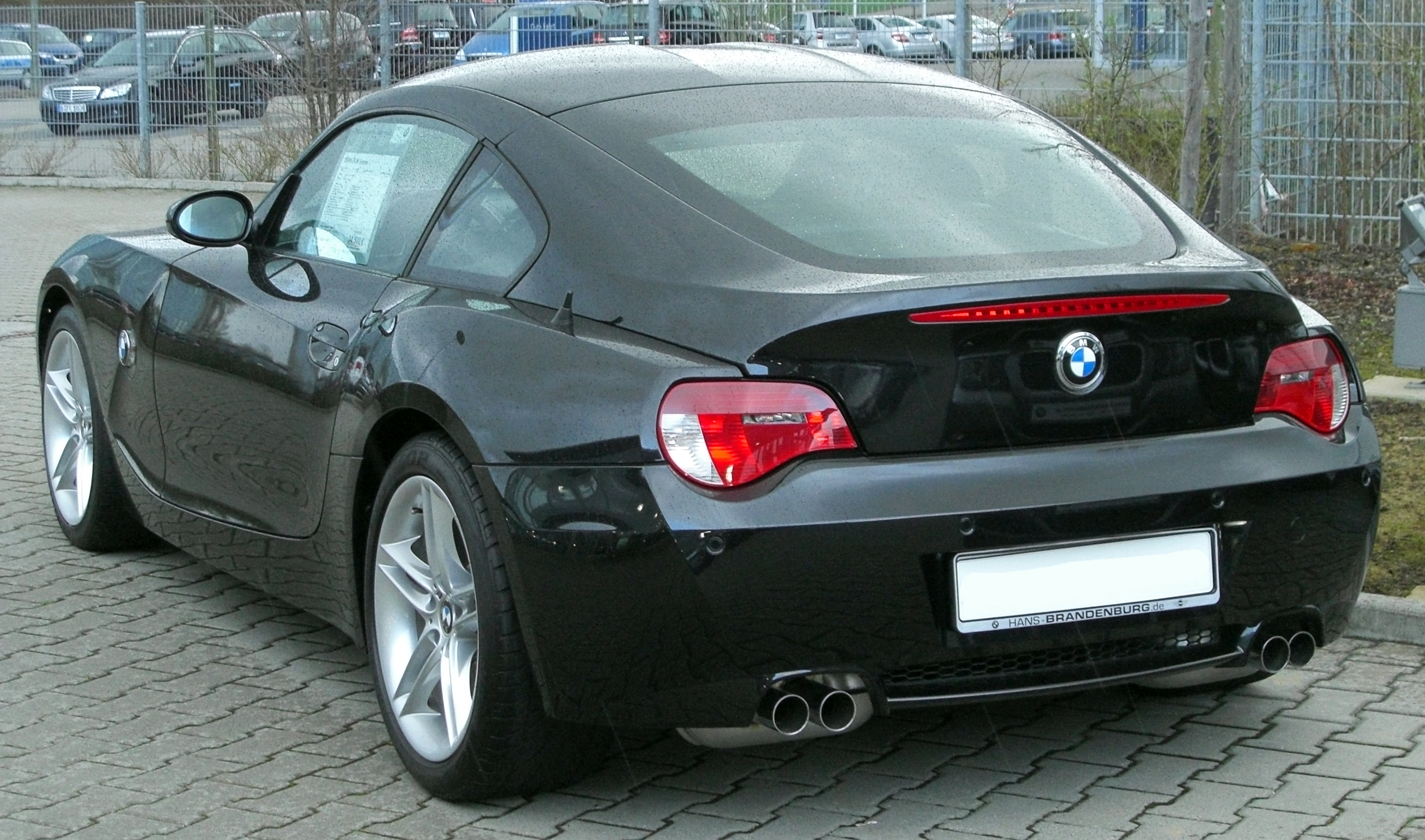
Z4 M Coupé

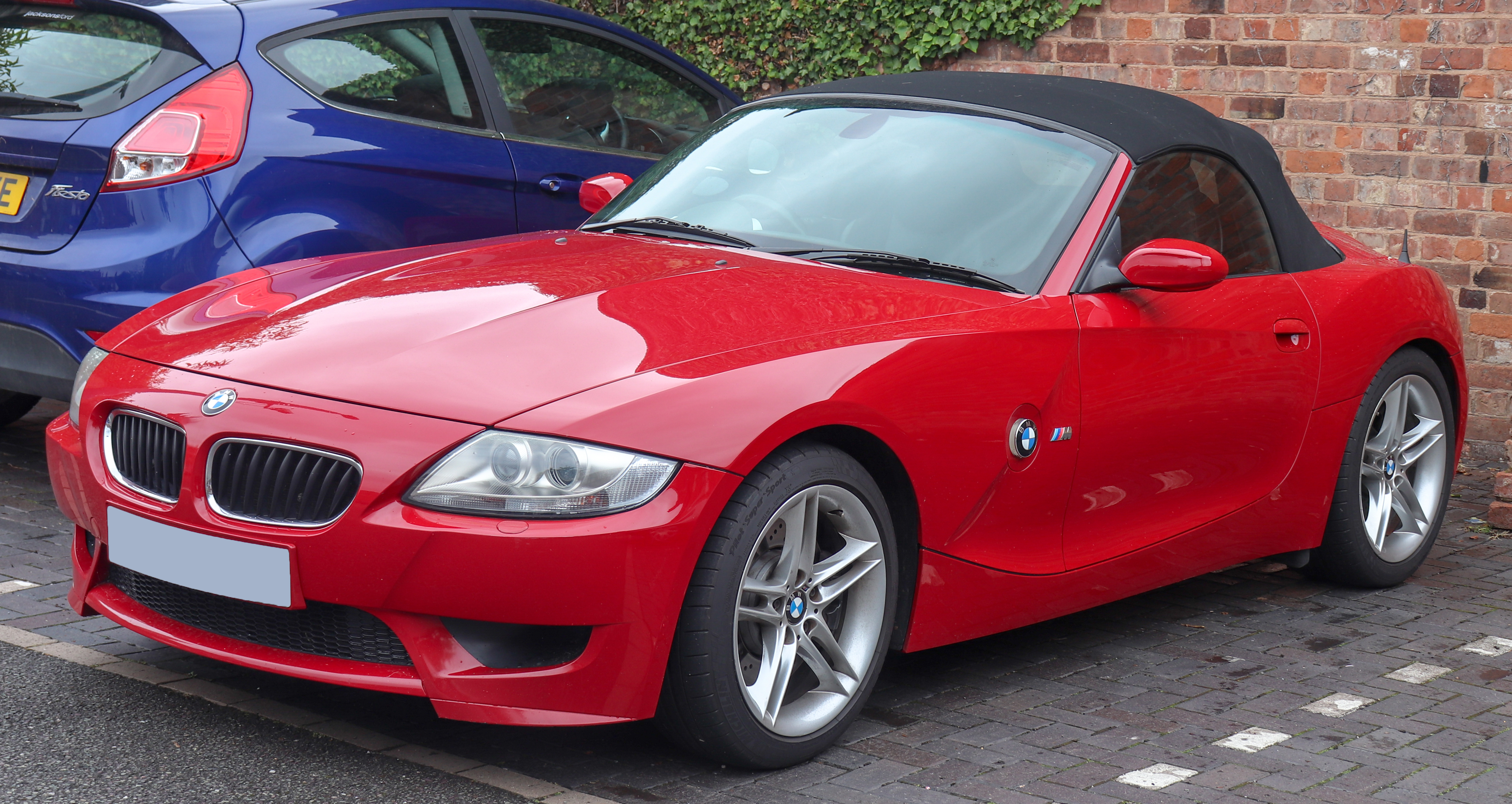
Z4 M Roadster

The Z4 M Coupé/Roadster was introduced in 2006 and is powered by the S54 straight-six engine shared with the E46 M3. The S54 was also on the Ward's 10 Best Engines list for 2001 through 2004. The engine in the North American Z4 M models are rated at 330 hp (246 kW) at 7,900 rpm, 3 hp less than the North American M3. In other markets, the power output is the same 252 kW (343 hp) as the M3. The engine had BMW double VANOS system and a compression ratio of 11.5:1. The torque generated by the engine amounted to 355 N⋅m (262 lb⋅ft) at 4,500 rpm. The torque was available from 2,500 rpm.

The Z4 M uses hydraulic power steering, unlike the electric power steering used by the rest of the Z4 range. The Roadster used the E46 M3 steering rack, the Coupé the faster M3 CS/CSL rack. Other changes include a wider front track, revised front suspension, wider non-runflat-tires (measuring 225/45 at the front, 255/40 at the rear), and steering geometry. The brakes and the entire rear axle was too from the M3 CS/CSL.

The M Coupé's production began at the Spartanburg BMW plant in Greer on 4 April 2006.

== Special models ==
=== Alpina Roadster S (2004–2006) ===
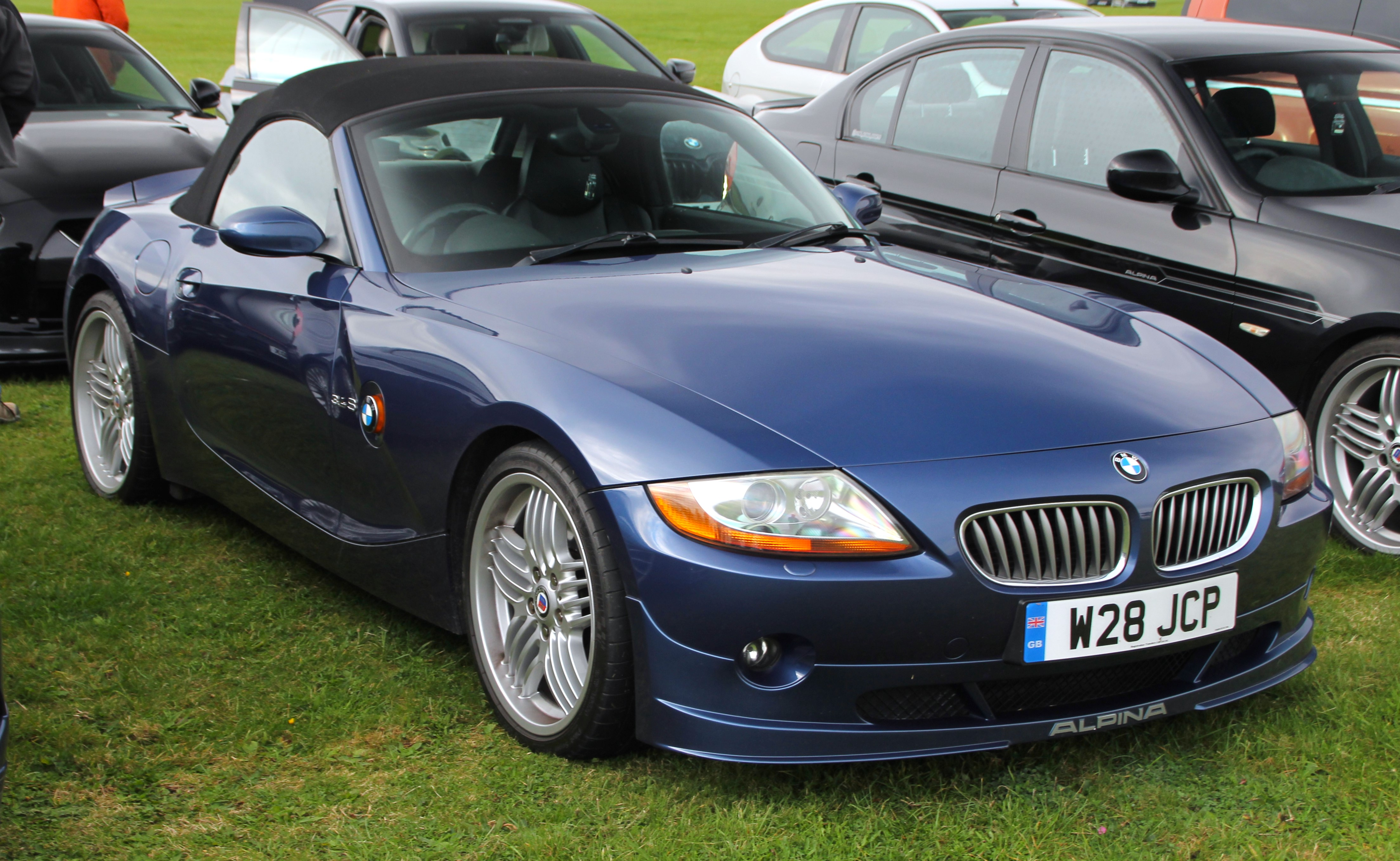
2005 Alpina Roadster S

The Alpina Roadster S is a high-performance iteration of the pre-facelift Z4 introduced at the 2003 Frankfurt Motor Show. Manufactured by German automobile manufacturer Alpina, the Roadster S was assembled at the manufacturer's Buchloe plant from bodies-in-white sent by the Spartanburg BMW factory. The Roadster S was produced for two years (2004 to 2005) before production was halted due to stricter emission regulations stopping engine supplies. The Roadster S was available in two trims, those being Standard and Luxury with the Luxury trim adding more creature comforts and bigger wheels over the Standard trim. The engine was modified by Alpina, now producing 300 PS (221 kW; 296 hp) and 360 N⋅m (266 lb⋅ft) of torque, and the name was changed to E5/2. The car had a claimed top speed of 270 km/h (168 mph) and accelerated to 100 km/h (62 mph) from a standstill in 5.3 seconds.

=== Concept Coupé Mille Miglia (2006) ===
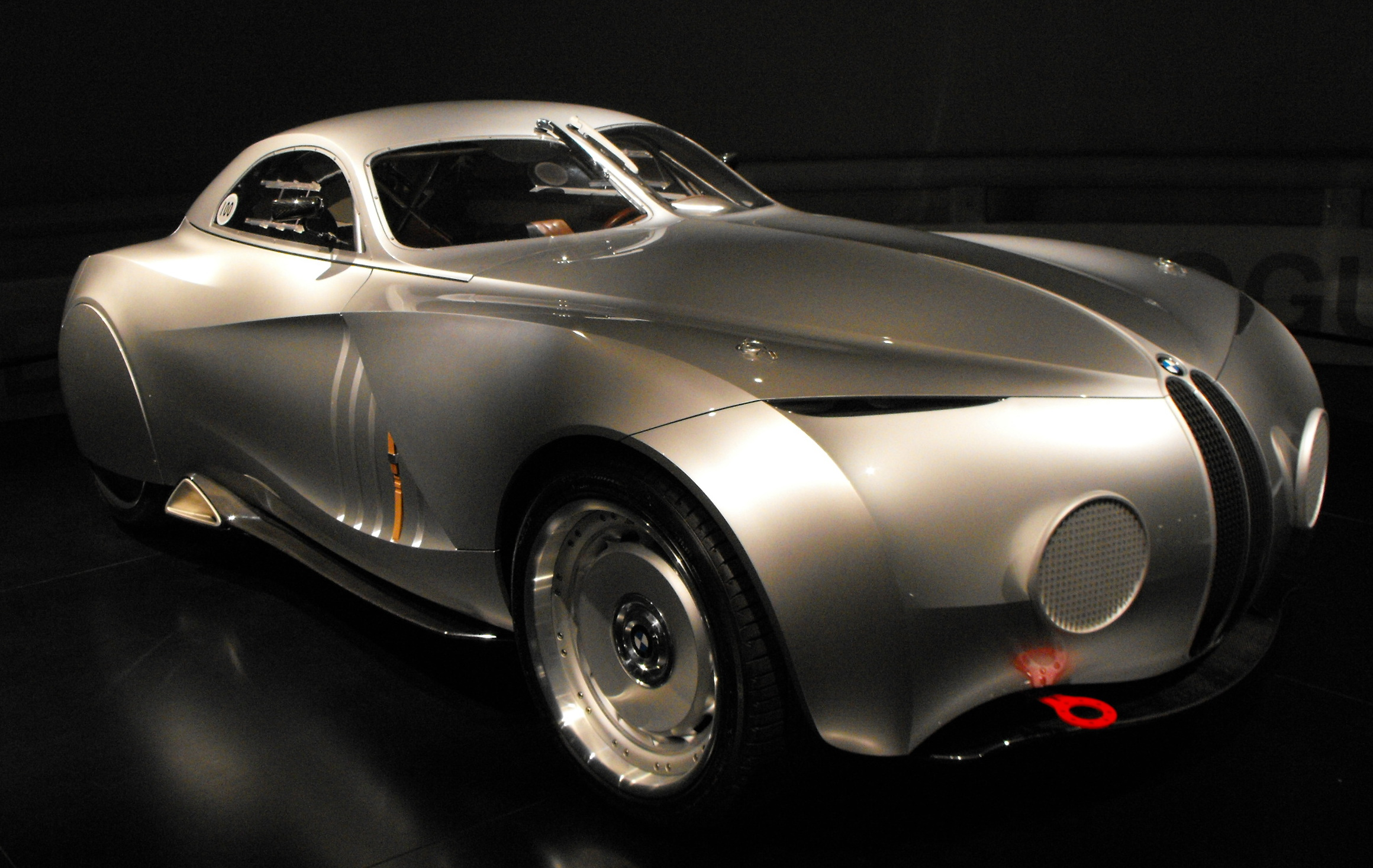
2006 Concept Coupé Mille Miglia at the BMW Museum in Munich

The Concept Coupé Mille Miglia is a concept car inspired by the BMW 328 Mille Miglia Touring Coupé. It was unveiled at the 2006 Mille Miglia rally in Italy.

Using the Z4 M Coupé's mechanical components, the concept car is 23 cm (9 in) longer, 14 cm (6 in) wider but 4 cm (2 in) flatter than the Z4 M Coupé. Other features of the concept car include 20-inch alloy wheels with 245/40R20 tyres, permanently integrated sidewalls, swing-up cockpit, an LED headlight panel, silver-coloured carbon-fibre reinforced plastic body and an interior constructed from stainless steel, untreated cowhides and Lycra fabric.

The vehicle was designed by Anders Warming.

== Model year changes ==
=== 2005 ===
- Four-cylinder model (2.0i) introduced.

=== 2006 facelift or LCI ===
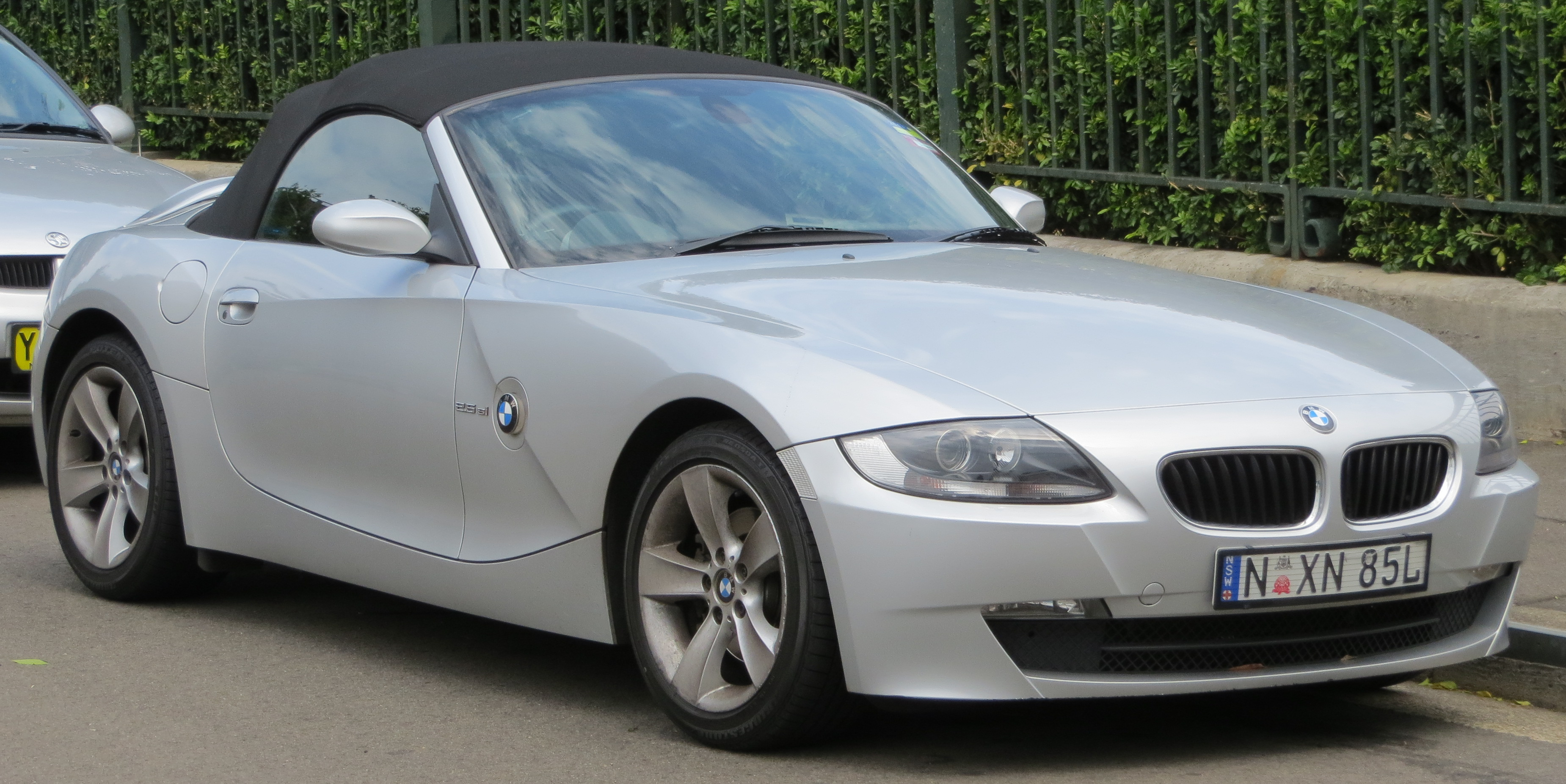

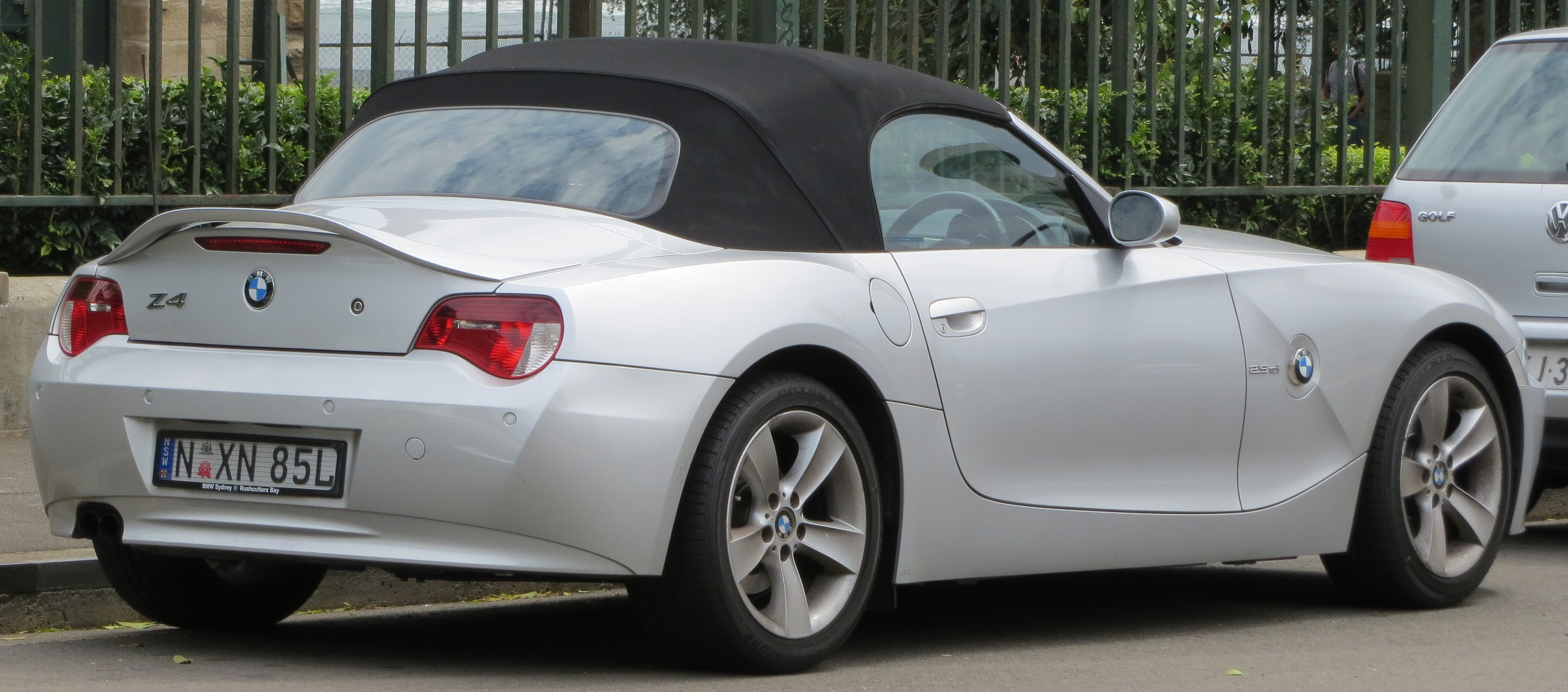
Convertible (facelift)

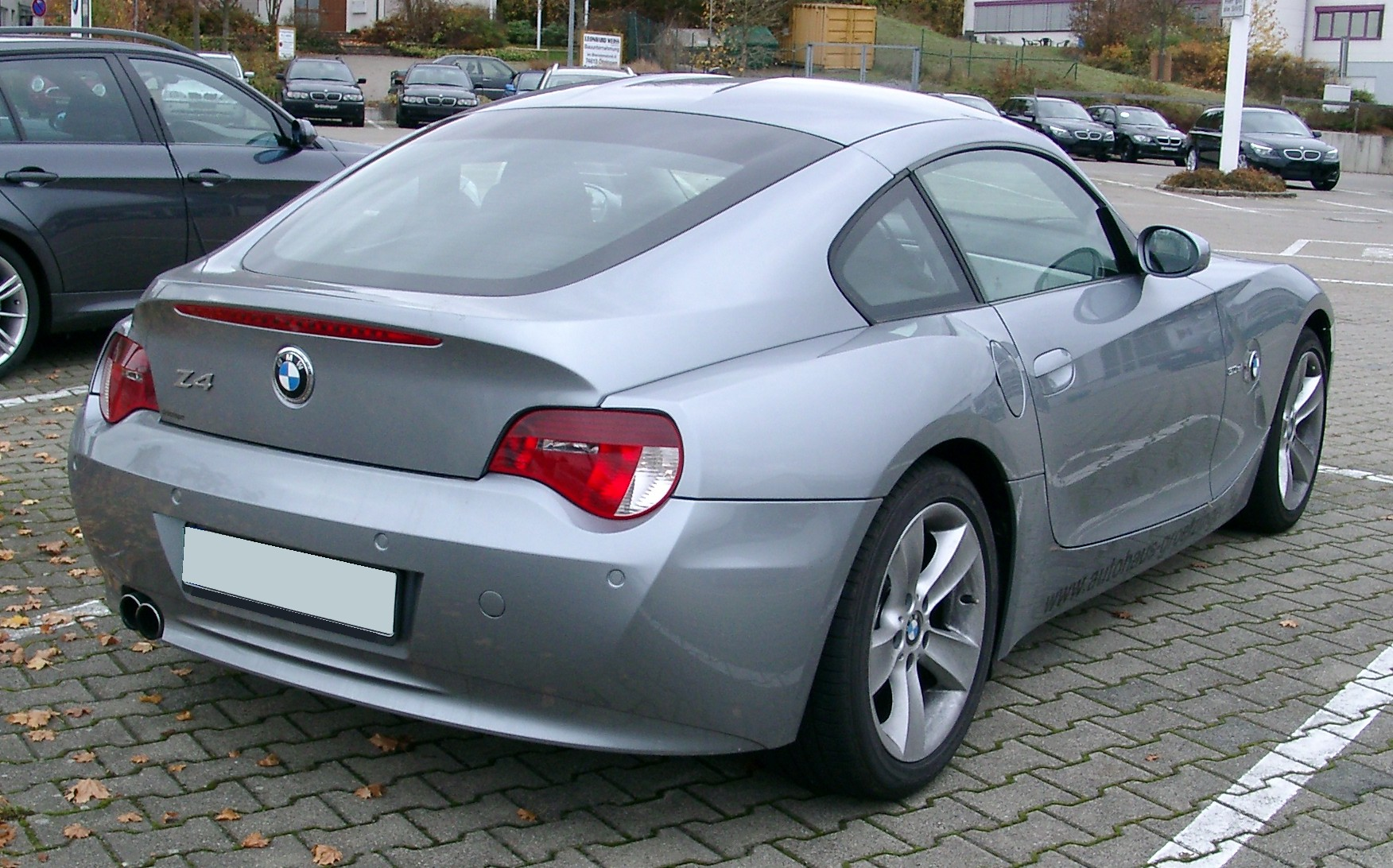
Coupe (facelift)

The Z4 facelift (also known as LCI) models were launched at the 2006 North American International Auto Show in Detroit. The major changes were:

- Introduction of Coupé models.
- Introduction of the M Roadster, powered by the S54 straight-six engine (the M Coupe began production a few months later, in April 2006)
- Discontinuation of the 2.2i model.
- Introduction of "si" models.
- Six-cylinder engines (aside from the M Roadster) upgraded from the M54 to the N52.
- Revised headlights, front bumper and tail lights.
- Availability of the six-speed automatic transmission.
- Inclusion of the six-speed manual transmission as standard equipment on all models.

== Safety ==
ANCAP test results BMW Z4 variant(s) as tested (2003)
| Test | Score |
|---|---|
| Overall | 4 /5 stars |
| Frontal offset | 13.64/16 |
| Side impact | 15.71/16 |
| Pole | Not Assessed |
| Seat belt reminders | 2/3 |
| Whiplash protection | Not Assessed |
| Pedestrian protection | Marginal |
| Electronic stability control | Standard |

== Production ==
Over the Z4's life cycle, 197,950 vehicles had been produced, with 180,856 roadsters and 17,094 coupés.

The last of the first-generation Z4 (Z4 3.0si Roadster in Space Grey) rolled off the production line on 28 August 2008.

=== Roadsters ===
The Z4M Roadster had a total worldwide production of 5,070, including 3,042 cars for the North American market.

=== Coupes ===
The worldwide model breakdown for the E86 Coupe over its life cycle (2006–2008) is 12,819 Z4 3.0si coupés, and 4,275 Z4M coupés. Even from its introduction in 2006, the Coupé was relatively rare: In its first 13 months on the market, the roadster outsold it at a ratio of 7 to 1. For the UK 3.0si coupe model, 1598 cars were produced with a manual transmission and 1998 cars with an automatic transmission.

The North American (United States and Canada) production total for coupe models is 3,919, comprising 1,815 M-Coupes and 2,104 were the 3.0si Coupes. Of the 2,104 3.0si Coupes produced for the North American market, 1,276 were automatics and 828 were manual transmission; the Z4M was only available with a manual transmission.

In North America, the 3.0si coupe was only available for sale in the United States although a number were imported into Canada from the US.

The yearly breakdown of North American market coupe production totals are as follows:

| Year | 3.0si coupes | Z4M Coupes |
|---|---|---|
| 2006 | 348 | 380 |
| 2007 | 1,280 | 1,187 |
| 2008 | 476 | 248 |

== Motorsport ==
=== Endurance racing ===
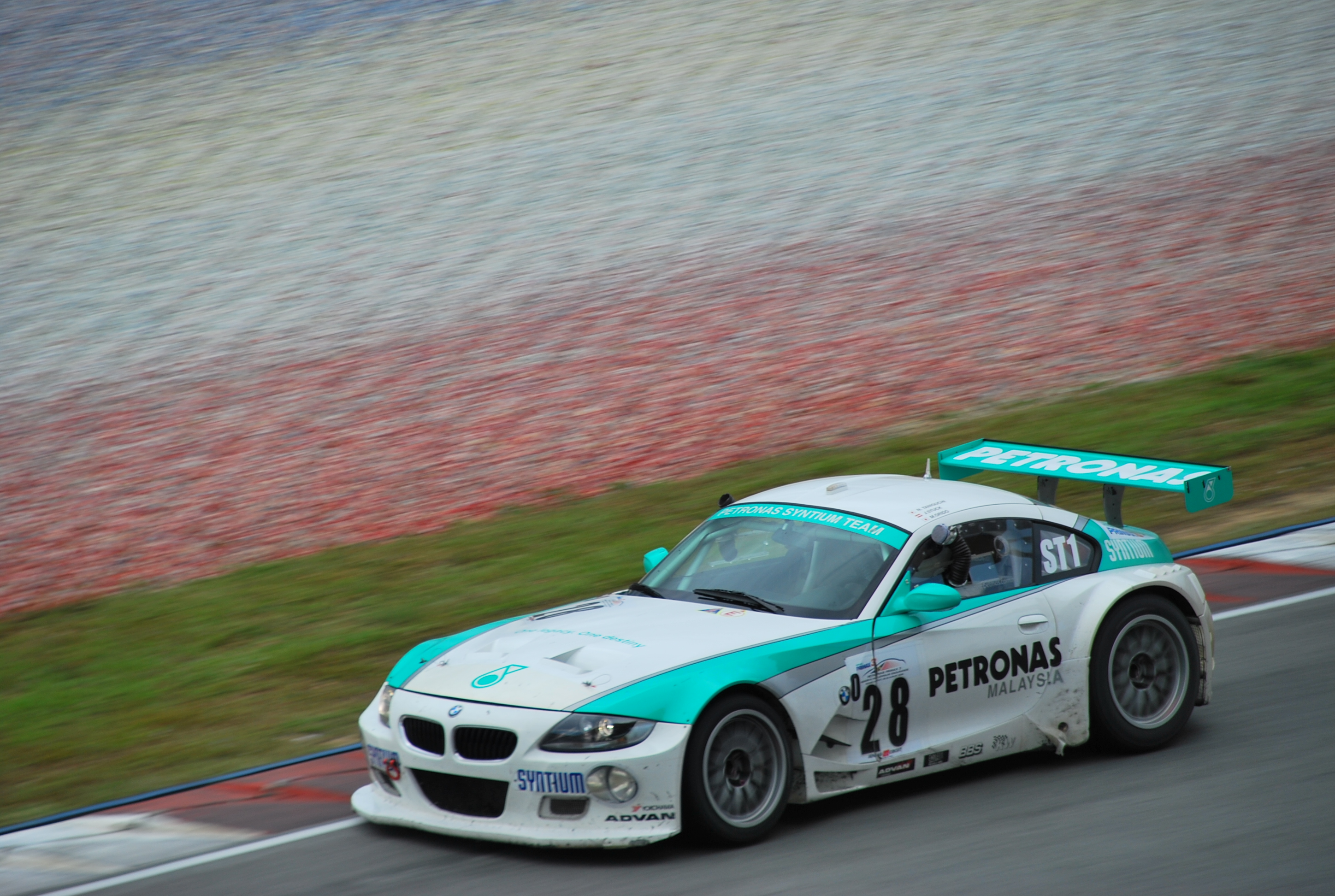
BMW Z4 M Coupé of Petronas Syntium team at the 2008 Merdeka Endurance Race

Dieter Quester, Dirk Werner, Jamie Campell-Walter and Tim Mullen won the Silverstone Britcar 24-Hour race with a BMW Z4 M Coupé. The unit of the racing version is a modified version of the S54B32 3.2-litre straight-six engine, producing approximately 294 kW (394 bhp). The car is made by BMW's M Division and called the Z4 M Coupé Motorsport.

In the 2008 Super Taikyu Endurance Series in Japan, the Petronas Syntium Team entered two Z4M cars. The cars dominated the series by taking first and second at every race, finishing the Super Taikyu 1 class in first and second place to win both the championship and drivers title. The Petronas Syntium Team earned 277 points, compared to the next placed team on 98 points. The cars were driven by established and popular drivers such as Fariqe Hairuman, Nobuteru Taniguchi, Masataka Yanagida, Manabu Orido and father and son pairing of Hans-Joachim Stuck and Johannes Stuck.

=== Super GT ===
In August 2008, a modified Z4 debuted in Round 6 of the Super GT season, marking BMW's return to the series after the M3 was retired from the JGTC series. It was run by the Studie team and participated in the GT300 class. The car was powered by a detuned version of the S62 V8 engine from the E39 M5. The Z4 competed in the 2009 Super GT season (aside from than Sepang Race), and they would replace their H-pattern to a sequential transmission, as well as their S62 Engine with an S65B40 after race 3, after they had suffered an unrepairable engine blow in race 2 at Suzuka. The car was retired at the end of the 2009 season, with its E89 Z4 GT3 successor making its debut in the 2010 season.
