= Anders Warming =

Danish automotive designer (born 1972)

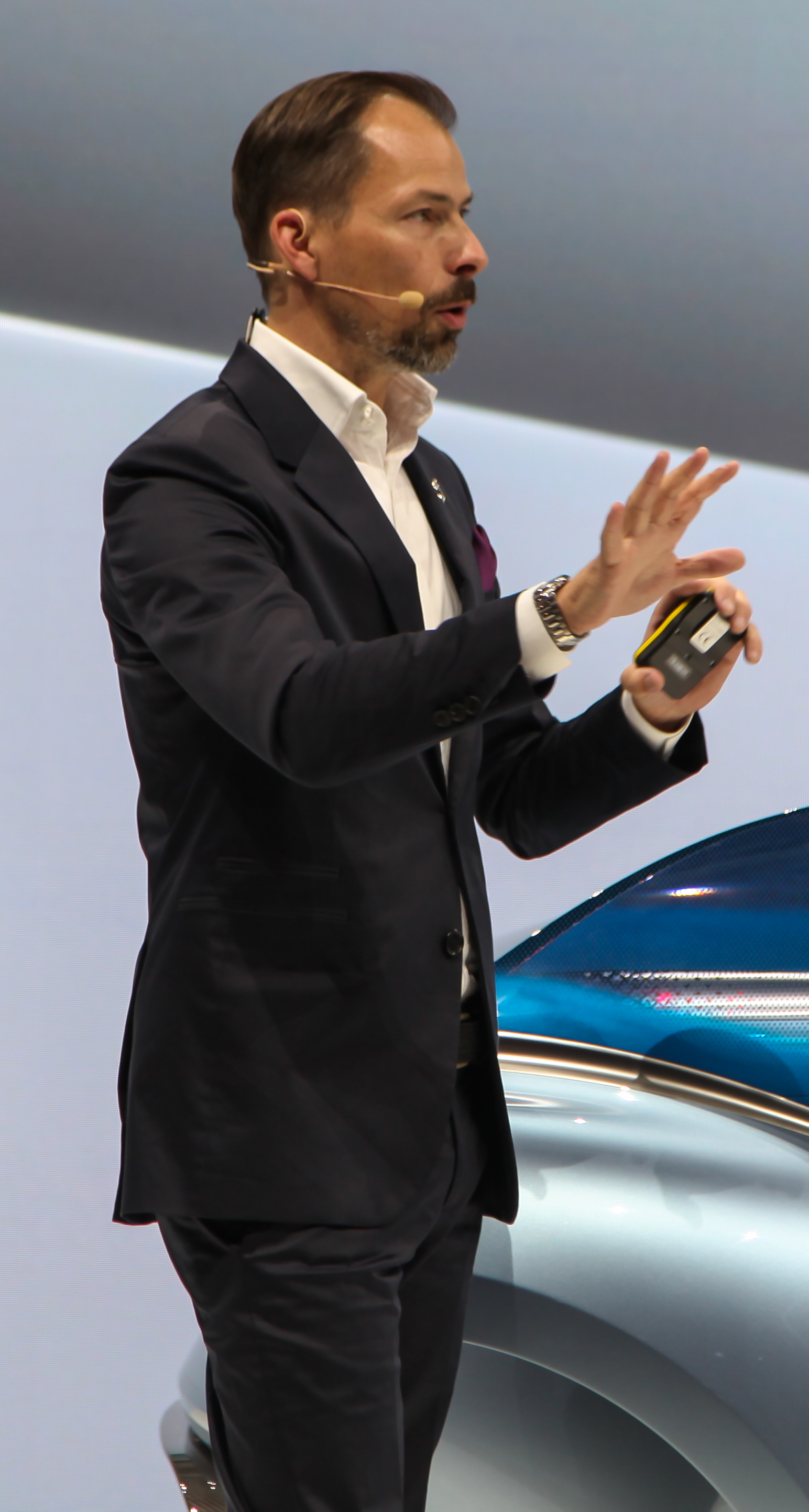
- Born: 1972 (age 53–54)
- Citizenship: Denmark
- Education: Art Centre College of Design Europe, Vevey, Switzerland
- Occupation: Exterior car design
- Known for: Automotive Design

Anders Warming (born 1972) is a Danish automotive designer who is the Director of Design at Rolls-Royce. He started his new job in July 2021. Formerly he has been the Chief Design Officer of Borgward. He was the chief of Design for the Mini division of BMW, but resigned in July 2016. Before working at Mini, he was the chief of exterior design for BMW from 2007 to the end of 2010. After leaving Mini, he joined Borgward and later started his own design firm. In 2020, he was invited to draw Hengchi 1,2 and 4, which the cars going to be produced next year. Hengchi is the brand of China Evergrande New Energy Vehicle Group Limited (a subsidiary of Evergrande Group)

== Biography ==
=== Education and early career ===
Warming studied at Art Centre College of Design Europe, Vevey, Switzerland and also the campus in Pasadena, California. He began his career at the BMW's DesignworksUSA studio in California in 1997.

Warming also had a short tenure at Volkswagen from 2003 to 2005.

He worked at various positions before returning to BMW headquarters in Munich in 2005.

=== Career ===
Warming contributed to the exterior designs of the new second generation iteration of the BMW X3. He also was known for his designs on the new BMW 5 series, Z4, and the new 6 series.

He has worked under Chris Bangle when he was the chief of BMW car design and also worked under Bangle's successor Adrian van Hooydonk. In spring of 2011 Anders Warming became the Chief of Design at BMW Mini.

He then joined Borgward as Chief Design Officer.

As of May 2019, Anders Warming founded his own design studio, Warming Design, based in Munich, Germany. In 2021 he was appointed as the Director of Design at Rolls-Royce [starting July 2021]. On 1 October 2024, he was appointed as the head of Designworks and BMW Group Advanced Design.
