= Designworks =

BMW owned creative consultancy

- Industry: Industrial design, interaction design, automotive design, service design, digital product design, innovation management
- Founded: 1972
- Founder: Chuck Pelly
- Headquarters: Santa Monica, California, United States
- Number of locations: 3
- Key people: Anders Warming (Head of Designworks); Julia de Bono (CEO)
- Number of employees: 140+ (2019)
- Parent: BMW
- Website: www.bmwgroupdesignworks.com

Designworks is a global creative consultancy owned by BMW and based in Santa Monica, California, United States. Designworks has two further studios, in Munich, Germany and Shanghai, China. Established independently in 1972 by Chuck Pelly, it became a wholly owned BMW Group subsidiary in 1995, and was instrumental in the design of the BMW XL Sports Activity Vehicle and the BMW 5 Series. Other development projects at Designworks have included the BMW electric car, BMW 8 Series (E31) seat, BMW 3 Series (E46), BMW Z8, BMW 7 Series interior, and BMW 100- and 1200 Touring motorcycles.

== Origins ==
The design studio was founded in 1972 by designer Charles Pelly with the name DesignworksUSA (renamed Designworks in 2015). The company began in Malibu Canyon with three designers. Early customers included Hyster and the Otis Elevator Company.

In 1978, the company expanded and moved to Van Nuys, and set up its first sister studio, D2, in Detroit. In 1986, Designworks designed the seats for the BMW 8 Series (E31), which was the company's first involvement with BMW. In the same year, the company moved to Agoura. In 1988, Designworks moved to Newbury Park, and began designing for Nokia, Compaq, Siemens and Adidas.

== BMW ownership ==
In 1991, BMW acquired a large percentage of the company, and Designworks started its first car exterior design project in 1993 for the 1998 BMW 3 Series (E46). In May 1995, BMW purchased the remaining percentage of Designworks. At this time artist David Hockney painted an Art Car in the studio. In 1998, Designworks opened a studio in Munich, and in 1999, Henrik Fisker was named president.

In 2001, Adrian van Hooydonk became president. In 2002, Designworks expanded its automotive studio in Newbury Park.

Verena Kloos was president from 2004 to 2009. In January 2006, the company opened a new studio in Singapore, and in 2007 unveiled their new studio wing in Newbury Park. On December 1, 2009, Laurenz Schaffer, formerly director of Designworks's Munich studio, became president. In April 2012, Designworks opened a new studio in Shanghai.

From 1 August 2016 Oliver Heilmer was appointed as the new president of Designworks. He remained in the role until 2017, when he moved to Munich to take over responsibility of Mini Design.

Holger Hampf was appointed to the role of president on 1 September 2017. He remained in the role until 2024, when he moved to Munich to take over responsibility of Mini Design.

The current head of Designworks is Anders Warming. Appointed in the role on 1 October 2024, Anders originally joined Designworks in 1997 as an automotive designer and later held roles at BMW Group Design as the head of MINI and Rolls-Royce.

In addition to work for BMW, Designworks has worked with a range of clients, largely in the mobility/transportation and consumer electronics industries, including Embraer, Hewlett Packard, Starbucks, Coca-Cola, Konica Minolta, EVA Air, Pilatus Aircraft, John Deere, Bavaria Yachtbau, ASUS, and Singapore Airlines.
