= BMW iDrive =

BMW in-car entertainment system

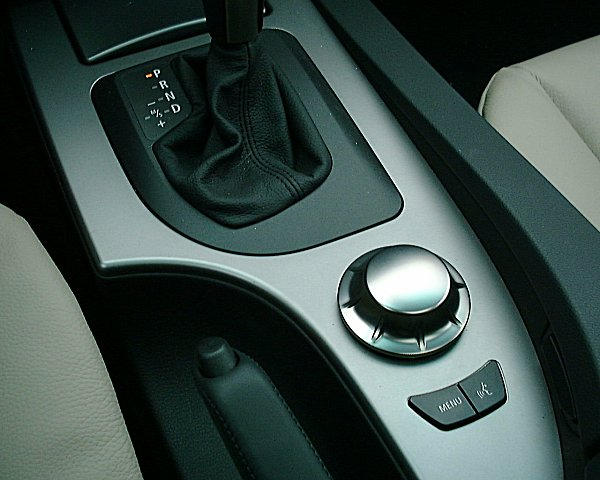
iDrive control knob on the center console.

iDrive is an in-car communications and entertainment system, used to control most secondary vehicle systems in late-model BMW cars. It was launched in 2001, first appearing in the E65 7 Series. The system unifies an array of functions under a single control architecture consisting of an LCD panel mounted on the dashboard and a control knob mounted on the center console.

iDrive introduced the first multiplexed MOST Bus/Byteflight optical fiber data busses with a very high bit rate in a production vehicle. These are used for high-speed applications such as controlling the television, DVD, or driver assistance systems like adaptive cruise control, infrared night vision or head-up display.

iDrive allows the driver (and, in some models, front-seat passengers) to control the climate (air conditioner and heater), audio system (radio and CD player), navigation system, and communication system.

iDrive is also used in modern Rolls-Royce models, as Rolls-Royce is owned by BMW, and in the 2019 onwards Toyota Supra is a collaboration between BMW and Toyota. BMW also owns the Mini brand, and a pared-down version of iDrive is available on those cars, branded as Connected.

== iDrive Generations ==
=== iDrive (1st Gen) ===
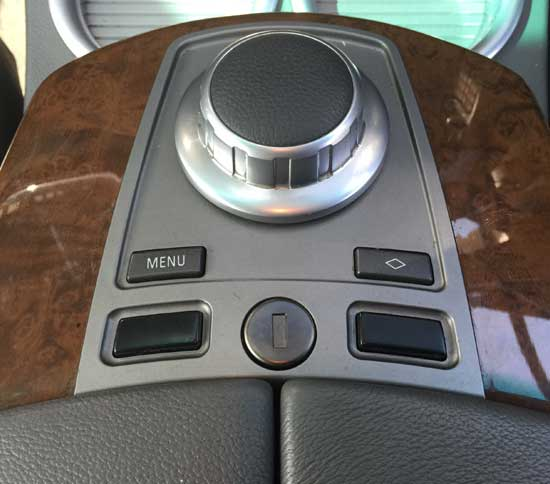
Updated iDrive controller featuring a leather top, menu as well as customization buttons.

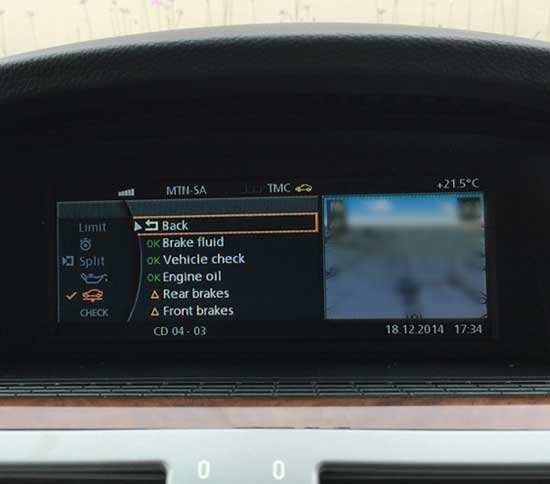
LCI iDrive showing service items.

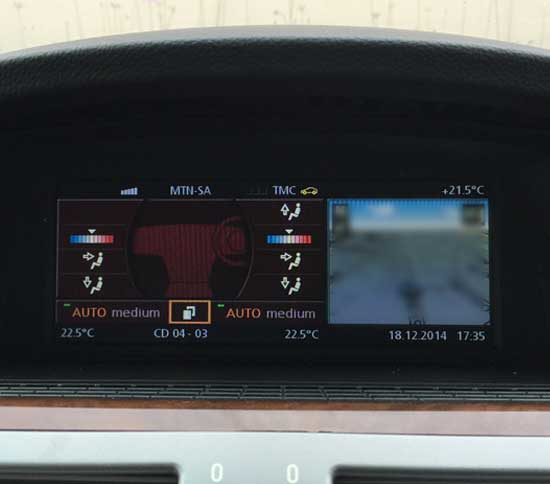
LCI iDrive showing climate menu.

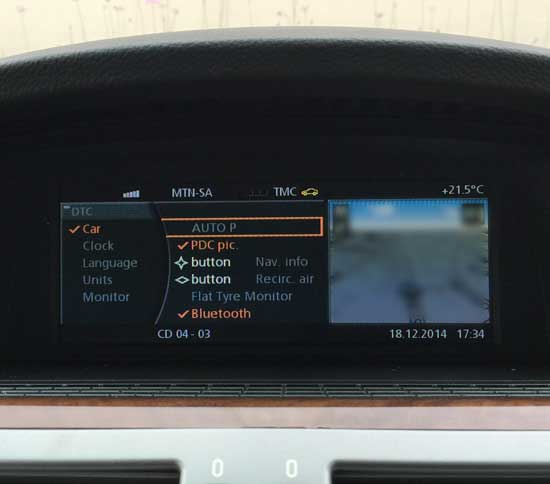
LCI iDrive showing settings menu.

An early prototype iDrive (called the Intuitive Interaction Concept) was featured on the BMW Z9 concept in 1999. The production version debuted in September 2001 in the BMW 7 Series (E65) and was built on the VxWorks kernel while the Navigation computer used Microsoft Windows CE for Automotive; this can be seen when the system reboots or restarts after a software crash, displaying a "Windows CE" logo.

The first generation of iDrive controllers in the 7 Series was equipped with only a rotary knob. The GPS computer ("NAV01", located in the trunk) was only capable of reading map CDs.

In October 2003, a menu and a customizable button was added to the controller. The new GPS computer ("NAV02") was updated to read DVDs, featured a faster processor and the ability to display the map in bird's-eye view ("perspective").

In April 2005, the iDrive controller was changed again, the turn knob having a new leather top. The last hardware update of the GPS unit ("NAV03") got a faster processor again. The map display is antialiased. The 8.8" wide-screen display was updated, having a brighter screen and the ability to control a MP3 capable 6 CD-changer or a BMW iPod Interface. Possible options include a TV tuner, DVD changer, BMW Night Vision, side view camera and a rear view camera.

=== iDrive Business (M-ASK) ===
M-ASK stands for MMI Audio System controller and is manufactured by Becker. This is a limited version of the iDrive computer with a small 6.6" display and is only found on 5, 6 Series and the X5 or X6, without the navigation option.

In addition, it can be ordered as an option in Europe on the 1 Series, 3 Series and 5 series as "Business navigation", which has basic navigation abilities. Early versions of the Business navigation could only display directional arrows, but the latest version can also display 2D maps. iDrive Business Navigation uses a different map DVD than iDrive Professional Navigation. In addition, as only one optical drive is available, one cannot use both navigation and listen to a CD simultaneously.

When iDrive Professional is ordered the M-ASK system is replaced by iDrive CCC Professional with a dual slot dash mounted drive computer and larger 8.8" display.

iDrive Business is available on the following cars;

- iDrive Business Navigation (optional)
  - 1 Series E81/E82/E87/E88
  - 3 Series E90/E91/E92/E93
  - 5 Series E60/E61
- iDrive Business (default when navigation is not ordered)
  - 6 Series E63/E64
  - X5 E70
  - X6 E71

The above list can vary depending on the region.

=== iDrive Professional Navigation (CCC) [iDrive 2.0] ===
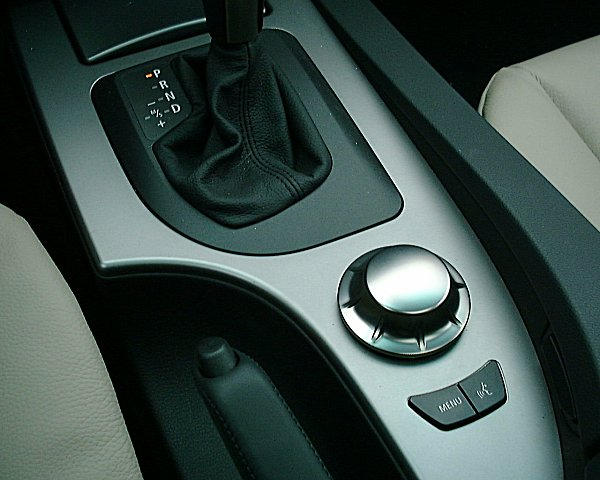
iDrive controller on a BMW 530d (E60 pre-LCI)

It debuted in 2003 with the E60/E61 5 Series and is based on Wind River VxWorks, a real-time operating system. CCC stands for Car Communication Computer and uses a larger 8.8" wide-screen display. It was available on the following cars as an option;

- 1-Series E81/E82/E87/E88 - 06/2004 – 09/2008
- 3-Series E90/E91/E92/E93 - 03/2005 – 09/2008
- 5-Series E60/E61 - 12/2003 – 11/2008
- 6-Series E63/E64 - 12/2003 – 11/2008
- X5 E70 - 03/2007 – 10/2009
- X6 E71 - 05/2008 – 10/2009

CCC based systems use a map DVD from Navteq in a dedicated DVD drive.

==== CCC - Update 1 ====
This is a minor update to iDrive Professional debuted in March 2007. It adds additional programmable buttons in the dashboard to directly access frequent functions and it removes the haptic feedback from the iDrive controller. It is available on the following cars as an option;

- 1 Series E81/E82/E87/E88 manufactured between March 2007 and September 2008
- 3 Series E90/E91/E92/E93 manufactured between March 2007 and August 2008
- 5 Series E60/E61 manufactured between March 2007 and August 2008
- 6 Series E63/E64 manufactured between March 2007 and August 2008
- X5 E70 manufactured until MY2010
- X6 E71

==== CCC - Update 2 ====
This is a minor update debuted in September 2008 for Model Year 2009 cars equipped with iDrive Professional that did not get the new CIC based system. These cars get the new iDrive controller that is also used on cars with CIC. The actual iDrive computer (CCC) remains the same. This update is available on the following cars;

- 5 Series E60/E61 manufactured in September 2008 to February 2009 (to October 2008 for European production)
- 6 Series E63/E64 manufactured in September 2008 to February 2009 (to October 2008 for European production)

=== iDrive Professional Navigation (CIC) [iDrive 3.0] ===
It debuted in September 2008 with F01/F02 7 Series. CIC stands for Car Information Computer and is manufactured by Becker, utilizing the QNX operating system. It is available on the following cars as an option:

- 1-Series E81/E82/E87/E88 - 09/2008 – 08/2013
- 1-Series F20/F21 - 09/2011 – 03/2013
- 3-Series E90/E91/E92/E93 - 09/2008 – 10/2013
- 3-Series F30/F31/F34/F80 - 02/2012 – 11/2012
- 5-Series E60/E61 - 11/2008 – 05/2010
- 5-Series F07 - 10/2009 – 07/2012
- 5-Series F10 - 03/2010 – 09/2012
- 5-Series F11 - 09/2010 – 09/2012
- 6-Series E63/E64 - 11/2008 – 07/2010
- 6-Series F06 - 03/2012 – 03/2013
- 6-Series F12/F13 - 12/2010 – 03/2013
- 7-Series F01/F02/F03 - 11/2008 – 07/2013
- 7-Series F04 - 11/2008 – 06/2015
- X1 E84 - 10/2009 – 06/2015
- X3 F25 - 10/2010 – 04/2013
- X5 E70 - 10/2009 – 06/2013
- X6 E71 - 10/2009 – 08/2014
- Z4 E89 - 02/2009 – 08/2016

The CIC system is a major update to iDrive, replacing the display, computer and the controller. The display is of a higher resolution, and is generally more responsive than CCC, to address one of the common complaints of iDrive. Internet access is also supported.

CIC-based systems use maps from TeleAtlas that are installed on an internal 2.5" 80 GB Hard Disk Drive (HDD). This HDD can also store up to 8 GB of music files for playback. For facilitating the uploading of music files to the HDD, a USB port is provided in the glove box.

Following 2009 LCI production, all CIC-based iDrive systems support DVD video. This, however, is only operational when the vehicle is in the "Park" position for automatic transmissions, or while the parking brake is set for vehicles that have a manual transmission. DVD audio will continue to play while driving.

=== iDrive Professional NBT (Next Big Thing) [iDrive 4.0] ===
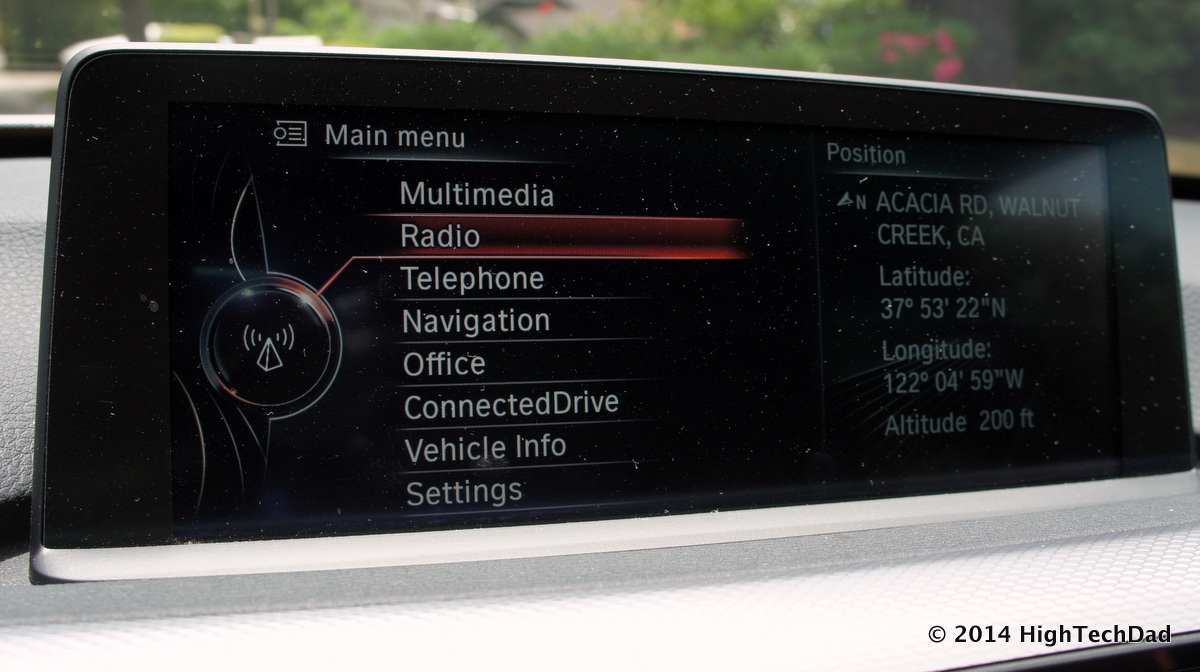
iDrive NBT

BMW introduced a further update to the iDrive Professional System in early 2012, calling it the "Next Big Thing" (NBT). It was introduced in current generation cars as an option, including:

- 1-Series F20/F21 - 03/2013 – 03/2015
- 2-Series F22 - 11/2013 – 03/2015
- 3-Series F30/F31 - 11/2012 – 07/2015
- 3-Series F34 - 03/2013 – 07/2015
- 3-Series F80 - 03/2014 – 07/2015
- 4-Series F32 - 07/2013 – 07/2015
- 4-Series F33 - 11/2013 – 07/2015
- 4-Series F36 - 03/2014 – 07/2015
- 5-Series F07 - 07/2012 – 2016
- 5-Series F10/F11/F18 - 09/2012 – 2016
- 6-Series F06/F12/F13 - 03/2013 – 2016
- 7-Series F01/F02/F03 - 07/2012 – 06/2015
- X3 F25 - 04/2013 – 08/2017
- X4 F26 - 04/2014 – 08/2017
- X5 F15 - 08/2014 – 07/2016
- X5 F85 - 12/2014 – 07/2016
- X6 F16 - 08/2014 – 07/2016
- X6 F86 - 12/2014 – 07/2016
- i3 - 09/2013 – 09/2017
- i8 - 04/2014 – 09/2017

The update includes extensive hardware and software changes including cosmetic enhancements, faster processor, more memory, detailed 3D maps and improved routing. In addition, the capacity of the internal HDD has been increased from 10GB to 20GB. NBT also introduced a redesigned iDrive controller with optional handwriting recognition capabilities and gesture controls. This was achieved through a capacitive touch pad on top of the iDrive controller. NBT also removed the need for a separate COMBOX module for A2DP and USB media as those functions were integrated directly into the NBT Head Unit. BMW Online was also replaced with the newly introduced Connected Drive, which relied on a hardware TCB module with a built-in SIM card for mobile connectivity.

=== iDrive Professional NBT EVO [iDrive 5.0/6.0] ===
NBT EVO (Evolution) was released starting in 2016 and represented the first major change in the operational logic of iDrive since being introduced in 2001. The familiar vertical list of text menus was replaced by a horizontal set of dynamic tiles, each able to show real time information. This update saw major updates to the iDrive hardware, including the ability to interact with the system via touch screen for the first time. BMW's Connected Drive services were further enhanced with this upgrade to the iDrive system, and the TCB module was replaced with a newer, faster ATM module. NBT EVO also introduced basic gesture controls as an optional extra on select BMW models.

Three Interface options exist for NBT EVO. ID4 looks like CIC NBT while ID5 and ID6 feature the new horizontal tile interface.

NBT EVO was available on the following BMW Models:

- 1-Series F20/F21 - 03/2015 – 2019
- 2-Series F22 - 03/2015 – 2021
- 2-Series F23 - 11/2014 – 2021
- 3-Series F30/F31/F34/F80 - 07/2015 – 2018
- 3-Series G20 - 2019 - 2022 (base system, when no Live Cockpit Plus or Professional is equipped)
- 4-Series F32/F33/F36 - 07/2015 – 2019
- 5-Series G30 - 10/2016 – 2019
- 6-Series F06/F12/F13 - 03/2013 – 2018
- 6-Series G32 - 07/2017 – 2018
- 7-Series G12 - 07/2015 – 2019
- X1 F48 - 06/2015 – 06/2022
- X2 F39 - 11/2017 – 10/2022
- X3 F25 - 03/2016 – 2017
- X3 G01 - 11/2017 – 2024
- X4 F26 - 03/2016 – 2018
- X5 F15/F85 - 07/2016 – 2018
- X6 F16/F86 - 07/2016 – 2019
- i3 (ID6.0) 09/2017–07/2022
- i8 (ID6.0) 09/2018- 2020

=== BMW Live Cockpit series [iDrive 7.0] ===
BMW debuted iDrive 7.0 in the summer of 2018, first appearing in BMW X5 (G05),BMW 8 Series (G15),BMW Z4 (G29) and BMW 3 Series (G20).

iDrive consists of the MGU hardware (Media Graphics Unit) running the 7th generation of iDrive called BMW Operating System 7.0.

Two Live Cockpit configurations are available: Live Cockpit Plus and Live Cockpit Professional. The Live Cockpit Plus system uses a hybrid analog/digital instrument cluster with a 5.7-inch Driver's Information Display and an 8.8-inch main display. In the Live Cockpit Professional System these are upgraded to a 12.3-inch digital instrument cluster and a 10.25-inch main display.

The interface was redesigned once again, with the instrument cluster now being fully digital (it no longer replicates circular gauges but is replaced by a more "arced" design).

iDrive 7.0 is available on the following BMW models:

- BMW 1 Series (F40)
- BMW 2 Series (F44)
- BMW 3 Series (G20)
- BMW 4 Series (G22)
- BMW 5 Series (G30)
- BMW 6 Series (G32)
- BMW 7 Series (G11)
- BMW 8 Series (G15)
- BMW X3 (G01)
- BMW iX3 (G08)
- BMW X4 (G02)
- BMW X5 (G05)
- BMW X6 (G06)
- BMW X7 (G07)
- BMW Z4 (G29)

=== BMW Curved Display [iDrive 8.0] ===
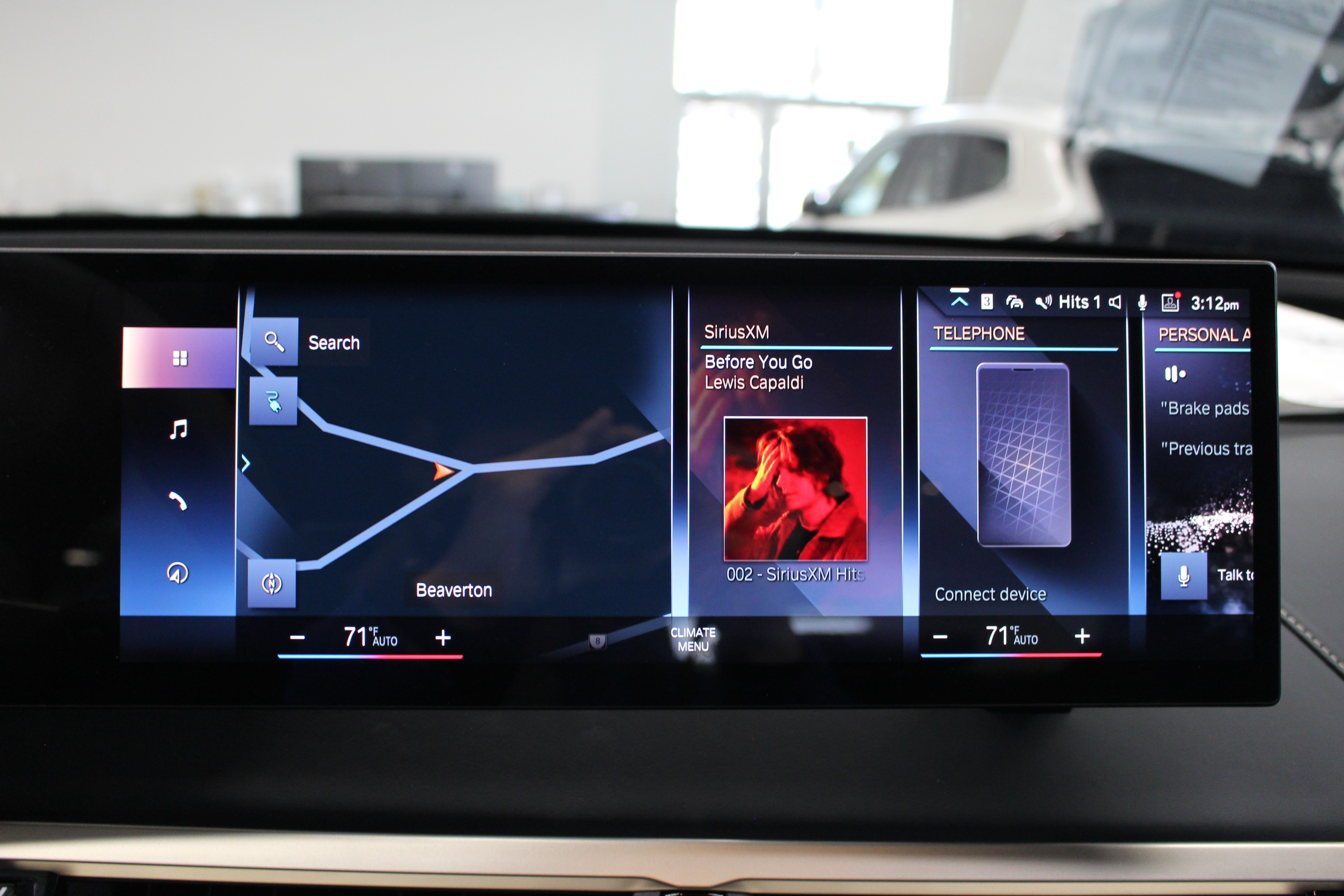
BMW iDrive 8 in BMW iX M60 (I20)

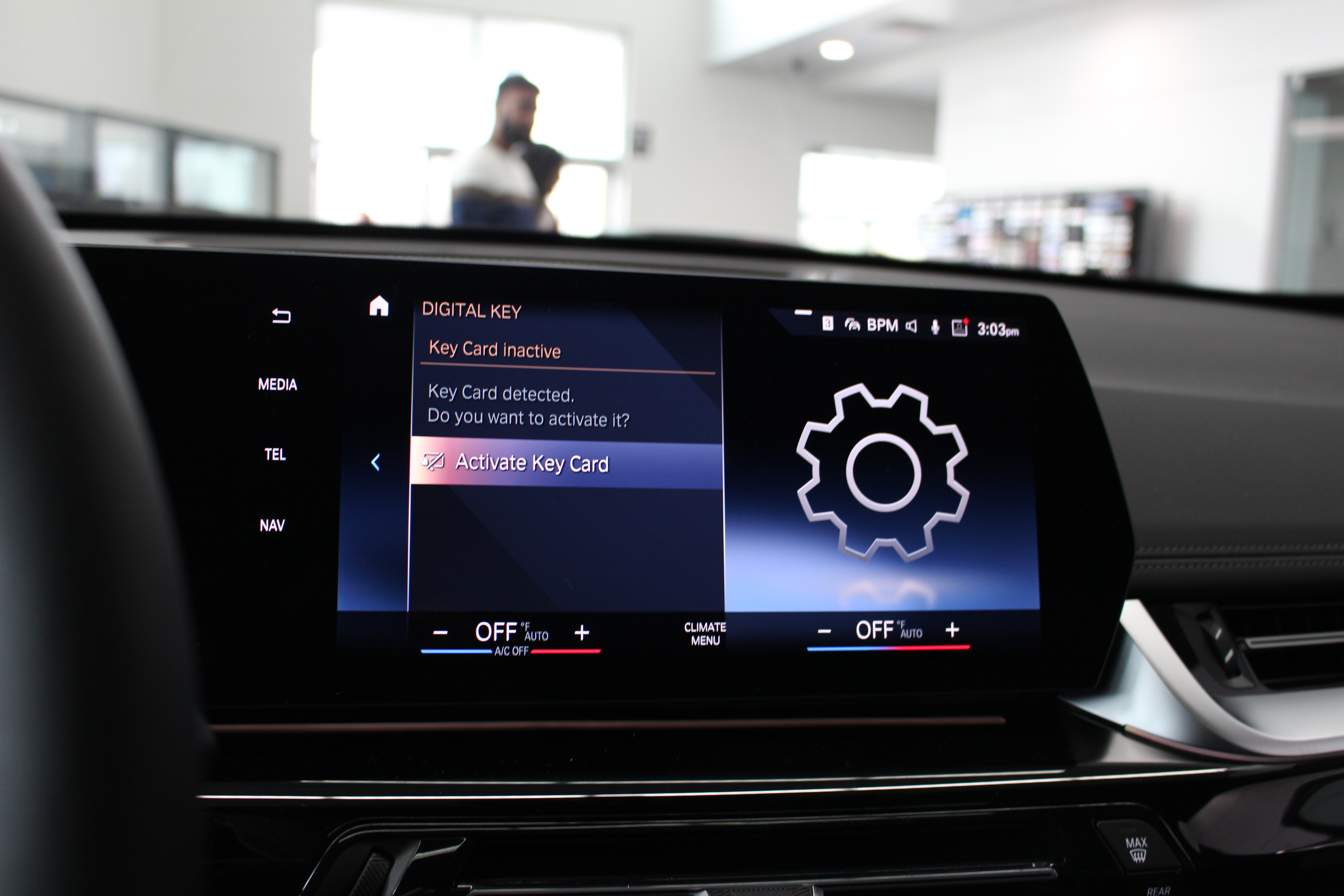
BMW iDrive 8 in BMW X1 (U11)

BMW unveiled the 8th generation of iDrive in 2021 with BMW Curved Display. The first model to ship with iDrive 8 onboard was BMW iX, with i4 following shortly after.

BMW iDrive 8 introduced BMW Curved Display, which consists of 12.3" digital instrument cluster and 14.9" control display merged into a single unit, the displays are housed behind anti reflective glass. the 14.9" display can be used to control vehicle functions such as Climate Control and Head-up Display.

iDrive 8 brought 5G networks support, Widgets, Improved Head-Up Display, Video Streaming and further improvements to BMW Intelligent Virtual Assistant and Gesture Control.

BMW iDrive 8 faced criticism mainly for its interface design, HUD graphics, Voice Assistant struggling to understand basic voice commands, and most importantly for lack of physical buttons for climate control and things like heated seats, with them being integrated into a menu in the iDrive system itself.

iDrive 8.0 is available on the following BMW models:

- BMW 1 Series (F70)
- BMW 2 Series Active Tourer (U06)
- BMW 2 Series Coupé (G42) (after summer 2022)
- BMW 3 Series (G20 facelift)
- BMW 5 Series (G60)
- BMW 7 Series (G70)
- BMW iX1
- BMW i4
- BMW iX
- BMW XM
- BMW X1 (U11) (2023)
- BMW X5 (G05 facelift)
- BMW X6 (G06 facelift)
- BMW X7 (G07 facelift)

=== BMW Operating System 9 [iDrive 9.0] ===
BMW introduced iDrive 9 in November 2023, starting with mainly compact models, like the BMW X1 and 2 Series, with later rollout to X2 and 1 Series. iDrive 9 is based on Android OS and is built on Android Open Source Platform (AOSP).

iDrive 9 features new user interface, redesigned menu structure, which is more intuitive than iDrive 8, deeper integration with apps and services, and improved overall system performance. On most models, iDrive 9 got rid of the iconic rotary knob, making the system touchscreen only.

iDrive 9 is a system intended for lower-end BMW vehicles, being the reason for the removal of the rotary knob.

iDrive 9.0 is available on the following BMW models:

- BMW X1 (U11) (2024-)
- BMW X2 (U10) (2024-)
- BMW X3 (G45) (2025-)
- BMW 1 Series (F70) (2024-)
- BMW 2 Series Active Tourer (U06) (2024-)
- BMW 2 Series Gran Coupé (2025-)

== Rationale ==
The design rationale of iDrive is to replace an array of controls for the above systems with an all-in-one unit. The controls necessary for vehicle control and safety, such as the headlights and turn signals, are still located in the immediate vicinity of the steering column. Since, in the rationale of the designers, the air conditioning, car audio, navigation and communication controls are not used equally often, they have been moved into a central location.

The iDrive M-ASK and CCC systems were based around the points of a compass (north, south, east, west) with each direction corresponding with a specific area. These areas are also colour-coded providing identification as to which part of the system is currently being viewed.

- North (blue) for communication
- East (green) for navigation (In some models without navigation, this option is replaced by the On Board Computer)
- South (brown) for entertainment
- West (red) for climate control

Starting in 2007, iDrive added programmable buttons (6 USA/Japan, 8 in Europe) to the dashboard, breaking tradition of having the entire system operated via the control knob. Each button can be programmed to instantly access any feature within iDrive (such as a particular navigation route, or one's favorite radio station). In addition, a dedicated AM/FM button, and a Mode button (to switch between entertainment sources) were added for North American-market vehicles.

Older versions of iDrive used a widescreen display that was split into a 2/3 main window, and 1/3 "Assistance Window". This allowed the driver to use a function or menu, while simultaneously maintaining secondary information. For example, if the driver was not in the Navigation menu, they could still see a map on the assistance window. Other information that could be displayed included navigation route directions and a trip computer.

== Controversy ==
iDrive caused significant controversy among users, the automotive media, and critics when it was first introduced. Many reviewers of BMW vehicles in automobile magazines disapproved of the system. Criticisms of iDrive included its steep learning curve and its tendency to cause the driver to look away from the road too much. Most users report that they adapt to the system after about one year of practice, and the advent of voice controls has reduced the learning curve greatly.

A new iDrive system (CIC) was introduced in September 2008 to address most of the complaints.

iDrive NBT, introduced in 2012, brought further improvements, but still faced criticism due to its complexity and frequent software issues such as: freezing, frequent system crashes and sometimes the system not booting at all.

In July 2026, BMW introduced an in-car advertisement for the upcoming film, Spider-Man: Brand New Day. Tapping on the ad would trigger a full-screen animation with music and lighting effects on equipped models. This generated controversy amongst BMW owners as the company had promised in 2023 not to use the infotainment system for advertising purposes.
