= BMW Z9 =

Concept car designed by Adrian van Hooydonk

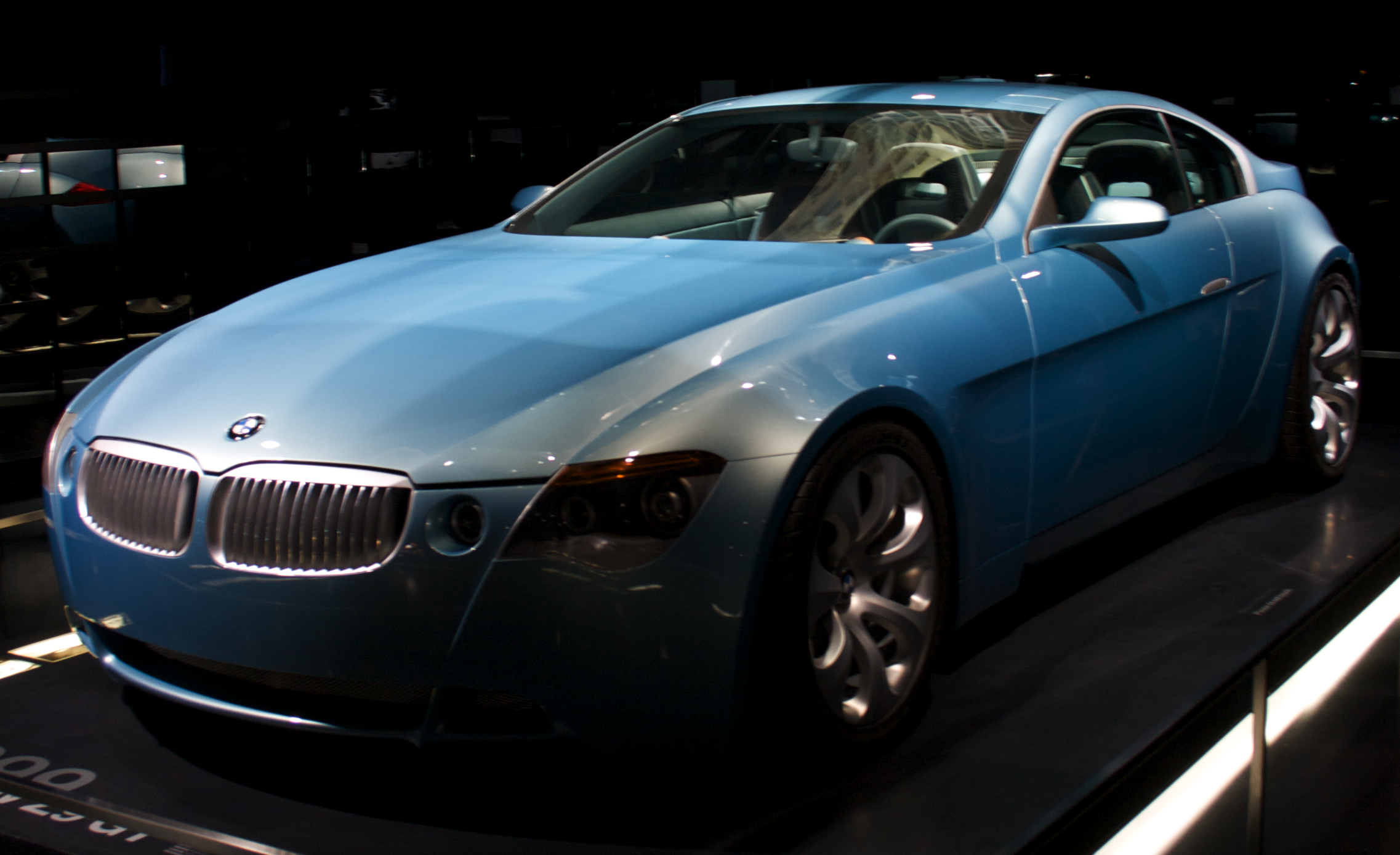
BMW Z9

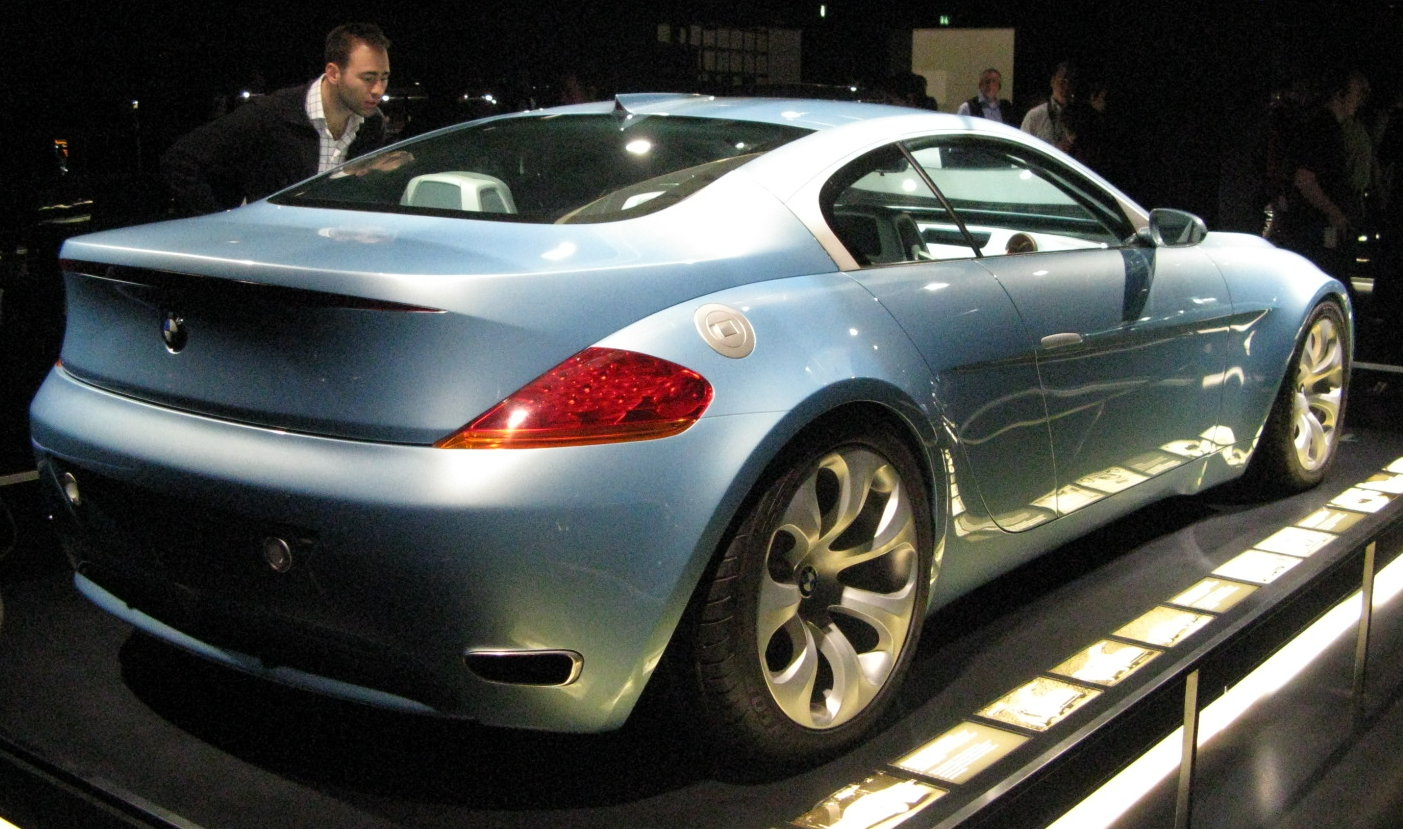
Rear view

The BMW Z9 (or Z9 Gran Turismo, Z9 GT) is a four-seat coupe concept car with a body made from a carbon-fiber skin over an aluminum space frame. It was introduced in September 1999 at the Frankfurt Auto Show. At the 2000 Paris Auto Show, a convertible variant of the Z9 was debuted. It was designed by Adrian van Hooydonk under manage of Chris Bangle, who was promoted to Director of BMW Group Design. The Z9’s design heavily inspired the design of the E63 6 Series.

== Interior ==
A large, 8.8-inch monitor in the center of the dashboard displays all the information the driver needs, apart from the speedometer and tachometer, which are conventional analog instruments. The monitor is positioned within the driver's field of vision, allowing it to be viewed while focusing attention on the road ahead. Controls are operated with a single large, multifunction knob located between the front seats. The control (called the Intuitive Interaction Concept) consists of a combination rotary and push button for selecting functions. Confirmation of the selected mode is displayed on the dash mounted screen. Several hundred functions can be controlled with this device. The concept of operating the Z9, which BMW calls Intuitive Interaction Concept, allows the driver to easily activate functions while driving without the need to constantly examine and manipulate conventional controls. It was an early prototype of the series production iDrive, introduced in 2001 on the BMW 7 Series (E65).

The Z9 has only a starter button and light switch on the dashboard. An electronic key is used to activate the driver's controls. Then, a simple starter button starts the engine. The instrument panel folds out when started. Classical music then plays and a circular dial emerges to provides feedback to the driver. Drive or reverse gears can be engaged with a dash mounted lever. The Steptronic transmission can also be operated with steering wheel mounted buttons. These buttons can be used for manually shifting gears.

== Exterior ==
The Z9 Gran Turismo features the long hood and short rear deck that have become hallmarks of BMW sport coupe design. The “face” of the Z9 incorporated trademark BMW design elements, such as the dual round headlights flanking the central kidney grille. The wheels of the Z9 measure 20-inches in the front and 21 inches in the rear. Front and rear turn signals featured neon light technology, while rear lights incorporated light-emitting diodes (LED).

Notably, the Z9 features gull-wing doors, which are long enough to provide access to both the front and rear seats. Unusually, though, the doors are split into two parts, with the other part being hinged conventionally, allowing the doors to be opened either upwards or conventionally outwards. The full-length gull wing doors can be opened automatically at the press of a button on the electronic key. Depressing the button on the remote control will both open and close a door.

== Engine ==
The Z9 featured a 3.9L turbo diesel BMW M67 V8, from the BMW 7 Series (E38) 740d model. The V8 is a common rail, direct injection unit which produces 241 hp; 245 PS (180 kW) and 413 lb⋅ft (560 N⋅m) of torque. Torque is maintained constantly between 1750 and 2500 rpm to give high performance even at the low end of the rev range.
