= BMW 7 Series (E65) =

BMW 7 Series (E65/E66)
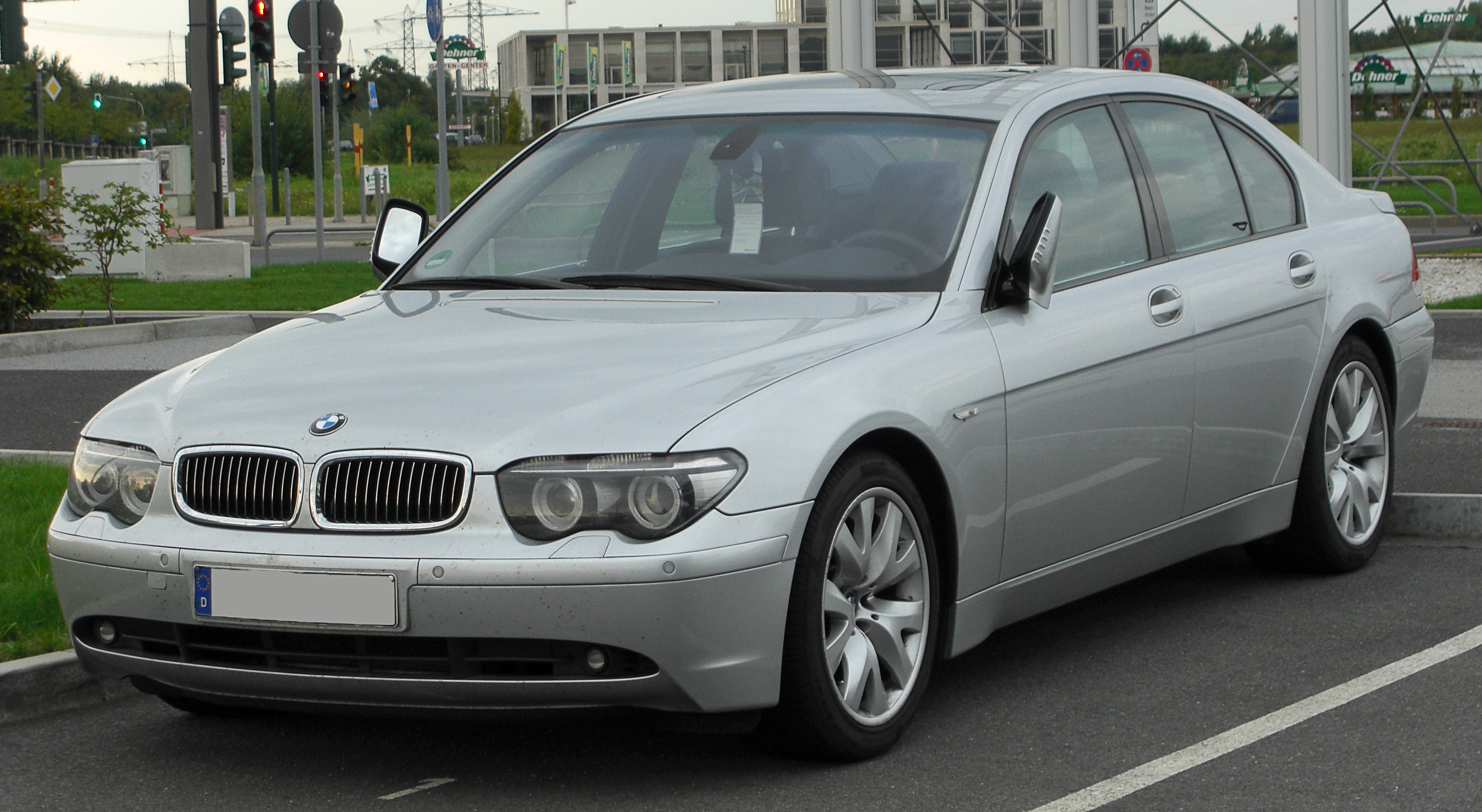

Overview
- Manufacturer: BMW
- Model code: E65 (short-wheelbase); E66 (long-wheelbase); E67 (high-security); E68 (Hydrogen 7)
- Production: July 2001–2008
- Model years: 2002–2008
- Assembly: Germany: Dingolfing
- Designer: Adrian van Hooydonk, Chris Bangle

Body and chassis
- Class: Full-size luxury car (F)
- Body style: 4-door sedan
- Layout: Rear-wheel drive
- Related: Alpina B7 (E65)

Powertrain
- Engine: Petrol: 3.0 L M54/N52 I6; 3.6–4.8 L N62 V8; 6.0 L N73 V12; Diesel: 3.0 L M57 I6 turbo; 3.9–4.4 L M67 V8 twin-turbo
- Transmission: 6-speed automatic

Dimensions
- Wheelbase: 2,990 mm (117.7 in) (E65); 3,130 mm (123.2 in) (E66)
- Length: 5,029 mm (198.0 in) (E65); 5,169 mm (203.5 in) (E66)
- Width: 1,902 mm (74.9 in)
- Height: 1,484–1,492 mm (58.4–58.7 in)
- Curb weight: 1,710–2,040 kg (3,770–4,497 lb)

Chronology
- Predecessor: BMW 7 Series (E38)
- Successor: BMW 7 Series (F01)

The fourth generation of the BMW 7 Series consists of the BMW E65 and BMW E66 luxury cars. The E65/E66 was produced from 2001 to 2008 and is often collectively referred to as the E65. The E65 replaced the E38 7 Series and was produced with petrol and turbo-diesel straight-six and V8 engines, along with a petrol V12 flagship model.

The E65 was the first BMW vehicle to include the iDrive infotainment system, and the exterior styling (overseen by Chris Bangle) marked a significant departure from traditional BMW styling. Other new features included active anti-roll bars, a six-speed automatic transmission, an electronic Smart Key (dispensing with the traditional metallic key), and night vision. The 760i model also utilised the world's first production V12 engine to use direct injection.

In late 2008, the E65 7 Series was replaced by the F01 7 Series.

== Development and launch ==
Development for the BMW E65 7 Series began in early 1996. In early 1997, Chris Bangle delivered a brief to BMW's Munich and DesignworksUSA studios. After a competition between 20 designers, Adrian van Hooydonk's design was approved in the spring of 1998. Production specifications were frozen in January 1999 and took 34 months from freeze to market launch. The design was patented on 16 November 2000 and development ended in early 2001.

The E65 was introduced at the Frankfurt Auto Show in September 2001, and launched in Germany in November 2001. In order to produce the E65 7 Series and other future models, the BMW Dingolfing plant was retooled at a cost of approximately €500 million.

== Design ==
=== Exterior styling ===
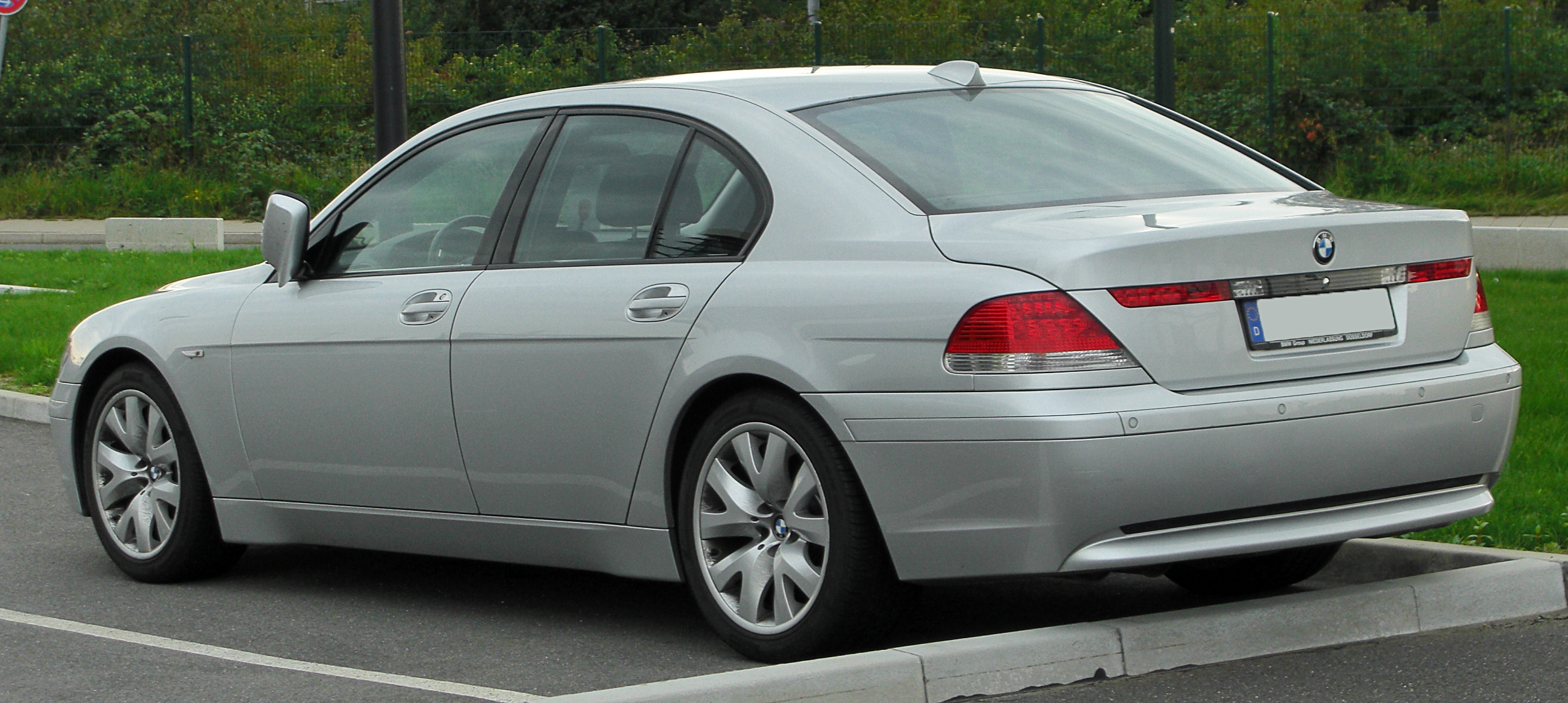
E65 short-wheelbase rear view (Germany)

Under the direction of Chris Bangle, BMW's Design Chief at the time, the BMW E65 7 Series saw a departure from traditional BMW exterior styling.

BMW's board of directors were keen to move the company's image into the future, and the initial styling sketches from 1998 by Adrian van Hooydonk were of a fastback body style - even more radical than the eventual production model. The controversial "flame surfacing" design greatly contrasted the conservative lines of its E38 predecessor. The rear end styling was nicknamed "Bangle Butt" by critics, due to the elongated rear bootlid. However, many believe that the controversial styling helped the 7 series look modern even after many years.

Dimensionally the E65 7 Series is 45 mm (1.8 in) longer, 38 mm (1.5 in) wider and 60 mm (2.4 in) taller than the E38. The wheelbase is 2,990 mm (117.7 in), an increase of 60 mm (2.4 in) over the outgoing model. Despite these increased dimensions, the E65 7 Series is only 15 kg (33 lb) heavier than the E38.

=== Interior styling ===
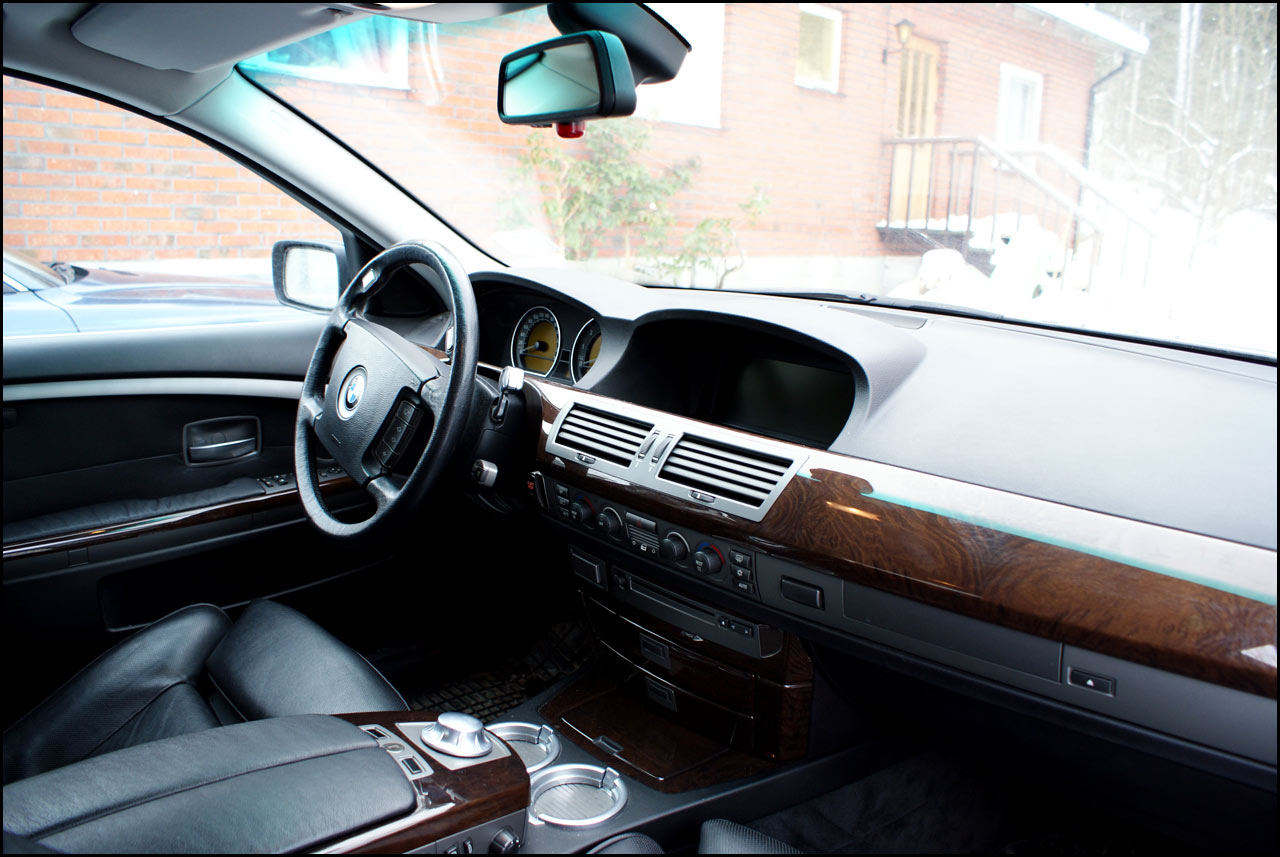
Interior

The E65 contained many departures from automotive interior design conventions. BMW removed the traditional console mounted gear selector, replacing it with a steering-column mounted stalk in favour of two cup holders. The e-brake is controlled using a button on the dashboard. The seat adjustment controls were moved from their traditional place on the side of the seat base to the inside of the raised central console, which drew some criticisms. Unlike most BMWs since 1975 (including the E65's predecessor and successor), the centre instrument panel is not angled toward the driver.

== Engines ==
The V8 models were the first to use the then-new BMW N62 V8 engine, which was the world's first engine to use a continuously variable-length intake manifold. It was also BMW's first V8 engine to use variable valve lift (Valvetronic), replacing throttle butterflies for added response, efficiency and power. A system using traditional throttle butterflies was also present as a backup in case of faults in the Valvetronic system.

=== Petrol ===
Model	Engine	Years	Power	Torque	0–100 km/h (0–62 mph)
730i	M54B30; 3.0 L I6	2004–2005	170 kW (231 PS; 228 hp) at 5,900 rpm	300 N⋅m (221 lb⋅ft) at 3,500 rpm	8.1 s
730i	N52B30; 3.0 L I6	2005–2008	190 kW (258 PS; 255 hp) at 6,600 rpm	300 N⋅m (221 lb⋅ft) at 2,500–4,000 rpm	7.8 s
735i	N62B36; 3.6 L V8	2001–2005	200 kW (272 PS; 268 hp) at 6,200 rpm	360 N⋅m (266 lb⋅ft) at 3,700 rpm	7.5 s
740i	N62B40; 4.0 L V8	2005–2008	225 kW (306 PS; 302 hp) at 6,300 rpm	390 N⋅m (288 lb⋅ft) at 3,500 rpm	6.8 s
745i	N62B44; 4.4 L V8	2001–2005	245 kW (333 PS; 329 hp) at 6,100 rpm	450 N⋅m (332 lb⋅ft) at 3,600 rpm	6.3 s
750i	N62B48; 4.8 L V8	2005–2008	270 kW (367 PS; 362 hp) at 6,300 rpm	490 N⋅m (361 lb⋅ft) at 3,400 rpm	5.9 s
760i	N73B60; 6.0 L V12	2002–2008	327 kW (445 PS; 439 hp) at 6,000 rpm	600 N⋅m (443 lb⋅ft) at 3,950 rpm	5.5 s
Alpina B7	N62B44 H1; 4.4 L V8 S/C	2003–2008	368 kW (500 PS; 493 hp) at 5,500 rpm	700 N⋅m (516 lb⋅ft) at 4,250 rpm	4.9 s

=== Diesel ===
Model	Engine	Years	Power	Torque	0–100 km/h (0–62 mph)
730d	M57D30TU; 3.0 L I6 turbo	2002–2005	160 kW (218 PS; 215 hp) at 4,000 rpm	500 N⋅m (369 lb⋅ft) at 2,000 rpm	8.0 s
730d	M57D30TU2; 3.0 L I6 turbo	2005–2008	170 kW (231 PS; 228 hp) at 4,000 rpm	520 N⋅m (384 lb⋅ft) at 2,000–2,750 rpm	7.8 s
740d	M67TUD40; 3.9 L V8 twin-turbo	2002–2004	190 kW (258 PS; 255 hp) at 4,000 rpm	600 N⋅m (443 lb⋅ft) at 1,900–2,500 rpm	7.4 s
745d	M67D44; 4.4 L V8 twin-turbo	2005	220 kW (299 PS; 295 hp) at 4,000 rpm	700 N⋅m (516 lb⋅ft) at 1,750–2,500 rpm	6.8 s
745d	M67TUD44; 4.4 L V8 twin-turbo	2006–2008	242 kW (329 PS; 325 hp) at 3,800 rpm	750 N⋅m (553 lb⋅ft) at 1,900–2,500 rpm	6.6 s

== Transmissions ==
The E65/E66 was the first sedan to use a 6-speed automatic transmission. The specific models of transmission used for the E65 are:

- 6-speed ZF 6HP26 automatic (730d / 735i / 740i / 745i / 750i / 760i)
- 6-speed ZF 6HP19 automatic (730i)
- 6-speed ZF 6HP 32 automatic (740d / 745d)

The E65/E66 was one of the few BMWs to have a column shift lever, as opposed to a stick in the centre console.

== iDrive ==
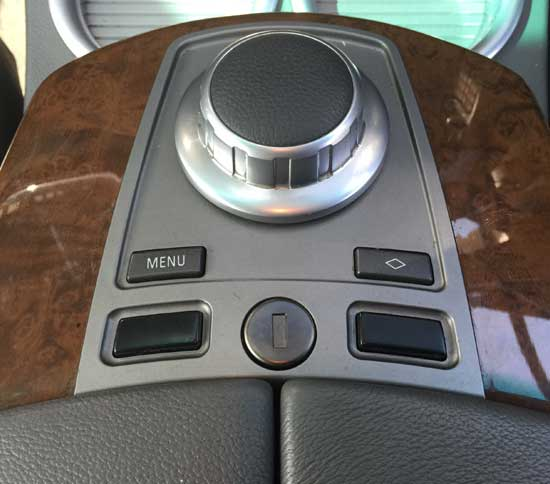
iDrive controller

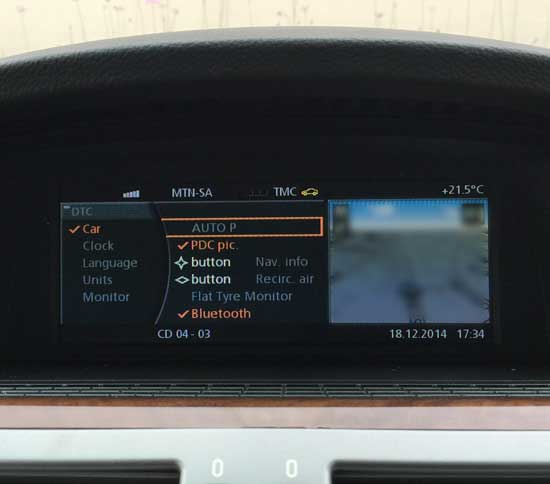
iDrive display

The E65 was the first BMW to use the iDrive infotainment system. The iDrive system was built on VxWorks while the navigation system was built on the Windows CE for Automotive platform, and featured an interface primarily based around a central control knob. Many of the functions such as climate, navigation, seat heating, telephony, and car settings were incorporated into a single system allowing for centralised control. Early versions of iDrive were criticised for complicated menu structures and a steep learning curve.

The first generation of the system relied on CD media for map data. In March 2003, the maps switched to DVD format, a faster processor was used and a 'Menu' and 'Customisable' button were added below the control knob. In 2005, dedicated buttons were added to change radio stations or skip tracks and a brighter screen was used for the 8.8" widescreen option.

== Equipment ==
The E65 was the flagship model and the most technologically advanced car produced by BMW at the time.

The following features were first introduced on the E65:

- Active anti-roll bars (active roll stabilisation) to reduce body roll when cornering. It uses a hydraulic servo in the middle of the anti-roll bar to actively counteract body roll and to reduce body roll without the traditional trade-off in ride comfort.
- Directional headlights (adaptive headlights) which electronically adjust the low-beam lights horizontally (during turns) and vertically (based on rear axle load). Also, the E65 was the first BMW available with bi-Xenon (HID) headlights.
- World's first car with an electric parking brake. This could automatically activate in stop-and-go traffic situations and when the ignition was switched off.
- World's first car to offer a 6-speed automatic transmission
- First BMW with DVD-based GPS automotive navigation system.
- Adaptive cruise control (ACC), however this was available in some markets on the previous generation 7 Series (E38).
- The optional automatic soft close system minimized the force required to close the doors and boot lid, and would completely close them if improperly closed.
- Two fibre-optic electronic networks: MOST Bus (media-orientated system transport) and "Byteflight" (safety systems bus). These busses operate at 22.5 Mbit/s and 10 Mbit/s respectively. Also, the I-bus, K-bus and P-bus were replaced by the K-CAN (Body-controller area network). This increased the system speed from 9.6 kbit/s to 100 kbit/s.

== Special models ==
=== Long-wheelbase 7 Series (E66) ===
The E66 long-wheelbase models, badged "Li" were introduced in June 2002. Long-wheelbase models are 140 mm (5.5 in) longer, allowing for extra rear legroom. The initial long wheelbase models were the 735Li, 745Li and 760Li. After 2003, 730Li, 730Ld, 740Li and 750Li models were added to the lineup.

=== High security 7 Series (E67) ===
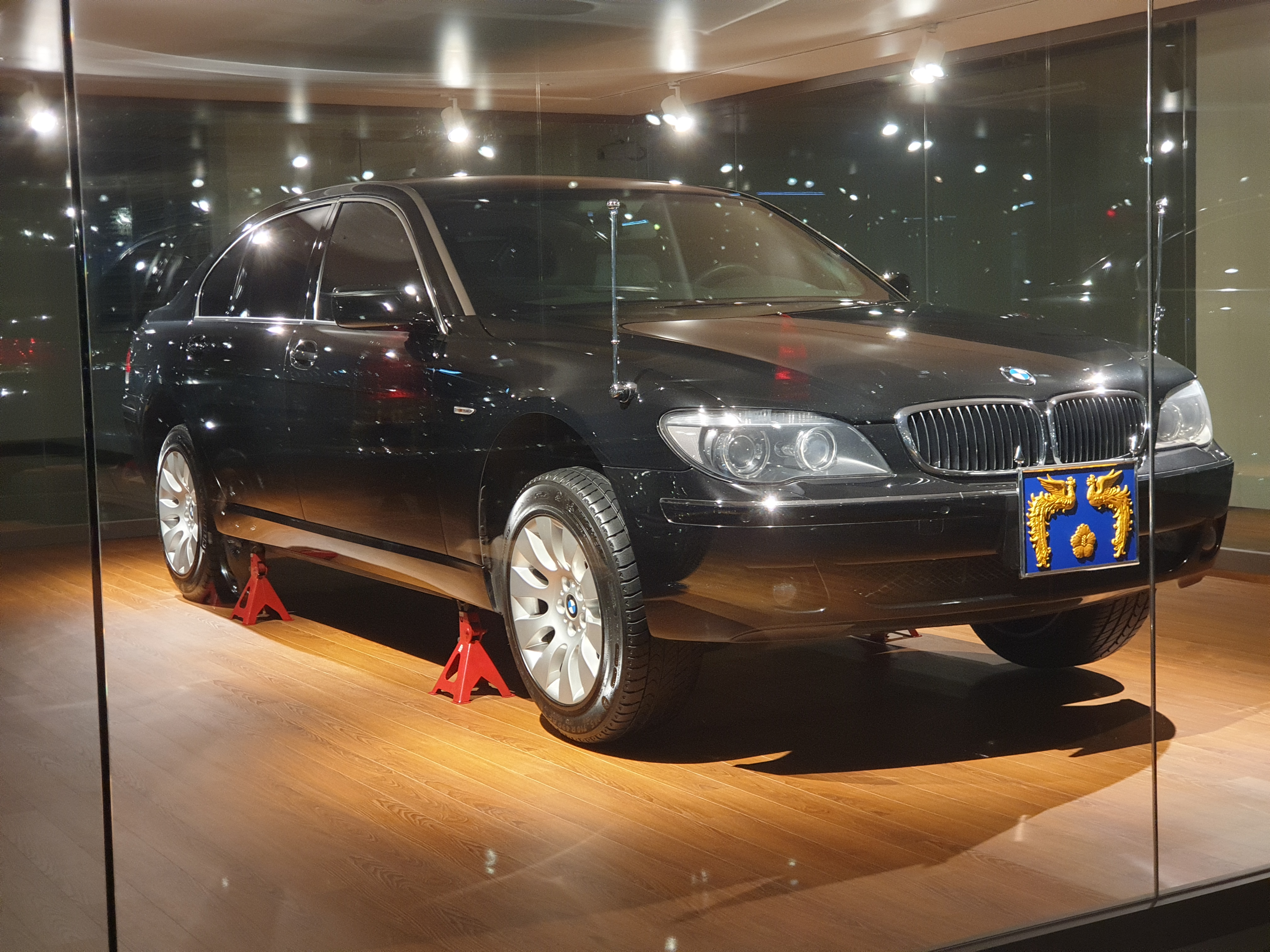
High Security 760Li (E67) front view (Korean Presidential Vehicle)

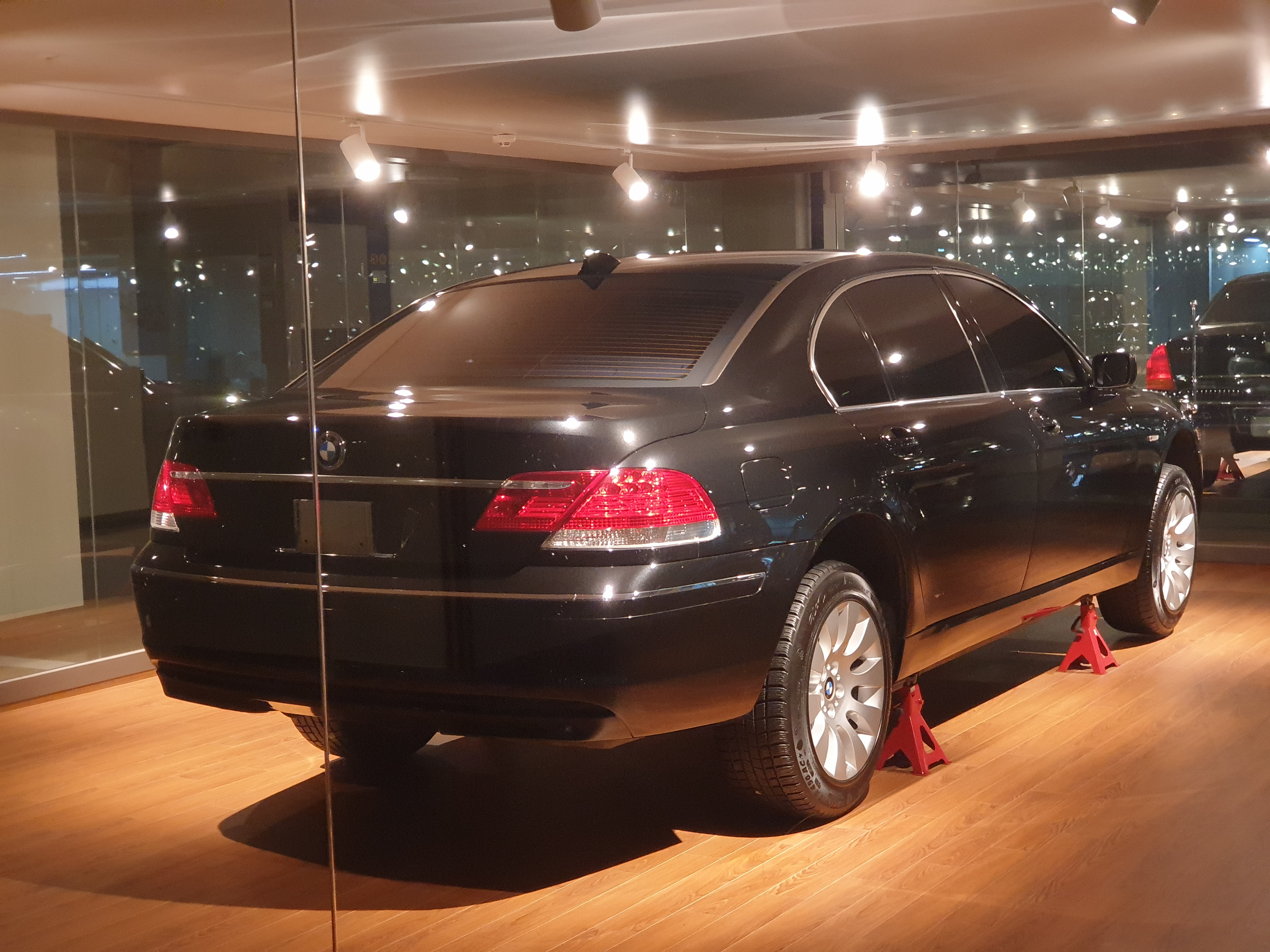
High Security 760Li (E67) rear view (Korean Presidential Vehicle)

The E67 high security 7 Series is an armoured variant of the BMW 7 Series. The 760Li high security was introduced at the 2003 Geneva Motor Show, with the 745Li high security model released later in September 2003.

E67 high security models are designed to withstand attacks, and meet the requirements of the B7 weapons standard. Security features include a detachable multi-layer laminated windscreen, a remote starting system, a fire extinguishing system, a fresh air system, and under-body protection. High security models also feature run flat tyres, with Michelin's PAX system; which allows continuous driving at 80 km/h (50 mph) for approximately 50 km (31 mi), with a puncture.

BMW offers a buyback service for high security models up to seven years old, which are inspected then resold to potential customers worldwide. A training course is also offered to owners and chauffeurs, and teaches car control in case of emergency situations.

=== Hydrogen 7 (E68) ===
The BMW Hydrogen 7 is a limited production hydrogen-fueled model. It uses a modified version of the 760Li's N73 V12 engine, producing 191 kW (256 bhp). Claimed fuel economy is 50 L/100 km (4.7 mpg_{‑US}) and the hydrogen is stored as a liquid in an insulated 170 L (45 US gal) tank. Only 100 cars were made, which were leased to high-profile customers, in order to promote the use of hydrogen vehicles.

== Alpina B7 ==
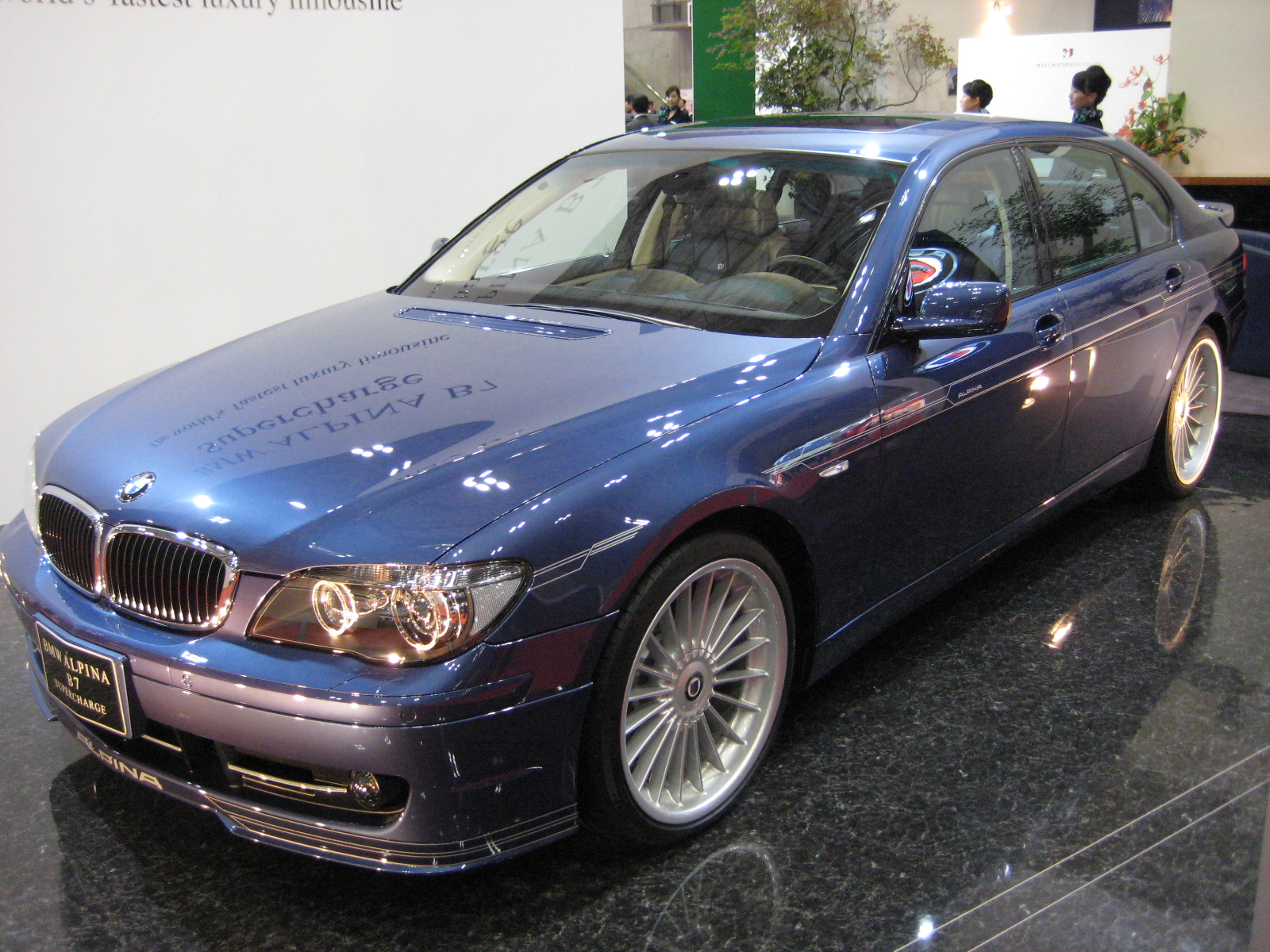
Alpina B7 post-facelift front

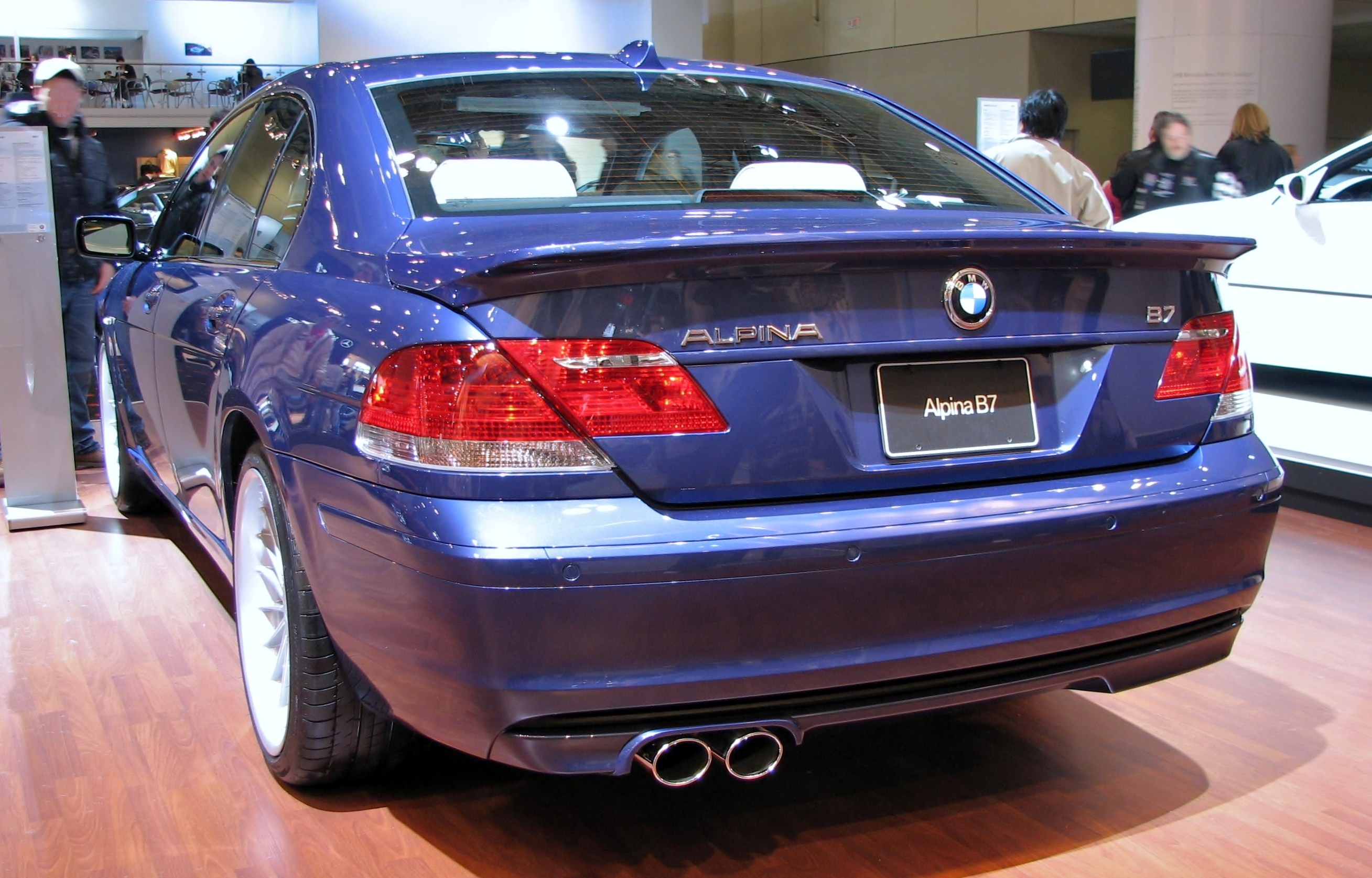
Alpina B7 post-facelift rear

The Alpina B7 prototype was introduced to the public at the 2003 Geneva Motor Show in March, and the production version was later unveiled at the 2003 Frankfurt Motor Show. Production began in February 2004, and was built in the Dingolfing BMW plant alongside the facelift model - E66.

The Alpina B7 uses a supercharged version of the 4.4-litre V8 found in the 745i, and was the first Alpina model to feature a supercharged engine.

Exterior changes include a rear spoiler and 21-inch traditional Alpina multi-spoke style wheels. Interior changes include sports seats, an Alpina instrument cluster, a three spoke steering wheel with shift buttons, and a silver plated production plaque.

A total of 1114 cars were produced, including 803 cars for North America.

== Yearly changes ==
=== 2003 ===
- iDrive updates including faster processor, addition of "menu" and "customisable" buttons and maps switching to DVD format.

=== 2005 facelift ===
In March 2005, the facelift (also known as "LCI") models began production. The major changes were:

- Revised styling for front and rear bodywork, headlights, tail-lights, and a less pronounced trunk lid to address the criticisms of the pre-facelift design. BMW offered "conversion kits" that could be purchased by existing owners to apply these exterior changes to pre-facelift cars.
- iDrive updates including a simplified interface, clearer graphics, and the iDrive controller now having a leather top surface.
- Petrol V8 engines increased in displacement, resulting in the 735i model being replaced by the 740i and the 745i being replaced by the 750i. 745d model power increased from 220 kW to 242 kW.
- Rear track width increased by 14 mm (0.55 in).
- Adaptive cruise control upgraded to ACC II.
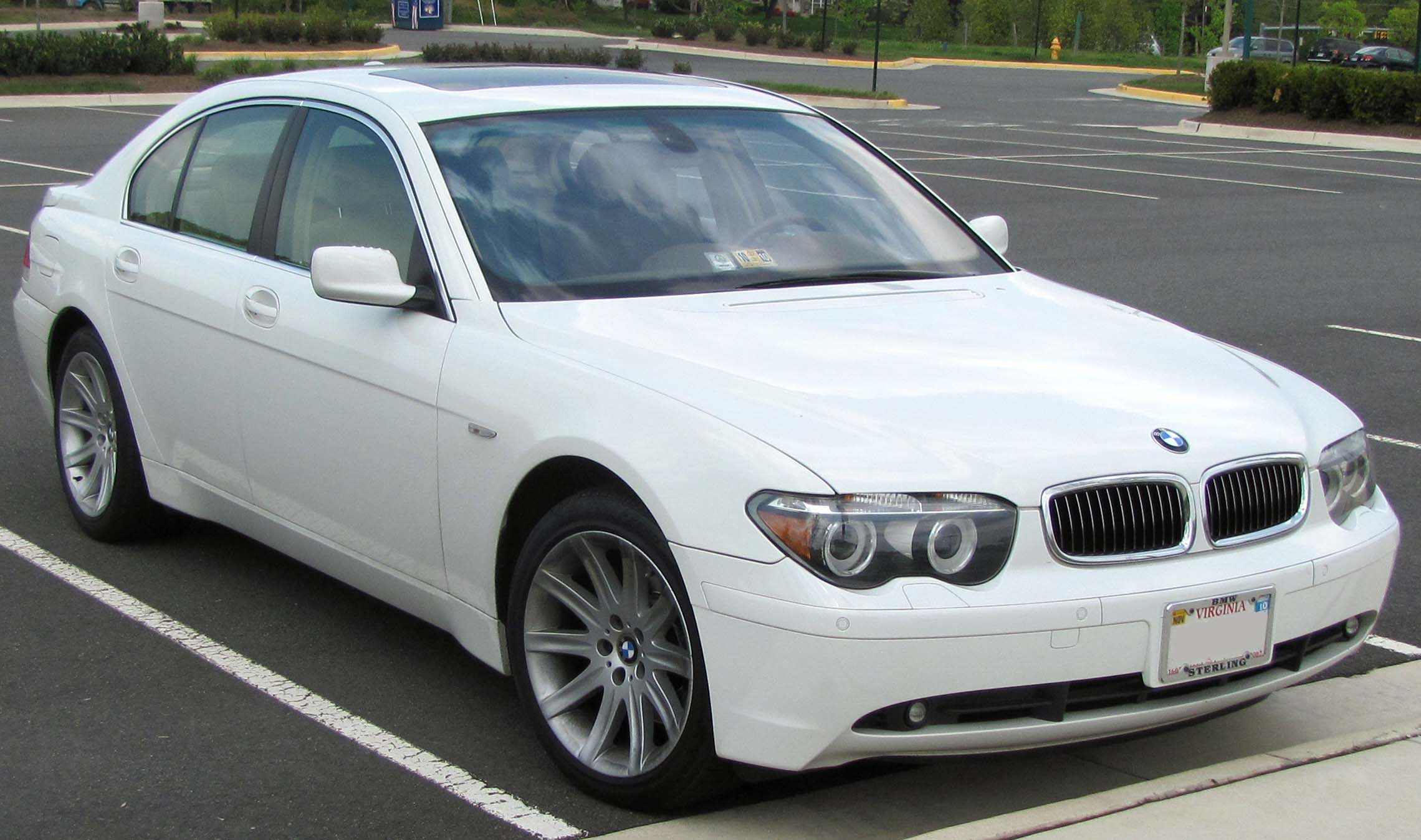
Pre-facelift front

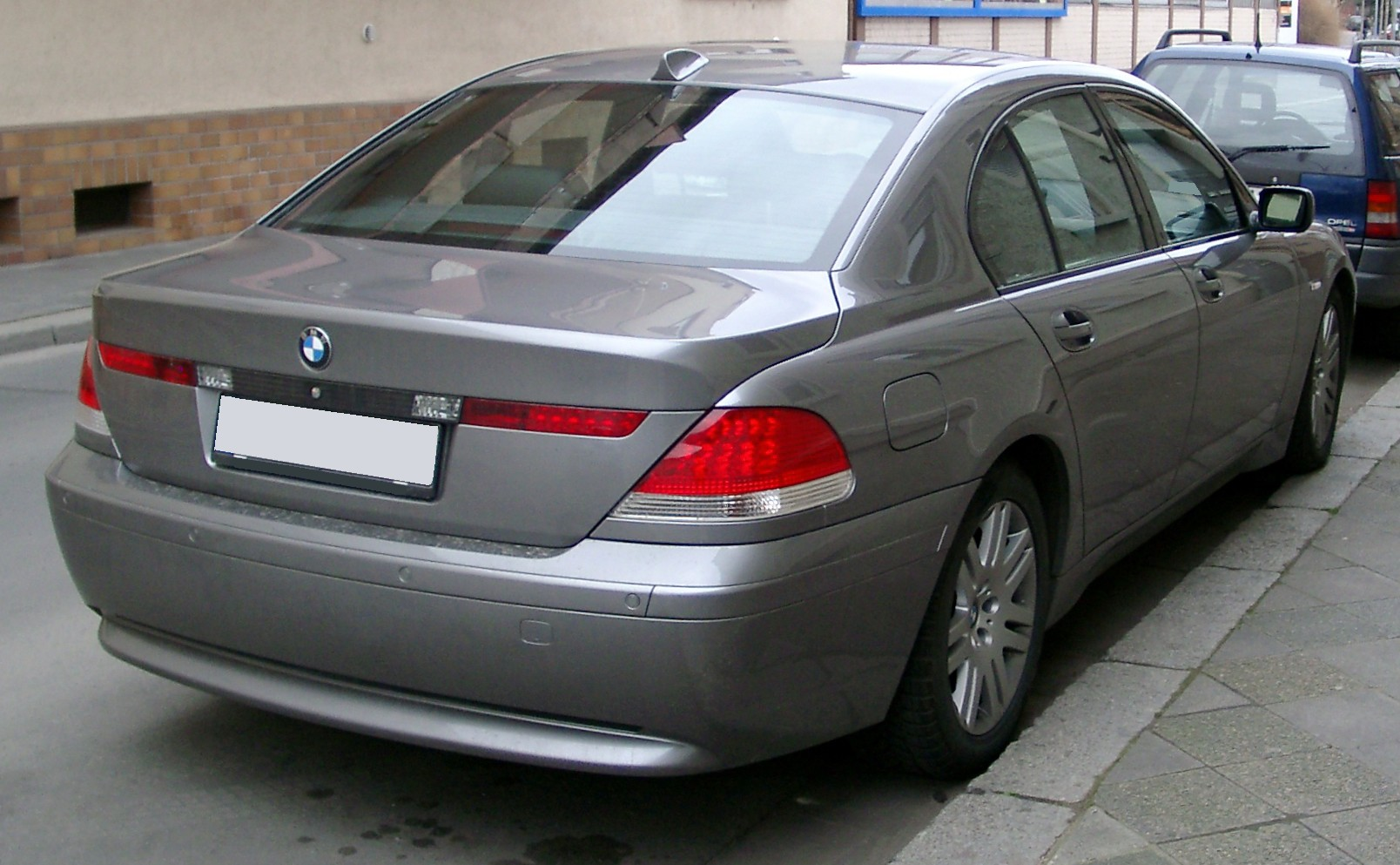
Pre-facelift rear

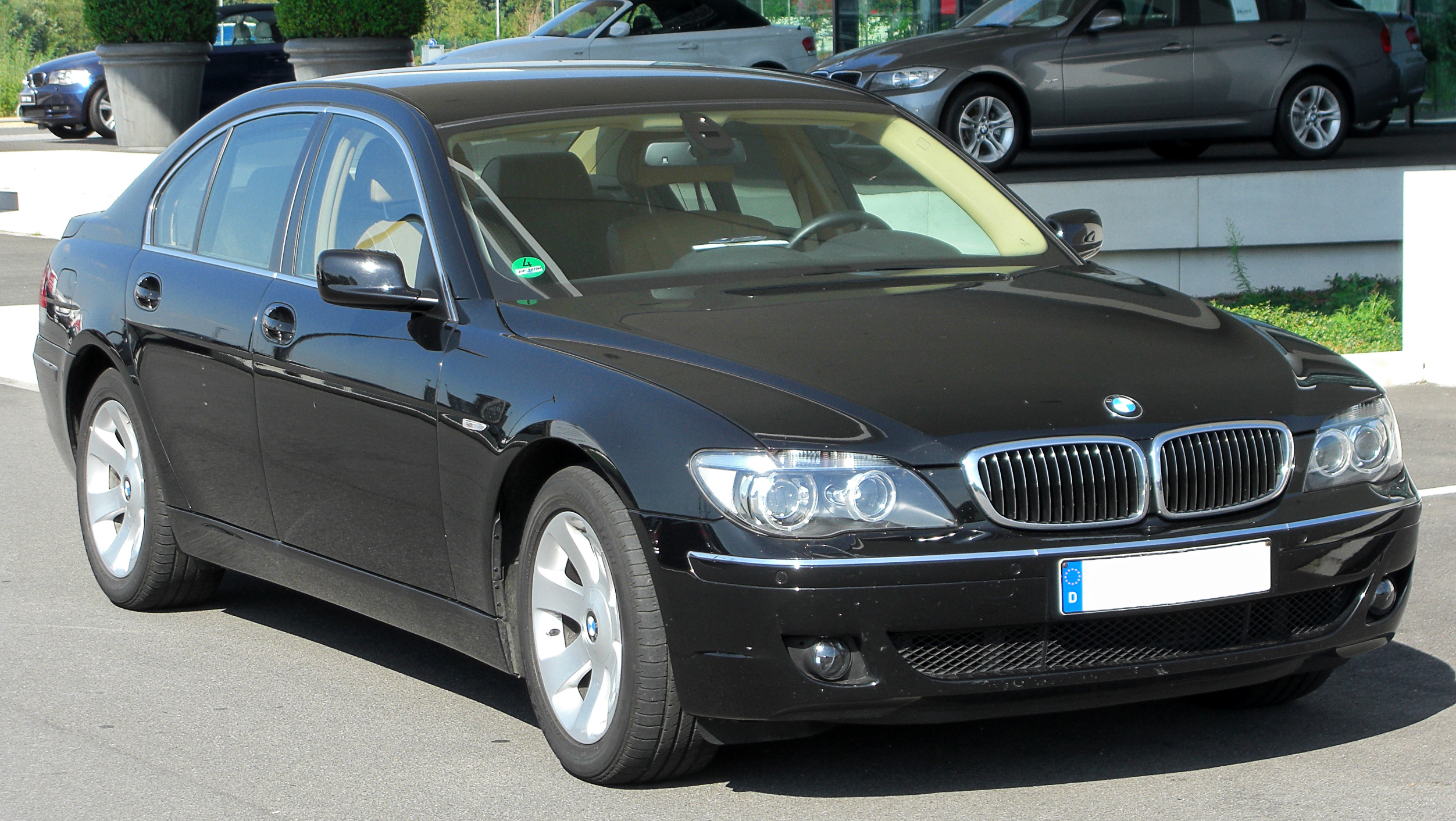
Post-facelift front

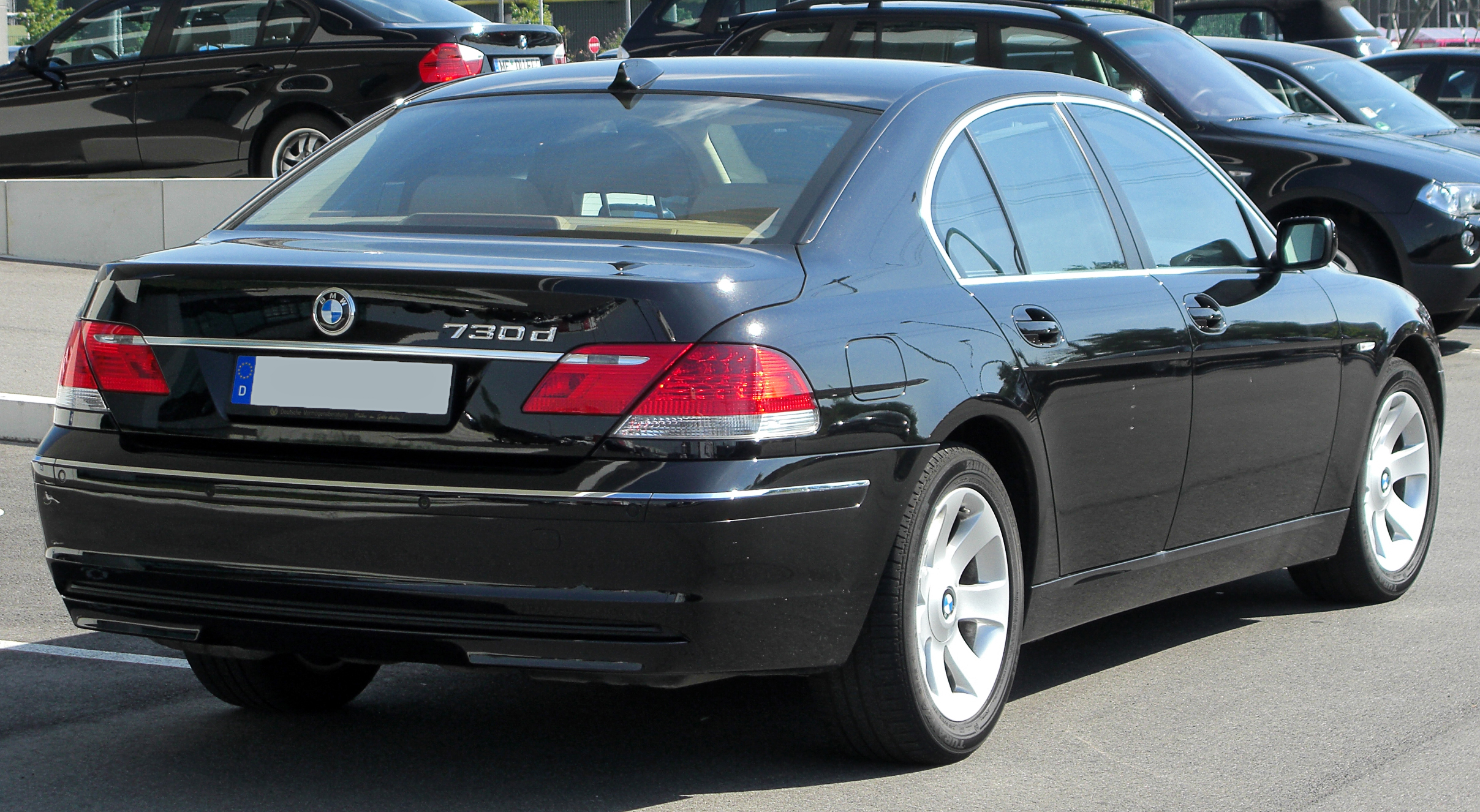
Post-facelift rear

=== Late 2005 ===
In late 2005, night vision (BMW night vision) became available. The system uses passive infrared sensors and has a claimed range of 300 m (980 ft).

Automatic highbeam headlamps (BMW high-beam assistant) was introduced at the same time, whereby the high beam headlights are automatically activated in dark areas and temporarily deactivated when oncoming traffic is detected.

== Production ==
The E65 was produced at the BMW Group Plant Dingolfing in Germany, with complete knock-down (CKD) assembly for local markets conducted in Thailand (Rayong), Russia (Kaliningrad) and Egypt (6th of October City).

The following are production figures for E65 7 Series models:

Year	Total
2001	2,979
2002	50,961
2003	57,899
2004	47,689
2005	50,062
2006	50,227
2007	44,421
2008	38,835
Total:	343,073
