= BMW M67 =

Overview
- Manufacturer: BMW
- Production: 1998-2009

Layout
- Configuration: 90° V8
- Displacement: 3.9 litre (3901 cc); 4.4 litre (4423 cc)
- Cylinder bore: 3.9-litre: 84 mm (3.31 in); 4.4-litre: 87 mm (3.43 in)
- Piston stroke: 3.9-litre: 88 mm (3.46 in); 4.4-litre: 93 mm (3.66 in)
- Cylinder block material: Cast iron (3.9-litre); Aluminium (4.4-litre)
- Cylinder head material: Aluminium
- Valvetrain: DOHC 4 valves x cyl.

RPM range
- Max. engine speed: 4,700

Combustion
- Turbocharger: Twin-turbo
- Fuel system: Common rail direct injection
- Fuel type: Diesel fuel
- Cooling system: Water-cooled

Output
- Power output: 175–243 kW (235–326 hp)
- Torque output: 560–750 N⋅m (413–553 lb⋅ft)

Dimensions
- Dry weight: 3.9-litre: 222 kg (489 lb) (277 kg (611 lb) wet); 4.4-litre: 192 kg (423 lb)

Chronology
- Predecessor: -
- Successor: Does not have a direct V8 diesel successor

The BMW M67 is an automobile diesel engine, used in the BMW 7 Series. It was first introduced in 1998, and used until 2009. The engine is a common rail turbodiesel V8 design, using double overhead camshafts and 32 valves. It is the first luxury car application of a bi-turbo diesel intercooled V8 engine. The 3.9-litre iteration won the "3-4 L" category of the International Engine of the Year award in 1999 and again in 2000. Up to this point, there has been no direct successor to this engine within the BMW lineup.

== Summary ==
Engine	Displacement	Power	Torque	Year
M67D40	3.9 L; 238.1 cu in (3,901 cc)	175 kW (235 hp) at 4,000 rpm	560 N⋅m (413 lb⋅ft) at 2,000 rpm	1999
M67D40	3.9 L; 238.1 cu in (3,901 cc)	180 kW (241 hp) at 4,000 rpm	560 N⋅m (413 lb⋅ft) at 1,750-2,500 rpm	2000
M67TUD40	3.9 L; 238.1 cu in (3,901 cc)	190 kW (255 hp) at 4,000 rpm	600 N⋅m (443 lb⋅ft) at 1,900-2,500 rpm	2002
M67D44	4.4 L; 269.9 cu in (4,423 cc)	220 kW (295 hp) at 4,000 rpm	700 N⋅m (516 lb⋅ft) at 1,750-2,500 rpm	2005
M67TUD44	4.4 L; 269.9 cu in (4,423 cc)	242 kW (325 hp) at 3,800 rpm	750 N⋅m (553 lb⋅ft) at 1,900-2,500 rpm	2006

== M67D40 ==
The M67D40 was introduced in 1998.

Applications:

- 175 kW (235 hp) at 4000 rpm, 560 N⋅m (413 lb⋅ft) at 2000 rpm, with a 4700 rpm redline.
  - 1999-2000 E38 740d
- 180 kW (241 hp) at 4000 rpm, 560 N⋅m (413 lb⋅ft) at 1750-2500 rpm, with a 4700 rpm redline.
  - 1999 Z9 concept
  - 2000-2001 E38 740d

== M67TUD40 ==
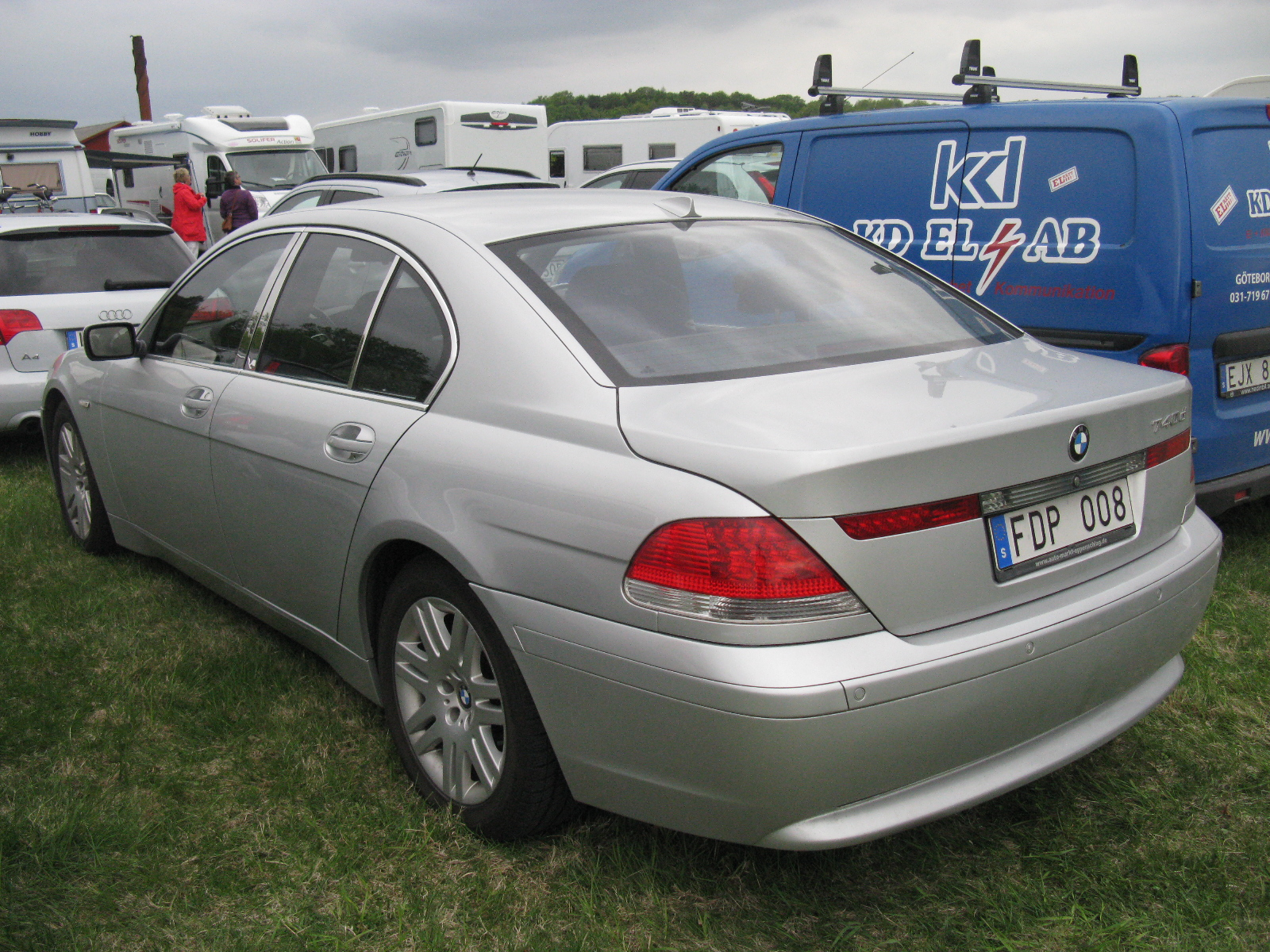
The 2002-2005 BMW E65 740d used the M67TUD40

The M67TUD40 was introduced in 2002. M67TUD40 is also known as M67TUD39.

Applications:

- 190 kW (255 hp) at 4000 rpm, 600 N⋅m (443 lb⋅ft) at 1900-2500 rpm, with a 4700 rpm redline.
  - 2002-2005 E65 740d.
  - 2004 Siemens Combino Duo tram

== M67D44 ==
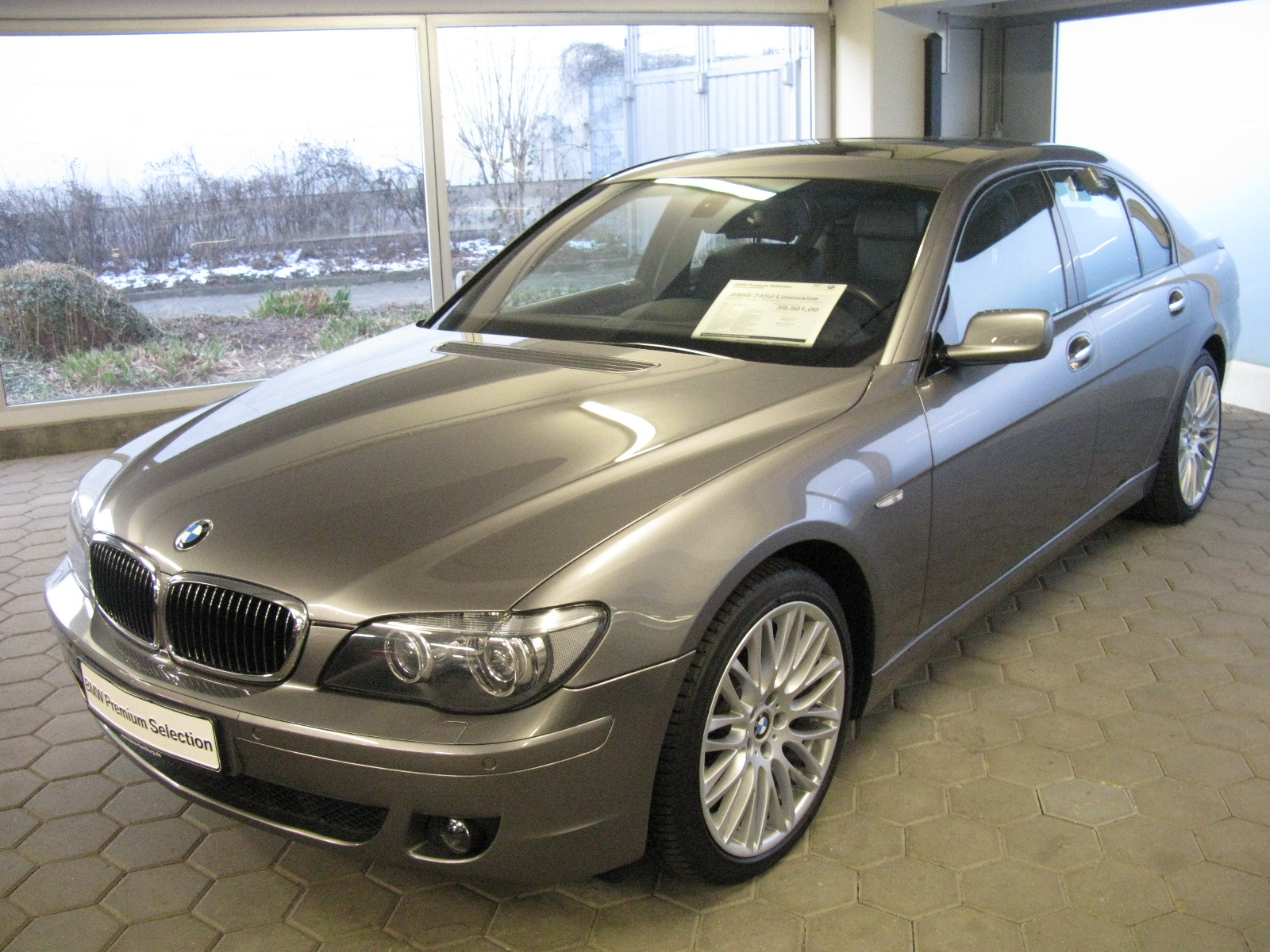
The 2005-2009 BMW E65 745d used the M67D44 and M67TUD44

The M67D44 was introduced in 2005.

Applications:

- 221 kW (296 hp) at 4000 rpm, 700 N⋅m (516 lb⋅ft) at 1750-2500 rpm, with a 4700 rpm redline.
  - 2005-2006 E65 LCI (facelift) 745d.

== M67TUD44 ==
The M67TUD44 was introduced in 2006.

Applications: 243 kW (326 hp) at 4000 rpm, 750 N⋅m (553 lb⋅ft) at 1900-2500 rpm, with a 4700 rpm redline.

  - 2006-2009 E65 LCI (facelift) 745d.
