= Adrian van Hooydonk =

Dutch automobile designer (born 1964)

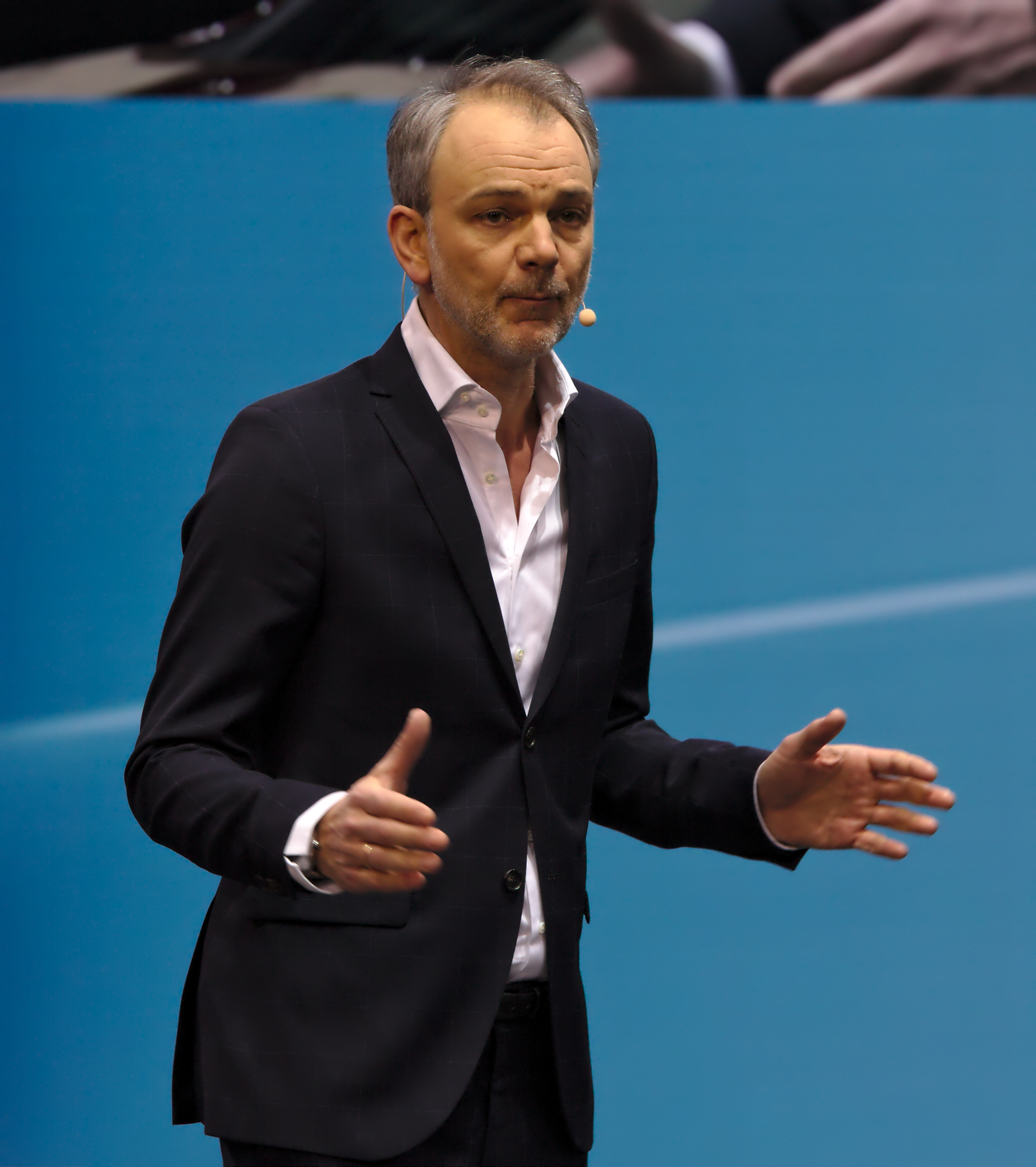
- Adrian van Hooydonk at the 2018 Geneva Motor Show
- Born: 21 June 1964 (age 62); Echt, Netherlands
- Education: Delft University of Technology
- Occupation: Car designer
- Years active: 1992-present
- Employer: BMW
- Notable work: BMW 7 Series (2001); BMW Z9 (1999)

Adrian van Hooydonk (born 21 June 1964 in Echt, Limburg), is a Dutch automobile designer and BMW Group's Design Director. He is based in Munich, Germany.

== Biography ==
He studied at Delft University of Technology in the Netherlands, where he received his diploma in 1988. His career started off with one year as a freelance designer, followed in 1989 as a product designer with GE Plastics Europe, and then returned to study Automotive Design Studies at Art Center Europe in Vevey, Switzerland.

== Work at BMW ==
He joined BMW in 1992 as an automotive exterior designer in Munich, Germany. In 2000 he was Head of Automotive Exterior Design at BMW's industrial design centre DesignworksUSA, quickly becoming the president of Designworks in 2001. He left Designworks in 2005 to be promoted to head up the Brand Design Studio, under the direction of the BMW Group Design Director Chris Bangle, and in 2009 became Director of BMW Group Design, succeeding Chris Bangle as the head of design for the company. As head of group design he oversees the design work of BMW, Mini and Rolls-Royce.

=== Attributed designs ===
- Mini ACV30 (1997)
- BMW Z9 (1999)
- BMW 7 Series (2001)
- BMW 6 Series (2003)
- BMW X3 (2003)
- BMW X5 (2006)
- BMW 5 Series (2010)

== Personal life ==
Van Hooydonks first car was a Peugeot 104. He owns an orange 1976 BMW 316 (E21). One of his hobbies is racing oldtimers.

He credits Italian architect Mario Bellini as one of his most influential designers as well as designers and artists Olafur Eliasson, Jeff Koons, Gerhard Richter, Rem Koolhaas, Frank Gehry and Herzog & de Meuron as inspirations.

== See also ==
- Harm Lagaay
- Emeco collaboration
