= Byteflight =

Byteflight is an automotive databus created by BMW and partners Motorola, Elmos Semiconductor and Infineon to address the need for a modernized safety-critical, fault tolerant means of electronic communication between automotive components. It is a message-oriented protocol. As a predecessor to FlexRay, byteflight uses a hybrid synchronous/asynchronous TDMA based means of data transfer to circumvent deficiencies associated with pure event-triggered databuses.

It was first introduced in 2001 on the BMW 7 Series (E65).

Eclipse 500 jet aeroplanes use Byteflight to connect the avionics displays.

== Data frame ==
In Byteflight terminology, a data frame is called a "telegraph".

A telegraph starts with a start sequence containing six dominant bits. This start sequence is followed by a one byte message identifier. This is followed by a length field indicating the length in bytes of the transmitted data. The telegraph ends with a 15 bit CRC value encoded in two bytes leaving the LSB unused.

All bytes are framed by a recessive start bit at the beginning and a dominant stop bit at the end.
