= Hideo Kodama (designer) =

Japanese automobile designer (born 1944)

Hideo Kodama (born 1944) is a Japanese automobile designer.

== Early life ==
He was born in Yokohama, the capital city of Kanagawa Prefecture, and in the Greater Tokyo Area. As a boy, he had often painted pictures of cars.

He studied at Tama Art University in Tokyo, studying in the Industrial Design department. He graduated in 1966.

== Career ==
=== General Motors ===
Seeing little opportunity for automotive designers in his native Japan at the time, he opted instead to join General Motors’s Adam Opel AG at Rüsselsheim am Main in Germany in 1966. This became the General Motors Europe Headquarter in 1986. The design studio had opened in 1964. He worked in Rüsselsheim with the main designer Erhard Schnell, and George Gallion, the deputy chief designer. By the early 1980s, he was Chief Designer, working with the designer Chris Bangle from 1981-85.

In 1992, he became Chief Designer for the second generation Corsa, known as the Corsa B. This car was launched in April 1993 in the UK, and four million were sold around the world. Kodama was also responsible for the design of the next generation Corsa, the Corsa C. His design for the Agila was built from 2000; the later models of that vehicle ceased production in 2014. He left General Motors Europe in 2004.

== Personal life ==
He lives in Rhineland-Palatinate in Germany.

== Design work ==
- Opel Junior
- Opel Corsa B
- Opel Corsa C
- Opel Tigra

== Gallery ==
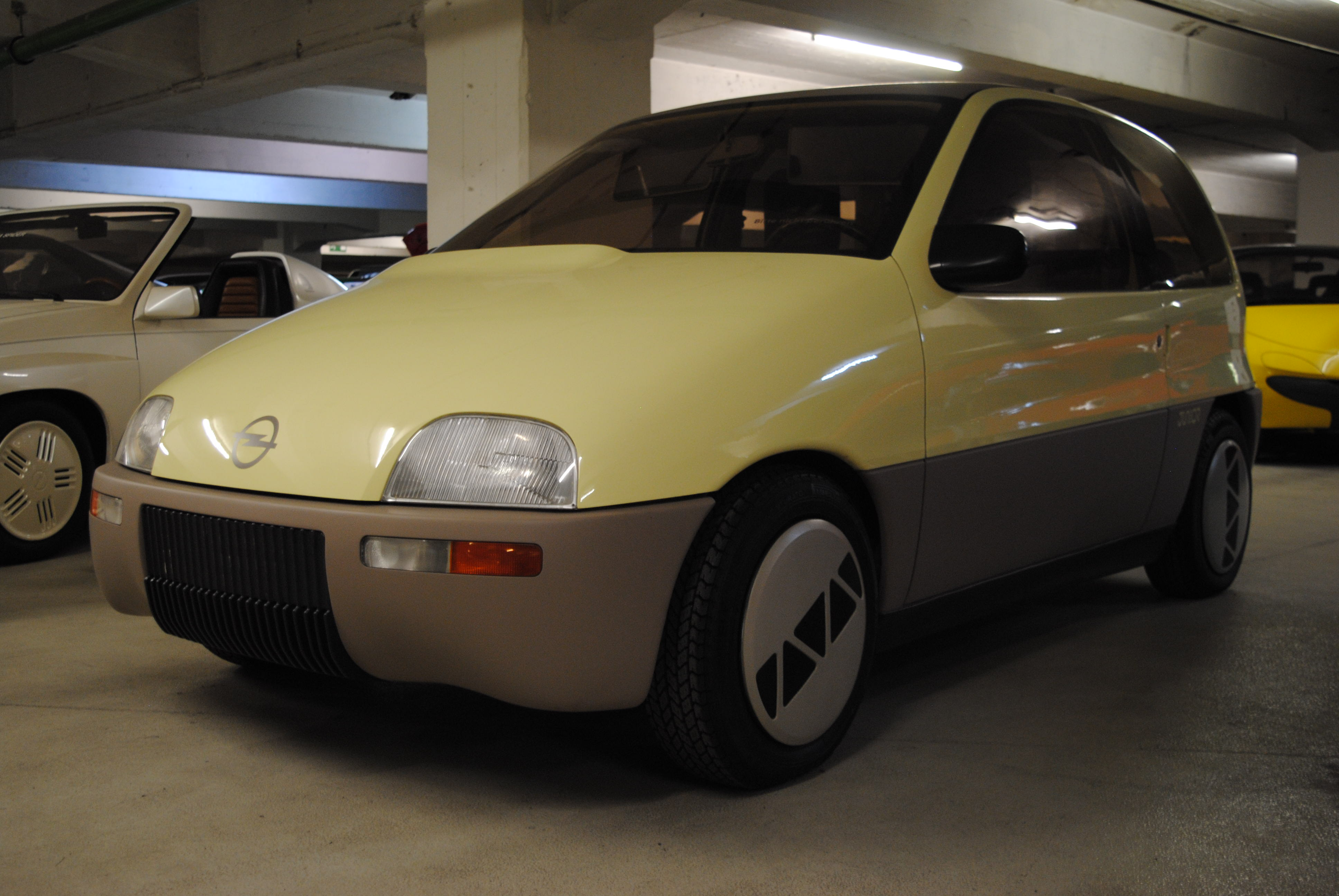
Opel Junior (1983)

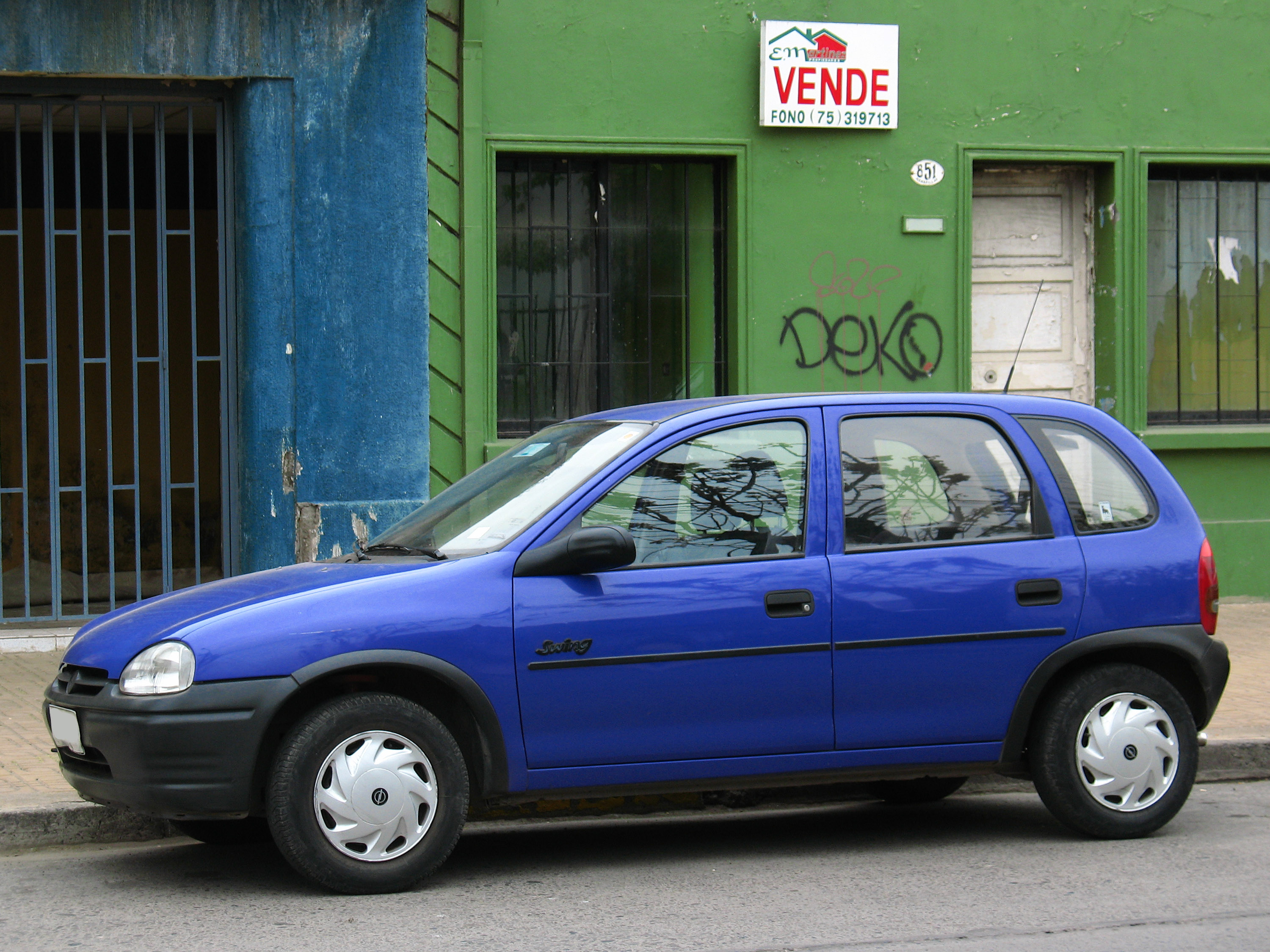
Opel/Vauxhall Corsa B (1993)

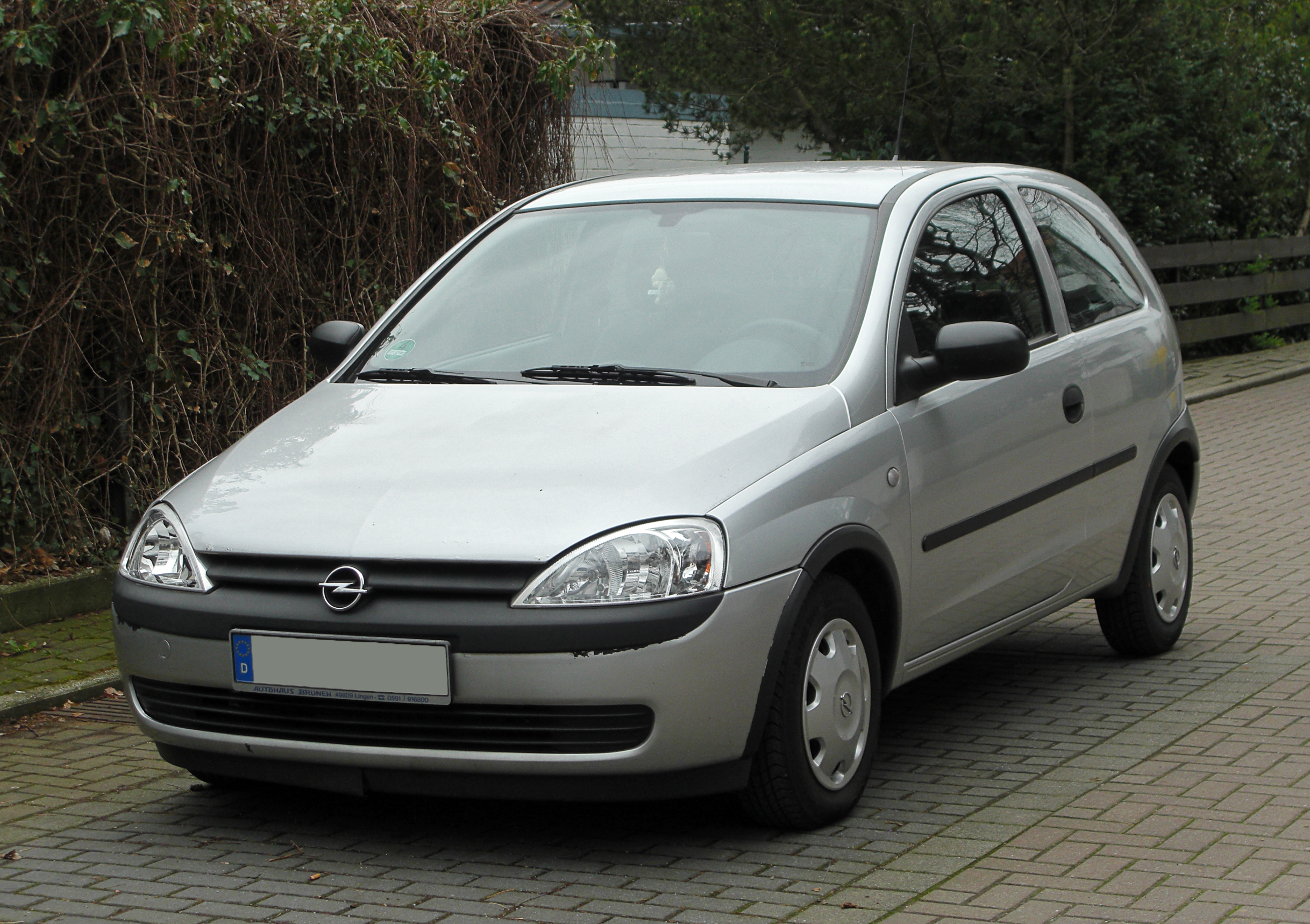
Opel Corsa C (2000)

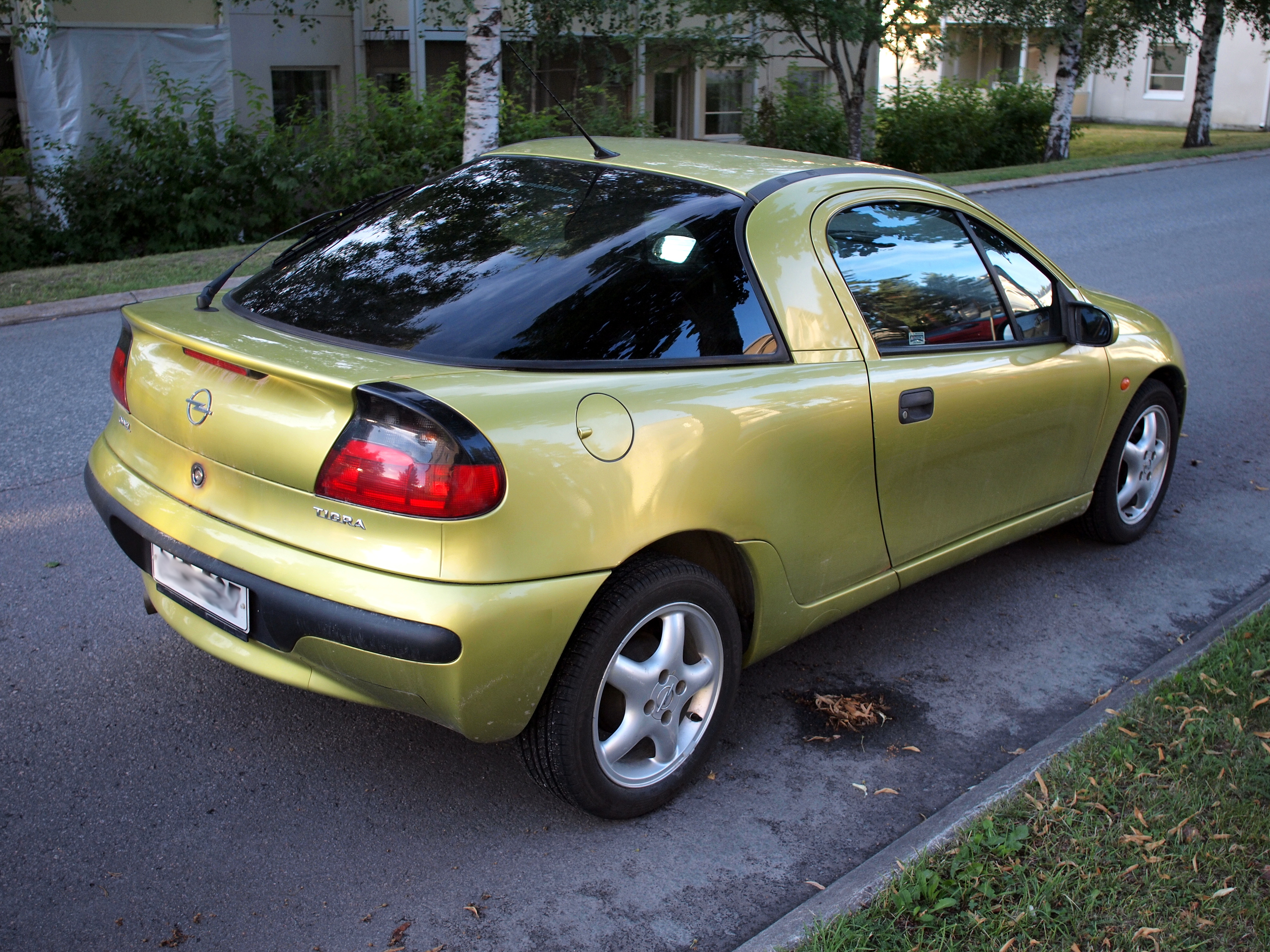
Opel Tigra A (1994)

== See also ==
- Chris Svensson (1965-2018), designer of the 1990s Ford Ka
- International Technical Development Center in Germany
- Walter Röhrl, rally driver in GM vehicles in the early 1980s
