= Opel Junior =

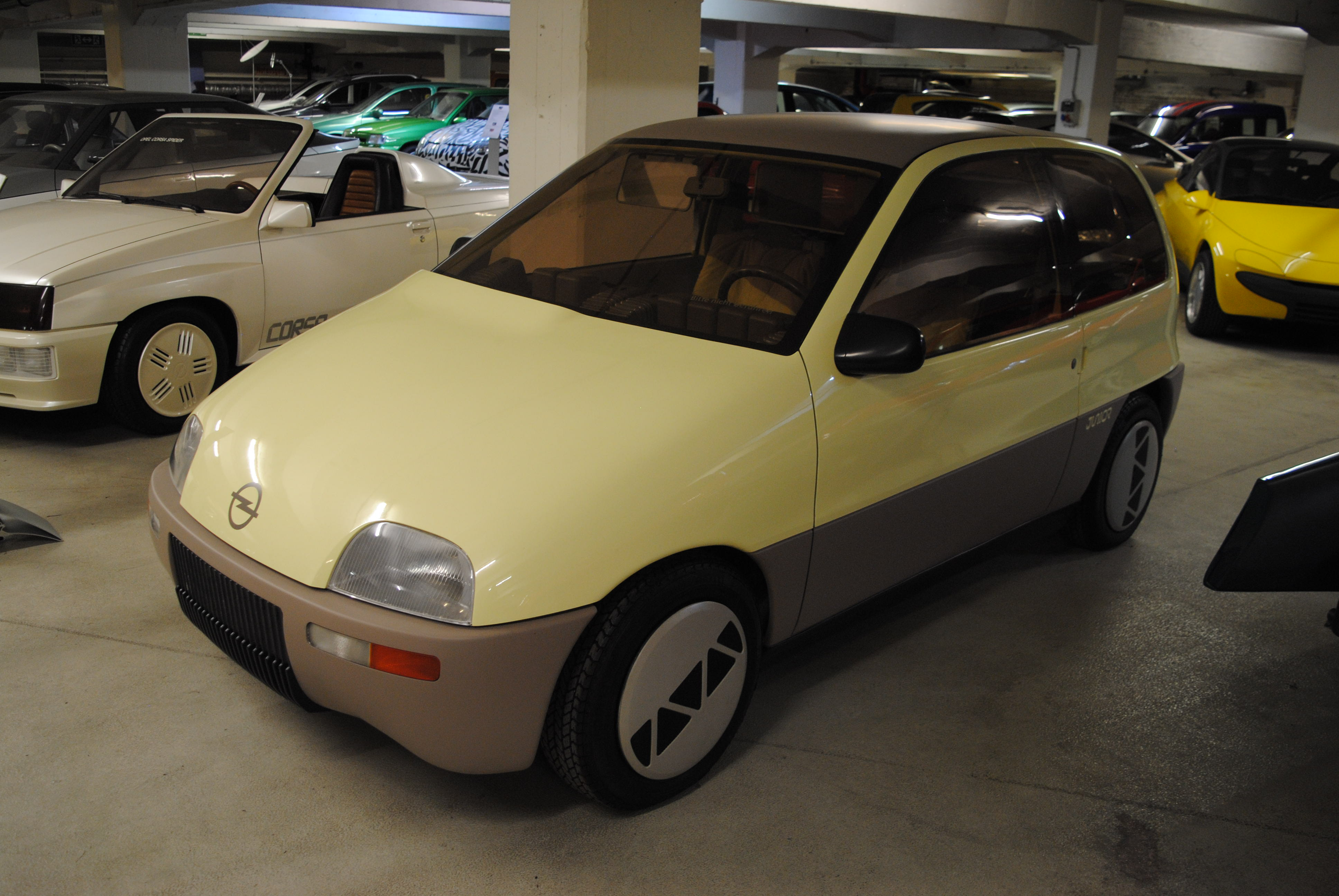

Overview
- Manufacturer: Opel
- Production: 1983 (Concept Car)
- Designer: Hideo Kodama; Chris Bangle; Gert Hildebrand

Body and chassis
- Class: Supermini (B)
- Body style: 3 door hatchback
- Layout: FF layout
- Related: Opel Corsa

Powertrain
- Engine: 1.2 L I4 (petrol)

Dimensions
- Wheelbase: 2,220 mm (87.4 in)
- Length: 3,410 mm (134.3 in)
- Width: 1,570 mm (61.8 in)
- Height: 1,450 mm (57.1 in)
- Kerb weight: 650 kg (1,433 lb)

The Opel Junior is a concept car designed and built by the German automobile manufacturer Opel. It was first shown to the public at the 1983 Frankfurt Motor Show in September 1983. The small 3.41 m (134.3 in) long three door supermini was powered by a 1.2-litre petrol engine developing 55 PS (40 kW).

It featured a particularly low drag coefficient of Cd=0.31, and a low kerb weight of 650 kg (1,433 lb). The interior design was modular, with the dashboard elements being removable, such as the stereo and clock, and the seat covers could be used as sleeping bags. The design of the Opel Junior was based on the Opel Corsa, and it was a three door hatchback (two door, front engine).

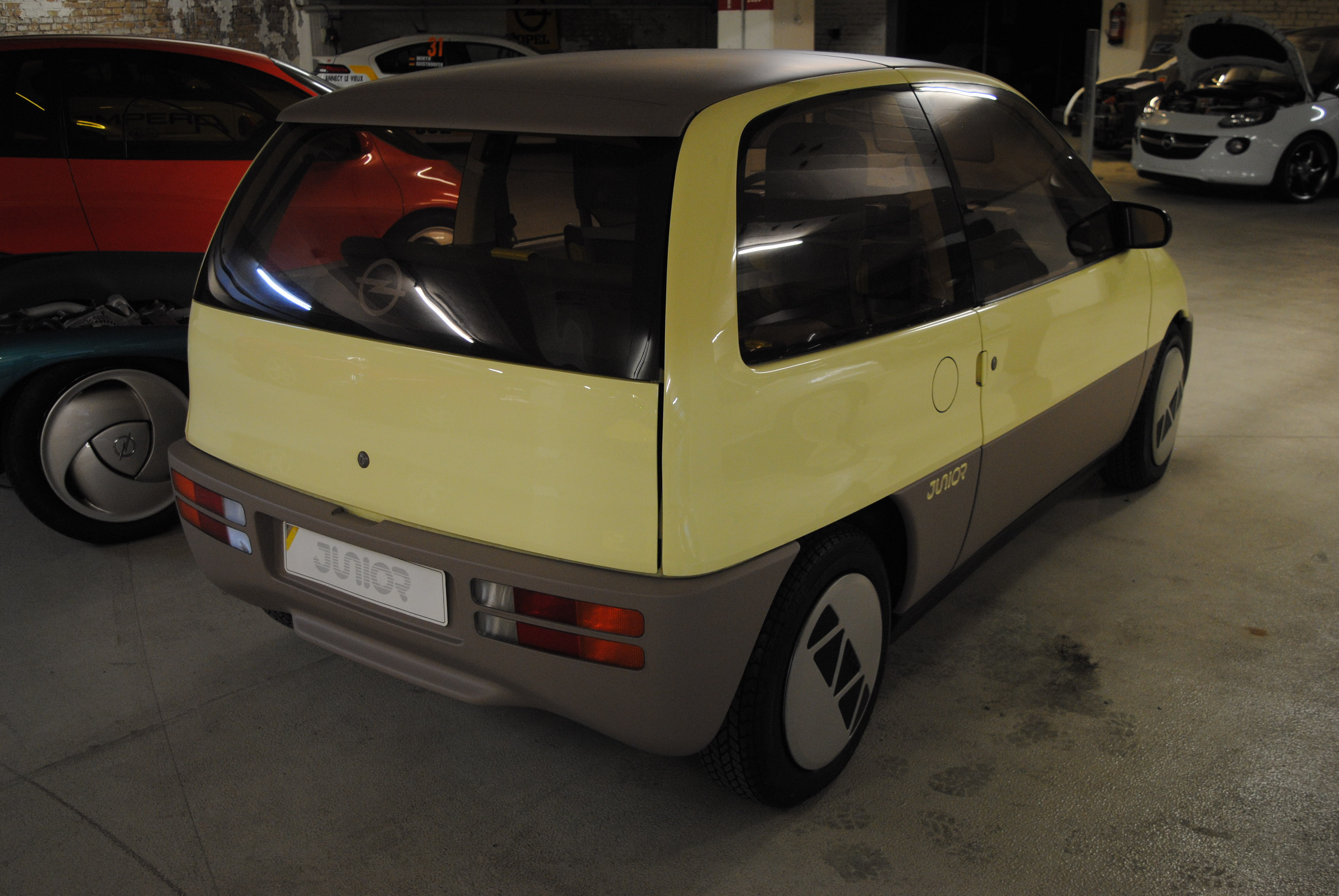
Rear view

The nameplate Junior was used as the codename for the Opel Adam, which was released in the end of 2012. The Adam's official name was released in April 2012.
