= BMW GINA =

BMW Gina
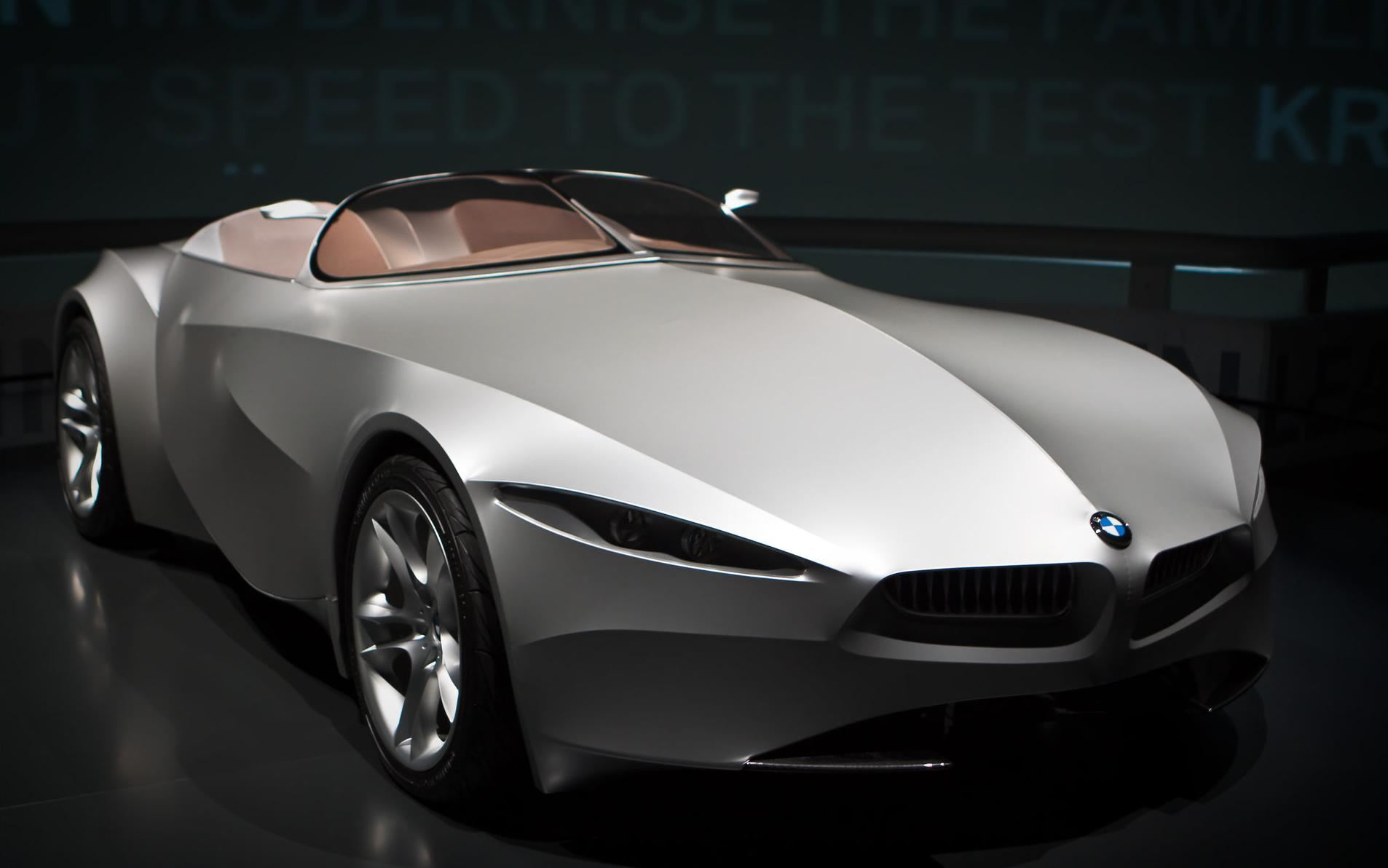
- BMW Gina concept, BMW Museum, Munich, Germany

Overview
- Manufacturer: BMW
- Designer: Chris Bangle

Body and chassis
- Class: Concept sports car

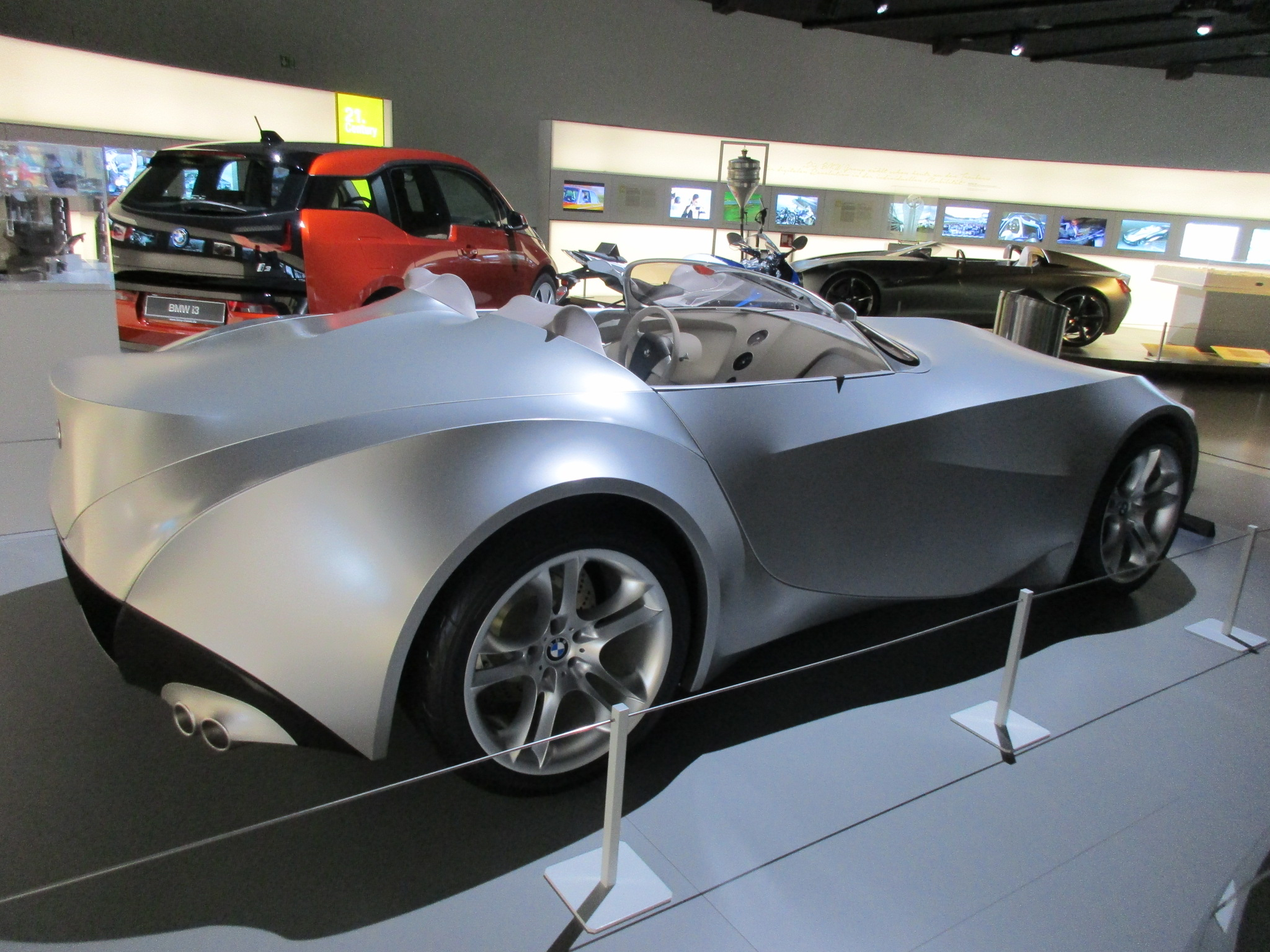
Rear view

The GINA Light Visionary Model is a fabric-skinned shape-shifting sports car concept built by BMW. GINA stands for "Geometry and functions In 'N' Adaptions". It was designed by a team led by BMW's head of design, Chris Bangle, who says GINA allowed his team to "challenge existing principles and conventional processes." Other designers include Anders Warming.

Construction began in 2001, with the finished car being presented in 2008.

== Fabric body ==
BMW claims the elastic, water resistant, translucent man-made fabric skin—polyurethane-coated Spandex—is resilient and durable. It resists high or low temperatures, does not swell or shrink, and the movement does not slacken or damage the fabric. The body changes its shape according to exterior conditions and speeds, and it also allows the driver to change its shape at will. The fabric is stretched over a frame with moving parts; shapes are formed beneath the skin by an aluminium wire structure, though at points where flexibility is needed (ducts, door openings, spoiler), flexible carbon struts are used.

The shape of the frame is controlled by many electric and hydraulic actuators; for example, the headlights are revealed when small motors pull the fabric open from slits in an eyelid-like fashion, and access to the engine can be gained through a slit that opens down the middle of the bonnet. As the fabric is translucent, the taillights simply shine through it.

GINA has just four "panels"—the bonnet, the two side panels and the trunk. Its skin appears seamless, but it can "grow" out its rear spoiler for stability at high speed. Its doors open in a butterfly style and are each covered by a fabric piece reaching all the way from the nose of the car to their trailing edge which, when closed, leaves a perfectly smooth surface.

== Interior ==
When the car is parked, the car's steering wheel and instruments sit in an "idle" position on the centre console to allow the driver easy entry. The steering wheel and instruments assume their correct positions when the driver presses the start button and the headrest rises from the seat once the driver is seated, making it easier to get in and out of the car.

== Jokes around the name ==
The unusual name for the concept vehicle has amused some commentators. A few have compared the opening on the bonnet/hood to a vagina. Carscoops did so after receiving an image of the vehicle from Top Gear Magazine, commenting: "Mystery Solved: Why BMW Calls it 'Gina...". Jalopnik also picked up on the name but refused to clarify, joking that they were a "family show".

This along with the selection of a V8 engine has further motivated several YouTube commentators to suggest V8GINA as a custom license plate number for BMW Gina.
