= Fiat Coupé =

Italian car model made 1993–2000

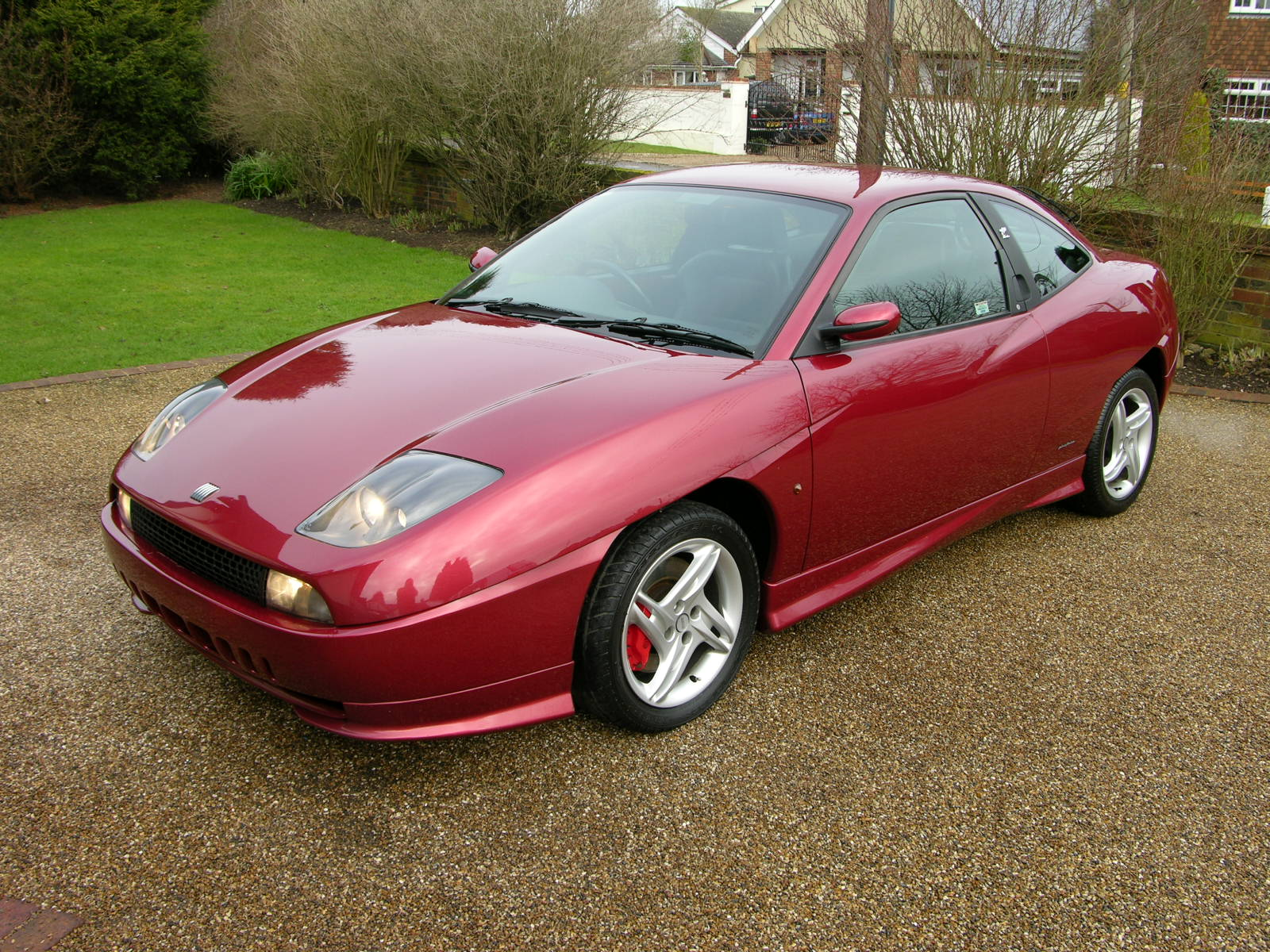
- 1999 Fiat Coupé 20V Turbo

Overview
- Manufacturer: Fiat
- Also called: Coupé Fiat
- Production: 1993–2000
- Assembly: Turin, Italy (Pininfarina)
- Designer: Chris Bangle at Centro Stile Fiat (1991); Pininfarina (Interior)

Body and chassis
- Class: Sports car (S)
- Body style: 2-door coupé
- Layout: FF layout
- Platform: Type Two (Tipo Due)
- Related: Fiat Tipo (160)

Powertrain
- Engine: 1.8 L Family B 16V I4; 2.0 L Family B 16V I4; 2.0 L Twin Cam 16V turbo I4; 2.0 L Family C 20V I5; 2.0 L Family C 20V turbo I5
- Transmission: 5 and 6-speed manual

Dimensions
- Wheelbase: 2,540 mm (100.0 in)
- Length: 4,250 mm (167.3 in)
- Width: 1,768 mm (69.6 in)
- Height: 1,340 mm (52.8 in)
- Curb weight: 1,250–1,320 kg (2,760–2,910 lb)

Chronology
- Predecessor: Fiat 124 Sport Coupé; Fiat 128 Coupé

The Fiat Coupé (Type 175), officially also known as Coupé Fiat, is a car that was manufactured by Fiat between 1993 and 2000. The two-door, four-seater coupé was introduced at the Bologna Motor Show in December 1993 and features an exterior design by Chris Bangle at Centro Stile Fiat and an interior designed by Pininfarina.

== History ==
The Fiat Coupé made media headlines in auto magazines during 1992, after several spy shots were taken revealing the car on test. Fiat had decided to produce a new coupé based upon the old Tipo platform when the Pininfarina factory was suddenly dormant after the Cadillac Allanté project failed around 1990. Two designs were put forward, with Fiat's in-house Centro Stile team competing with Pininfarina. The concept as put forward by Centro Stile's Chris Bangle unexpectedly won the Fiat management over. The design previously offered by Pininfarina was eventually accepted by Peugeot, who adopted it as the 406 Coupé in October 1996.

On its launch in January 1994, the Coupé was available with a four-cylinder, 2.0 L 16V engine, in both turbo (190 PS) and normally aspirated (139 PS) versions. Both engines were later versions of Fiat's twin-cam design and inherited from the Lancia Delta Integrale, winner of the World Rally Championship a record six times. 1996 brought in a 1.8 L 16V engine (not available in the United Kingdom, 131 PS), along with a 2.0 litre five cylinder 20V (147 PS), and a five-cylinder 2.0 litre 20V turbo (220 PS). Along with the new engines Fiat also made some minor design changes including the front grille, steering wheel, the door panel now included leather, the interior centre console was redesigned and the digital clock was replaced with an analog one.

Production of the right-hand drive models for markets including the UK began in early 1995, and continued until the end of Coupé production five years later.

Both the turbocharged 16V/4-cylinder and 20V/5-cylinder (four valves per cylinder) versions were equipped with a very efficient Viscodrive limited-slip differential to counter the understeer that plagues most powerful front wheel drive cars.

Additionally, the Coupé featured independent suspension all round: at the front MacPherson struts and lower wishbones anchored to an auxiliary crossbeam, offset coil springs and anti roll bar; at the rear, trailing arms mounted on an auxiliary subframe, coil springs and an anti roll bar.

Production figures
Year	Units made
1993	119
1994	17,619
1995	13,732
1996	11,273
1997	12,288
1998	9,042
1999	6,332
2000	2,357
Total	72,762

1998 saw the release of the Limited Edition which could be identified externally by a body kit, titanium grey details such as the wheels, fuel cap, rear light cups, mirror casings and the Brembo brake calipers at the front were now painted red. Inside, the Limited Edition specification included a push-button start, Recaro seats with red leather inserts, Sparco pedals and the body-coloured dash was replaced with a titanium grey example. Mechanically, there were few changes over the standard 20V Turbo model, but the LE (as they came to be known) did add a six speed gearbox for the first time, strut brace and the engine covers were all painted red.

The LE was produced in Black (flat), Red (flat), Vinci Grey (metallic), Crono Grey (flat) and Steel Grey (metallic).

Each Limited Edition ('LE') Coupé was manufactured with a badge located by the rear view mirror which contained that car's unique number (it is rumoured that Michael Schumacher was the original owner of LE No. 0001, however when the question was raised to him personally he confirmed he had owned one, but a red one, while LE No. 0001 is a Crono Grey one). Originally, a spokesman from Fiat stated only approximately 300 Limited Editions would be built (although the plaques always allowed for four-figure numbers). The final amount was much higher, with numbers as high as 1400 touted by some. This angered many of the owners of the original 300 cars and almost certainly impacted residual values. The original number however was quoted by a spokesman for Fiat UK, so probably that number only applied to the United Kingdom.

In 1998, the 2.0 litre, five-cylinder 20V got a Variable Inlet System, which brought the power to 154 PS (113 kW). In addition, the sills of the Turbo version were colour matched with the body paintwork. Fiat also released the 2.0 litre five-cylinder Turbo 'Plus'. This model came with an option kit that made it virtually identical to the LE, except for minor interior design changes and without the unique identification badge of the LE.

In early 2000, Fiat released another special version of the Fiat Coupé. Featuring the 1.8 litre engine, it was only available throughout mainland Europe and marketed as an elegant and affordable edition. This final version had different leather seats, a white speedometer with yellow arrows, new 16 inch BBS rims and the new "honeycomb" grille. Production finished in the summer of that year, with no plans for a direct successor.

Fiat also made changes throughout the rest of the range: new seats, side skirts, wheels for the 2.0 litre 20V model, 'Plus' edition wheels and a six speed transmission as standard on turbo models, and Fiat manufactured seats on the 'Plus' that were virtually identical to the original Plus Recaro seats with the addition of extra airbags.

The 2.0 litre 20V Turbo model is capable of accelerating from 0–100 km/h (0–62 mph) in 6.5 seconds, and 6.3 seconds for the 20v Turbo Plus, with a top speed of 240 km/h (149 mph), or 250 km/h (155 mph) with the later six speed gearbox. When production finally ended in December 2000, a total number of 72,762 units had been produced.

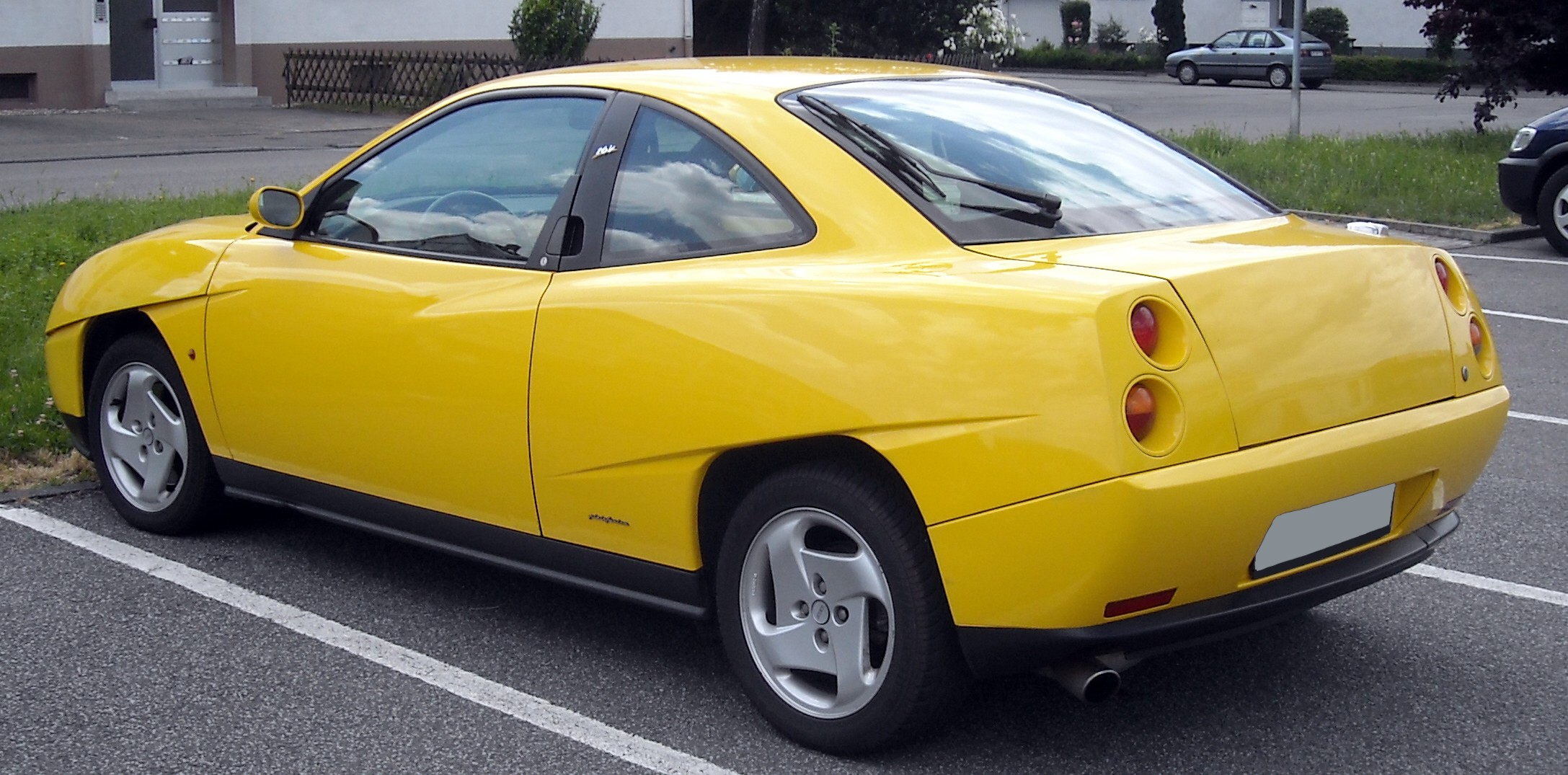
Rear of the Fiat Coupé

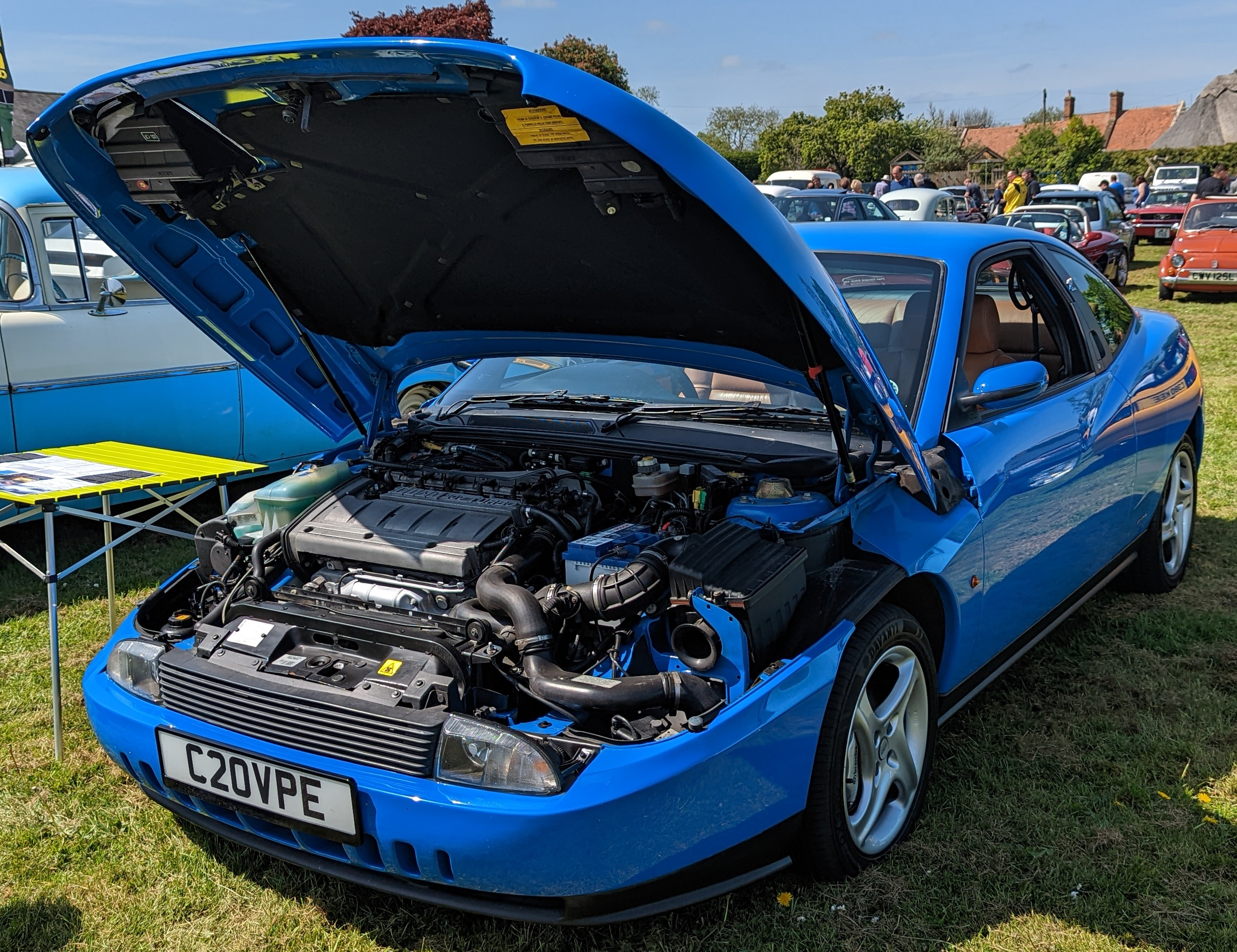
Fiat Coupe 20VT with clamshell bonnet open

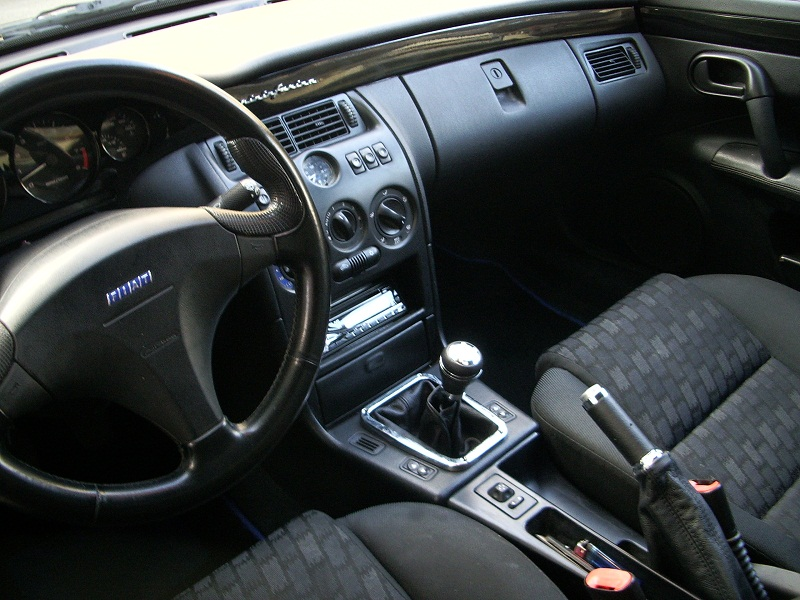
Fiat Coupé's interior

== Engines ==
Model	Engine	Displacement	Power	Torque	0–100 km/h (0–62 mph)	Top speed
1.8 16V	I4	1747 cc	131 PS (96 kW; 129 hp) at 6300 rpm	164 N⋅m (121 lb⋅ft) at 4300 rpm	9.2 s	205 km/h (127 mph)
2.0 16V	I4	1995 cc	139 PS (102 kW; 137 hp) at 6000 rpm	180 N⋅m (133 lb⋅ft) at 4500 rpm	9.2 s	208 km/h (129 mph)
2.0 20V	I5	1998 cc	147 PS (108 kW; 145 hp) at 6100 rpm	186 N⋅m (137 lb⋅ft) at 4500 rpm	8.9 s	212 km/h (132 mph)
2.0 20V V.I.S.	I5	1998 cc	154 PS (113 kW; 152 hp) at 6700 rpm	186 N⋅m (137 lb⋅ft) at 3750 rpm	8.4 s	217 km/h (135 mph)
2.0 16V Turbo	I4	1995 cc	190 PS (140 kW; 187 hp) at 5500 rpm	290 N⋅m (214 lb⋅ft) at 3400 rpm	7.5 s	225 km/h (140 mph)
2.0 20V Turbo	I5	1998 cc	220 PS (162 kW; 217 hp) at 5750 rpm	310 N⋅m (229 lb⋅ft) at 2500 rpm	6.3 s	240 km/h (149 mph) (5-speed); 250 km/h (155 mph) (6-speed)
