= Chris Bangle =

American automobile designer

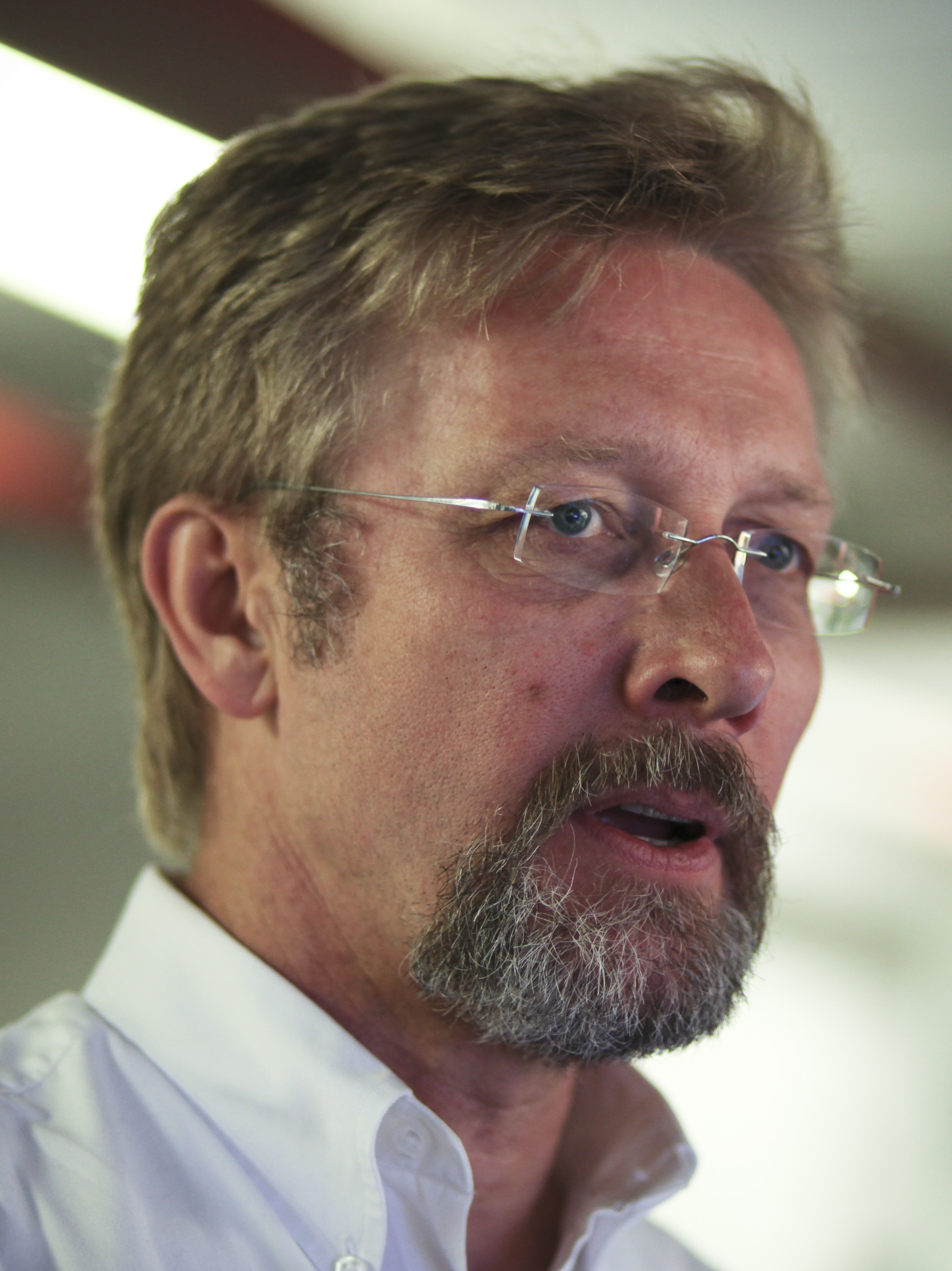
- Bangle in 2009
- Born: Christopher Edward Bangle; October 14, 1956 (age 70); Ravenna, Ohio, U.S.
- Occupation: Automobile designer

Christopher Edward Bangle (born October 14, 1956) is an American automobile designer. Bangle is known best for his work as Chief of Design for BMW Group, where he was responsible for the BMW, MINI and Rolls-Royce motor cars.

== Early life ==
Bangle was born in Ravenna, Ohio, and raised in Wausau, Wisconsin. After considering becoming a Methodist minister, Bangle attended the Art Center College of Design in Pasadena, California, earning a Bachelor of Science degree.

== Career ==
=== Opel ===
Bangle started his career at Opel in Germany, where he worked from 1981 until 1985. The first work that he designed is the interior of the Opel Junior concept car.

=== Fiat ===
He moved to Fiat in Italy in 1985, to work on the second generation Fiat Panda (released 2003). From 1990 he worked as a chief designer of the Fiat Coupé (released 1993). Still in Centro Stile Fiat he designed Alfa Romeo 145.

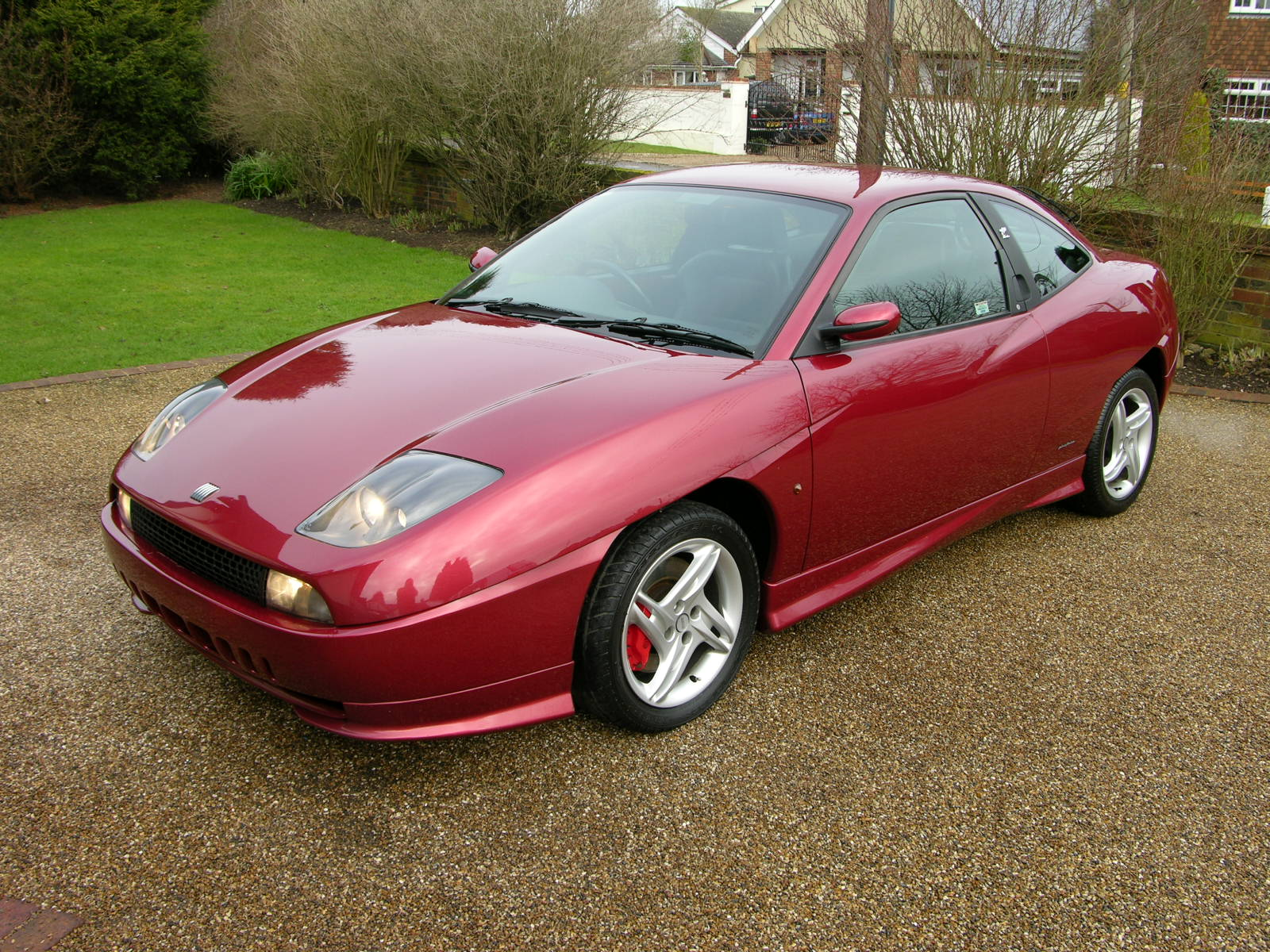
Fiat Coupé

=== BMW ===
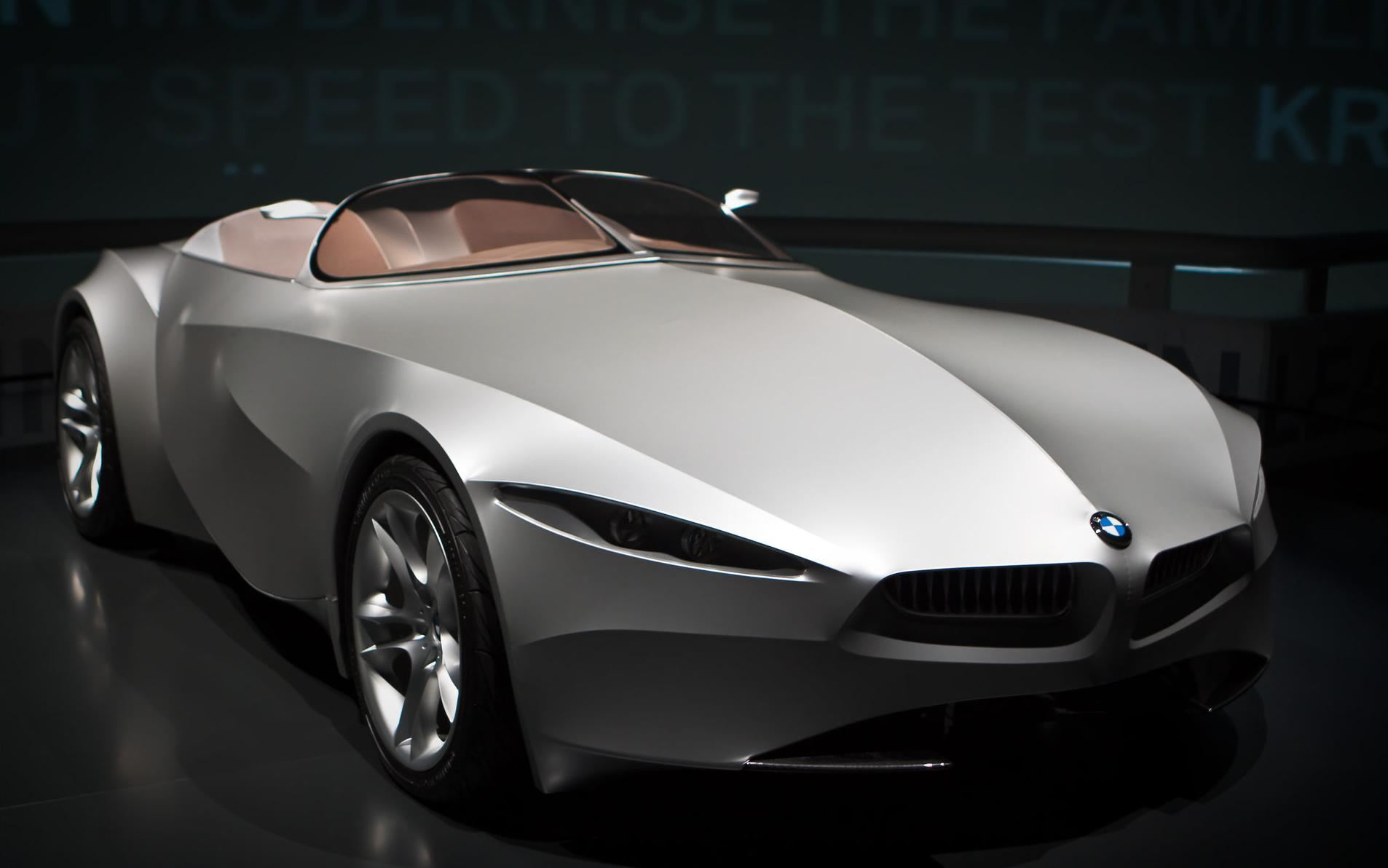
BMW GINA

He became the first American chief of design of BMW on October 1, 1992, where he designed the Z9 Gran Turismo concept car.

Bangle's designs were incorporated in the entire BMW lineup, including the BMW Z4, 1, 3, 5, 6 and 7 series as well as the X3, X5, and X6 the newest design SUVs, and the concept car Gina. These span the automotive platforms E81 / E82 / E87 / E88, E90 / E91 / E92 / E93, E60 / E61, E63 / E64, E65 / E66 and E53. During the Bangle era, BMW overtook Mercedes as the global leader in premium car sales, despite Bangle's controversial design language.

He introduced a new BMW concept car, called GINA on June 10, 2008.

On February 3, 2009, Bangle announced that he was to quit both his position at BMW and the auto industry altogether, to focus on his own design-related endeavours. He was replaced by Adrian van Hooydonk.

=== Post-BMW ===
Bangle now works for his own firm called Chris Bangle Associates based in Clavesana, Italy.

In 2012, Bangle was hired by Samsung.

== Design philosophy ==
His styling themes have generated intense controversy among automotive designers, and have had a polarizing effect with respect to their visual cues. Bangle acknowledges that his designs do not look good in photographs, suggesting to critics that they should see the cars in real life before judging them on their looks.

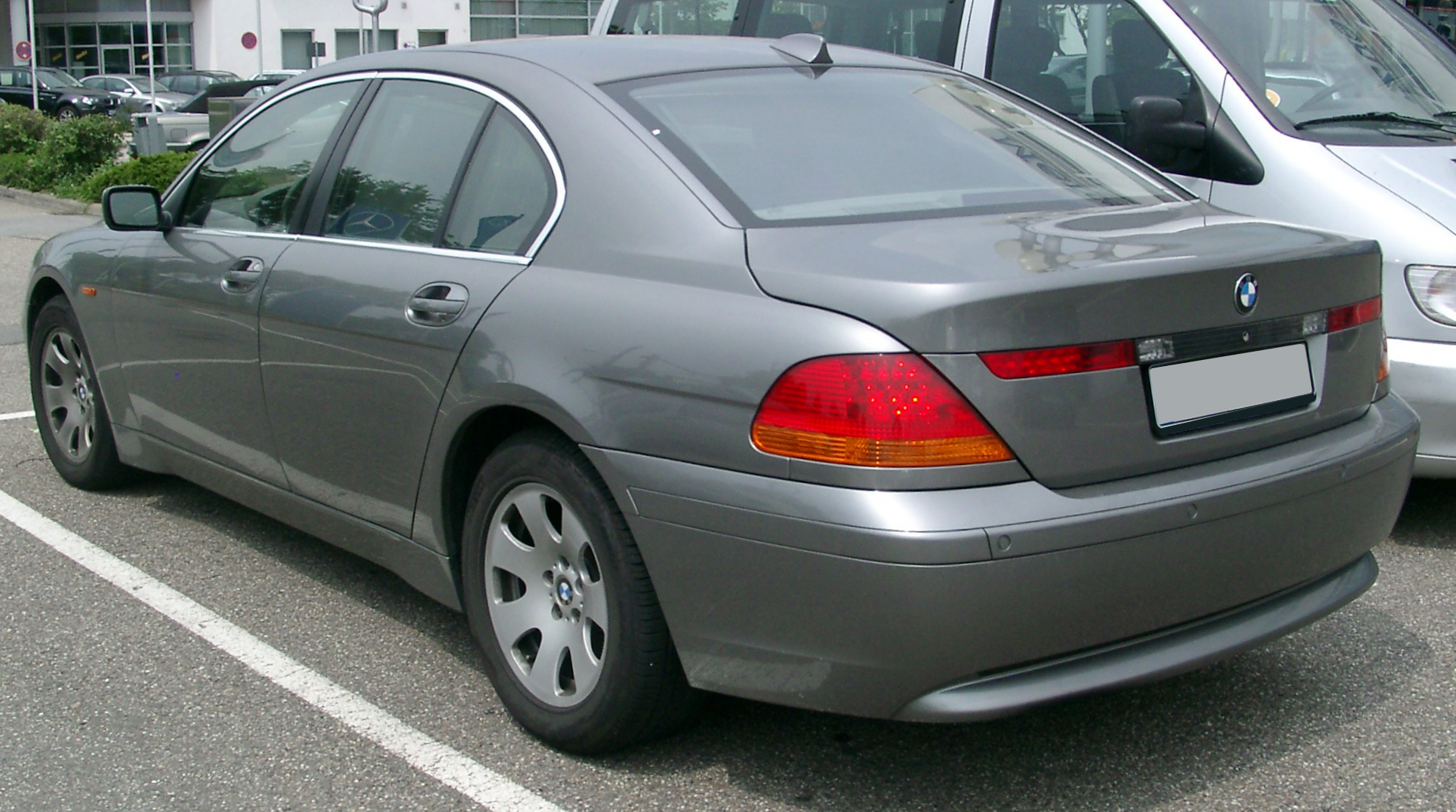
BMW E65 rear view

Bangle himself did not (as is commonly believed) coin the phrase "flame surfacing" to describe his work; this can be attributed to a motoring journalist, and is probably the first time Deconstructivism has been adapted to automotive design. The reason for this design was to use BMW's new technology of 3D panel pressing allowing a single press for compound curves, which had previously needed multiple pressings unless the panel was shaped by hand. This is further evidenced by the fact that Bangle has often pointed out architect Frank Gehry's work as a major influence.

Arguably the most controversial of Bangle and van Hooydonk's work was the E65 7 Series, a sharp contrast to the preceding E38 generation which was conservatively styled. In fact, van Hooydonk's original 1998 sketch for the E65 was a much more radical sleek fastback, but the final design was toned down considerably to resemble a more conventional three-box sedan. Time magazine named the E65 as one of the 50 Worst Cars of All Time for its rear end styling and iDrive functionality, while there were several online petitions pressing BMW to sack Bangle. While the sales for the 2002 and 2003 models years were off 60% from the 2001, the E65 7 series became the best-selling 7 Series of all time.

Bangle aggressively defended his designs against criticism. He was supported by the BMW board of directors, who wanted to move BMW's image into the future. He said it was necessary for product lines to follow a cycle of a revolutionary generation followed by an evolutionary generation followed by another revolutionary generation and so on. Indeed, he oversaw the conservative evolution of BMW designs with the redesign of the BMW 3 Series and the introduction of the BMW X5. For Bangle this marked the end of this evolutionary era of BMW design and the revolution was witnessed with the 2002 introduction of the BMW E65.

=== Peer comments ===
- J Mays, Ford's chief creative officer, dislikes Bangle's designs, but admits Bangle has been significant in reshaping modern cars.
- Marc Newson, an industrial designer and car enthusiast, described Bangle's BMW Z4 (E85) as having been designed with a machete.
- Patrick le Quément, chief designer at Renault, said: "[Bangle is] certainly the most talked about designer. His designs have a great deal of presence, and they're well proportioned. He's been highly influential. My only concern is his use of concave surfaces: they're hollow shapes and lack that tightly muscled look I feel helps design."
- Martin Smith, head of design for Ford of Europe, describes Bangle as an instigator of the trend toward "surface entertainment" in cars; the Ford Iosis bears some resemblance to Bangle-styled BMWs but it was not criticized as much as Bangle's designs.
- Klaus Draeger, BMW AG's Board Member for Development, said: "Christopher Bangle has had a lasting impact on the identity of BMW Group's brands. His contribution to the company's success has been decisive, and together with his teams he has mapped out a clear and aesthetic route into the future,"
- Robert Cumberford, former GM designer and Design Editor for Automobile, wrote in 2004 that Bangle is "a man with the courage of his convictions and of solid character, and he is worthy of our admiration for that alone."
