= International Technical Development Center =

German research center

- Land Hesse, Germany
- Location: Rüsselsheim, Hesse
- Coordinates: 49.9871°N 8.4045°E
- Industry: Automotive
- Employees: 6,000
- Owner: Opel Automobile GmbH

The International Technical Development Center (ITDC, German Internationales Technisches Entwicklungszentrum ITEZ) is one of the engineering and design centers of Groupe PSA, and was the main engineering and design centre of General Motors in Europe, having been sold with the complete Opel/Vauxhall automobile business and the two brands Opel and Vauxhall to the Groupe PSA by August 1, 2017.

== Structure ==
It is situated in Rüsselsheim am Main (Ruesselsheim) in the Frankfurt Rhine-Main of Hesse, Germany. It is situated next to the Opel Rüsselsheim Plant, separated only by the Mainbahn railway line. Next to it is the European Design Center, and also the Opel business administration.

== Function ==
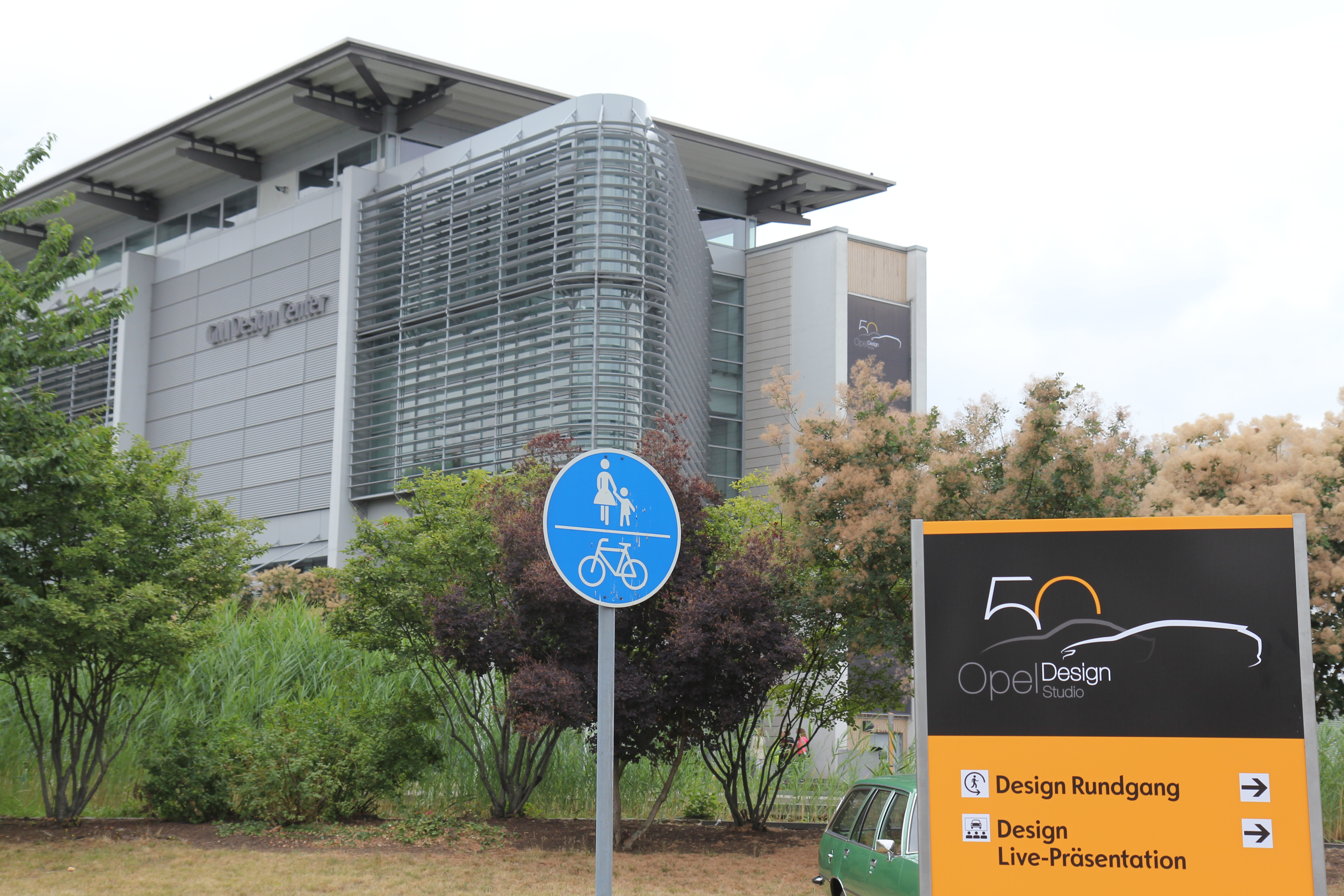
Opel Design Center celebrating 50 years in June 2014

It is one of PSA's technical development and design centers in Europe, being formerly the main design centre for General Motors in Europe. It has been assigned the leading role as "Competence Center" in a number of areas, among them alternative fuels and adaptation for the US market. On April 4, 2018 PSA and Opel announced that a group in the ITEZ would lead the development of a special platform for Light Commercial Vehicles and lead future LCV development from conception to production.
