= BMW 2 Series (G42) =

Compact luxury coupé by BMW

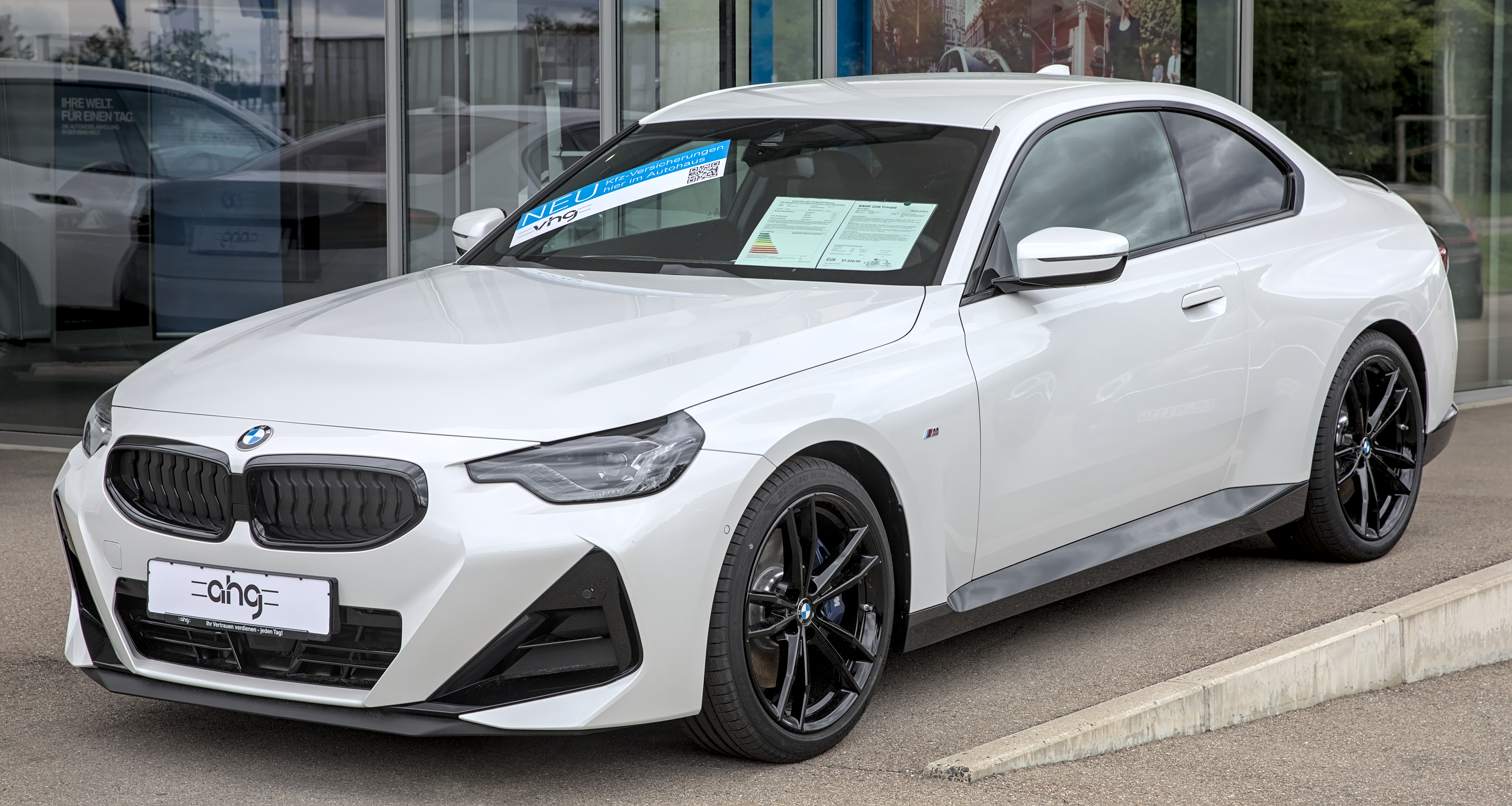
- 2022 BMW 220i

Overview
- Manufacturer: BMW
- Model code: G42
- Production: September 2021 – present
- Model years: 2022–present
- Assembly: Mexico: San Luis Potosí (BMW Group Planta San Luis Potosí)
- Designer: José Casas

Body and chassis
- Class: Sport compact / sports car (S-segment)
- Body style: 2-door coupé
- Layout: Front-engine, rear-wheel-drive; Front-engine, four-wheel-drive (xDrive)
- Platform: BMW CLAR platform
- Related: BMW M2 (G87); BMW 3 Series (G20); BMW 4 Series (G22)

Powertrain
- Engine: Petrol: 2.0 L B48 I4 turbo; 3.0 L B58 I6 turbo; 3.0 L S58 I6 turbo; Diesel: 2.0 L B47 I4 turbo
- Transmission: 8-speed ZF 8HP automatic; 6-speed manual transmission

Dimensions
- Wheelbase: 2,741 mm (107.9 in)
- Length: 4,547 mm (179.0 in)
- Width: 1,839 mm (72.4 in)
- Height: 1,418 mm (55.8 in)

Chronology
- Predecessor: BMW 2 Series (F22/F23)

The BMW 2 Series (G42) is the second generation of the BMW 2 Series subcompact coupé, the successor in 2021 to the F22 2 Series coupé and convertible. The G42 is the first BMW vehicle designed by BMW of Mexico, and is produced in BMW's plant in San Luis Potosí, Mexico since 2 September 2021.

== Development and launch ==
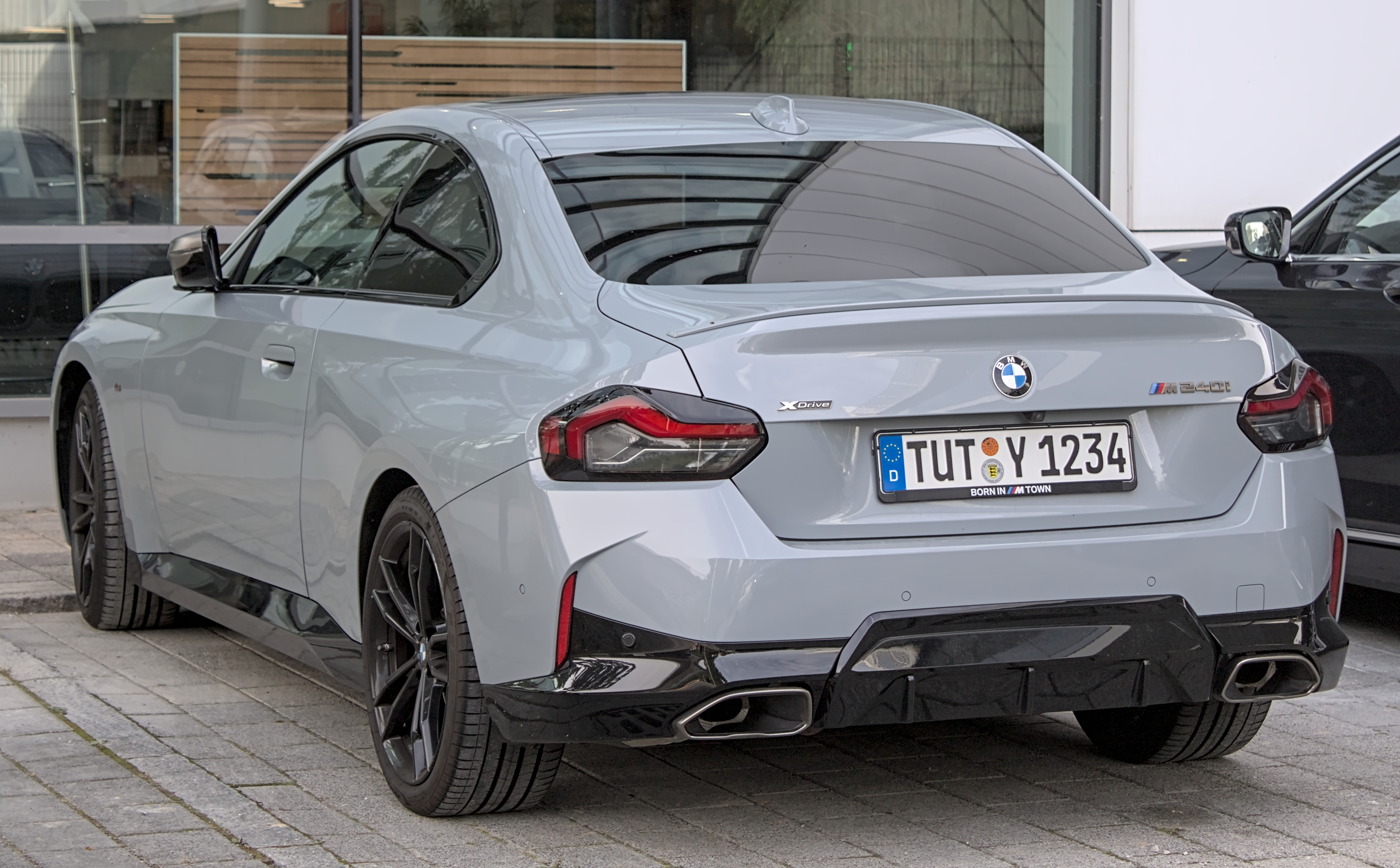
2022 BMW M240i

Remaining a rear-wheel-drive-based model, the G42 is built on the CLAR platform with a roughly 50:50 weight distribution and shares many mechanical components and engine options with the G20 3 Series and G22 4 Series. Unlike its predecessor, the base second-generation 2 Series and M240i coupé is no longer available with a manual transmission and not complemented with a convertible body style. The launch models consist of the mild hybrid diesel engine 220d, the petrol engine 220i and 230i and the M240i xDrive.

== Equipment ==
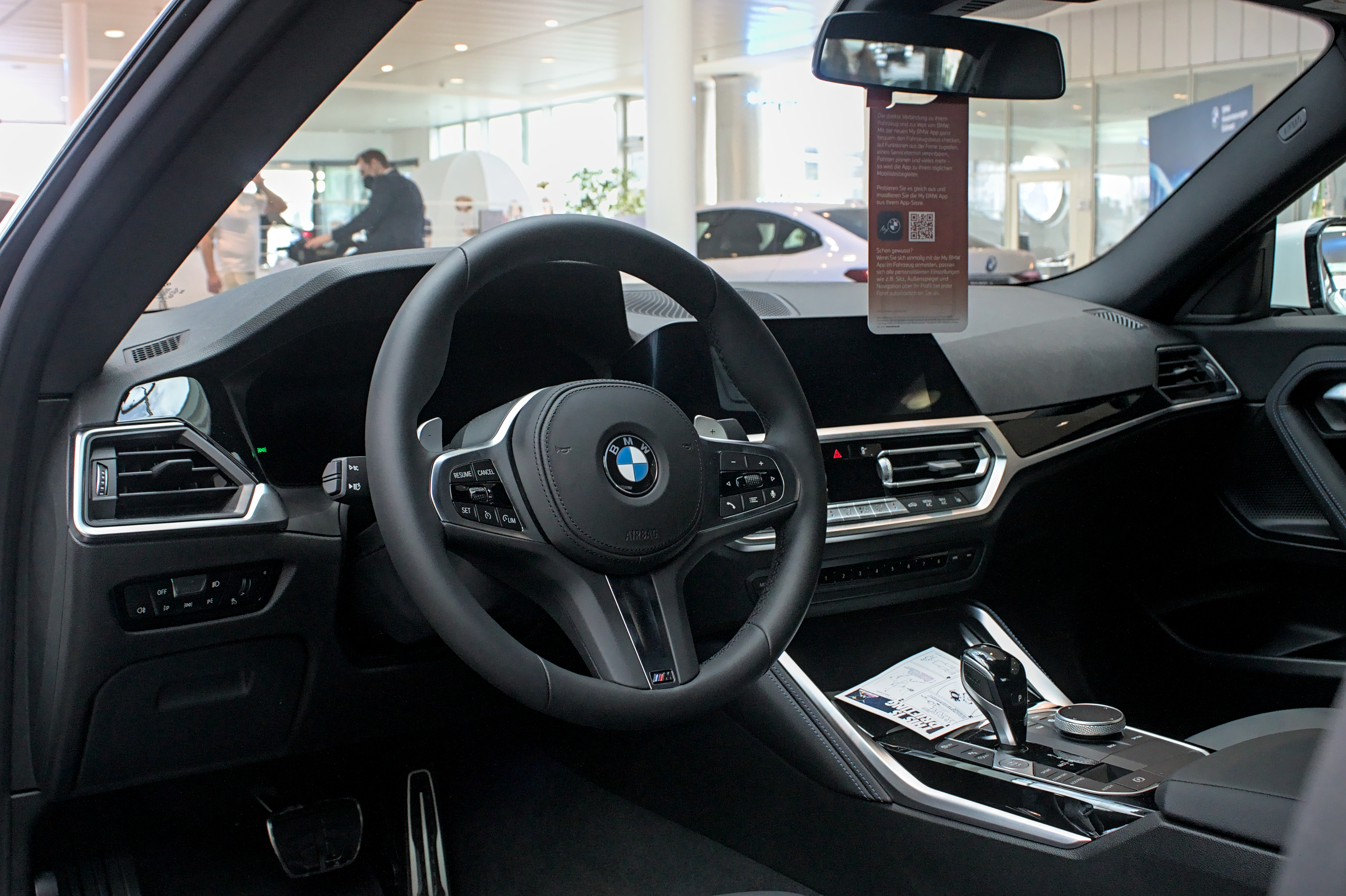
Interior (2021-2022)

Standard equipment in the US market includes Apple CarPlay, Android Auto, 10 speaker stereo, adaptive cruise control, tyre pressure monitor and Active Driving Assistant. What Car? found that the rotary controller for the satellite navigation was less distracting to use than the touchscreen. Top Gear magazine felt that the coupé's physical buttons were more user friendly than the touchscreen interfaces in other BMW models.

=== M Performance Parts ===
218-230 with the M Sport trim and M240i models can be fitted with M Performance Parts. These include a carbon fibre front splitter, side skirts and spoiler, M rims, a sport steering wheel and a door projector.

== Models ==
=== Petrol engines ===
Model	Layout	Years	Engine	Power	Torque
218i	Rear wheel drive	2022–	BMW B48; 2.0 L I4 turbo	115 kW (154 hp) at 4,500–6,500 rpm	250 N⋅m (180 lbf⋅ft) at 1,300–4,300 rpm
220i	Rear wheel drive	2021–	B48B20M0; 2.0 L I4 turbo	135 kW (181 hp) at 5,000–6,500 rpm	300 N⋅m (220 lbf⋅ft) at 1,350–4,000 rpm
230i	Rear wheel drive	2021–	B48O1ZIK; 2.0 L I4 turbo	180 kW (240 hp) / 190 kW (250 hp) (USA) at 4,500–6,500 rpm	400 N⋅m (300 lbf⋅ft) at 1,600–4,000 rpm
230i xDrive	All wheel drive	2022–	B48O1ZIK; 2.0 L I4 turbo	180 kW (240 hp) / 190 kW (250 hp) (USA) at 4,500–6,500 rpm	400 N⋅m (300 lbf⋅ft) at 1,600–4,000 rpm
M240i	Rear wheel drive	2022–	B58B30O1; 3.0 L I6 turbo	285 kW (382 hp) / 275 kW (369 hp) (Europe) at 5,800–6,500 rpm	500 N⋅m (370 lbf⋅ft) at 1,800–5,000 rpm
M240i xDrive	All wheel drive	2021–	B58B30O1; 3.0 L I6 turbo	285 kW (382 hp) / 275 kW (369 hp) (Europe) at 5,800–6,500 rpm	500 N⋅m (370 lbf⋅ft) at 1,800–5,000 rpm

=== Diesel engines ===
Model	Layout	Years	Engine	Power	Torque
220d	Rear wheel drive	2021–	B47D20; 2.0 L I4 turbo	140 kW (190 hp) at 4,000 rpm	400 N⋅m (300 lbf⋅ft) at 1,750–2,500 rpm

== BMW M2 ==
=== M2 (G87) ===
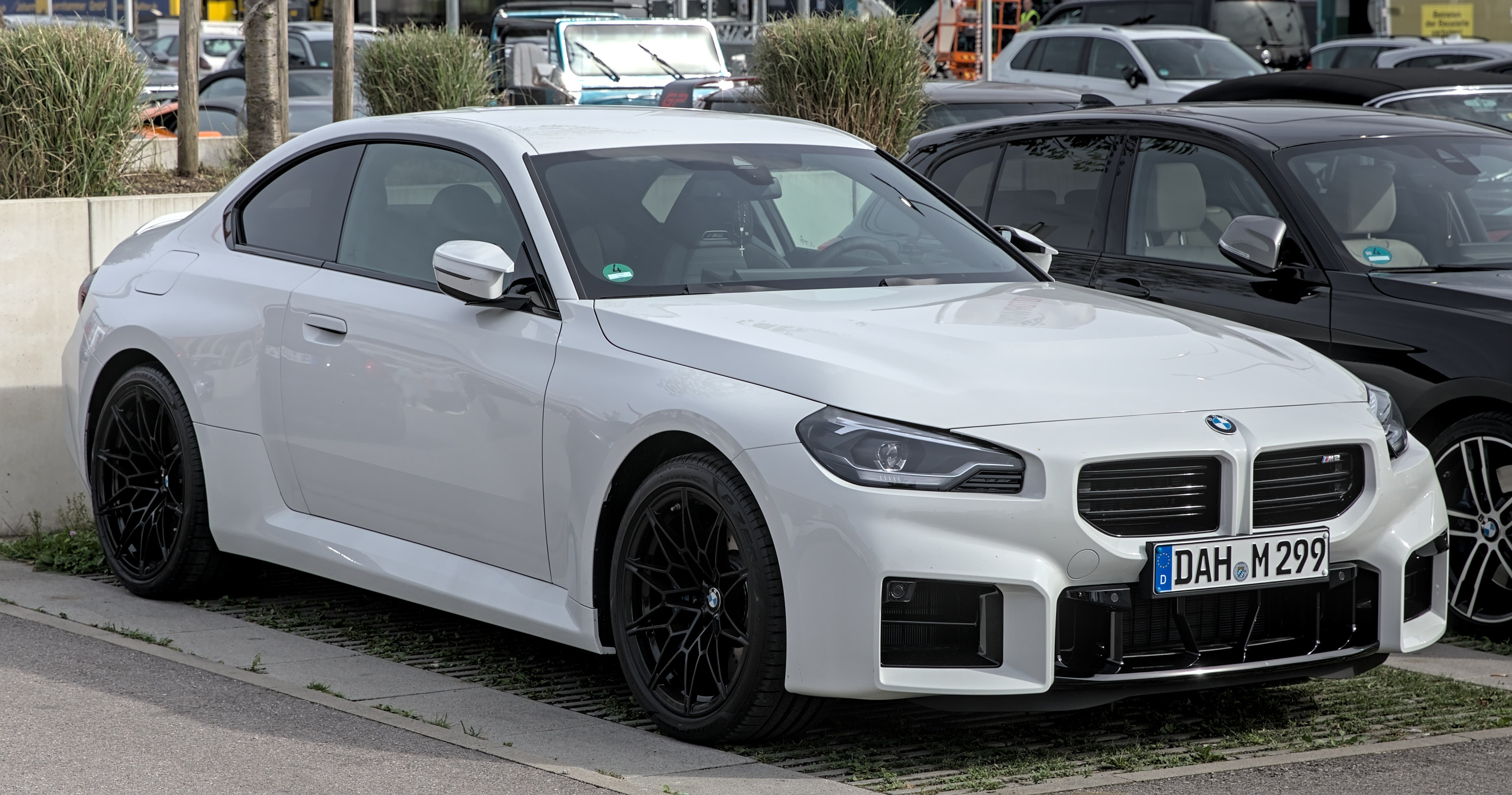
BMW M2 (G87)

In October 2022, BMW revealed the second generation of the high-performance M2, with sales beginning in 2023. Like its predecessor, it has both manual and automatic transmissions. It uses the twin-turbo S58 engine, which has been detuned compared to the M3 and M4 models.

== Safety ==
Euro NCAP test results BMW 2 Series Coupé 2.0 diesel (LHD) (2022)
Test	Points	%
Overall:	4 /5 stars	
Adult occupant:	31.3	82%
Child occupant:	40.1	81%
Pedestrian:	36.6	67%
Safety assist:	10.2	64%

== Engine ==
In 2025 the BMW M2 G87 Competition comes in two variants, manual and automatic transmission. It is powered by a 3.0-litre M Twin-Turbocharged Inline-6 engine (2993 cc) that produces 473 bhp and 600 Nm of torque.

== See also ==
- List of BMW vehicles
