= BMW M2 =

High-performance version of the BMW 2 Series

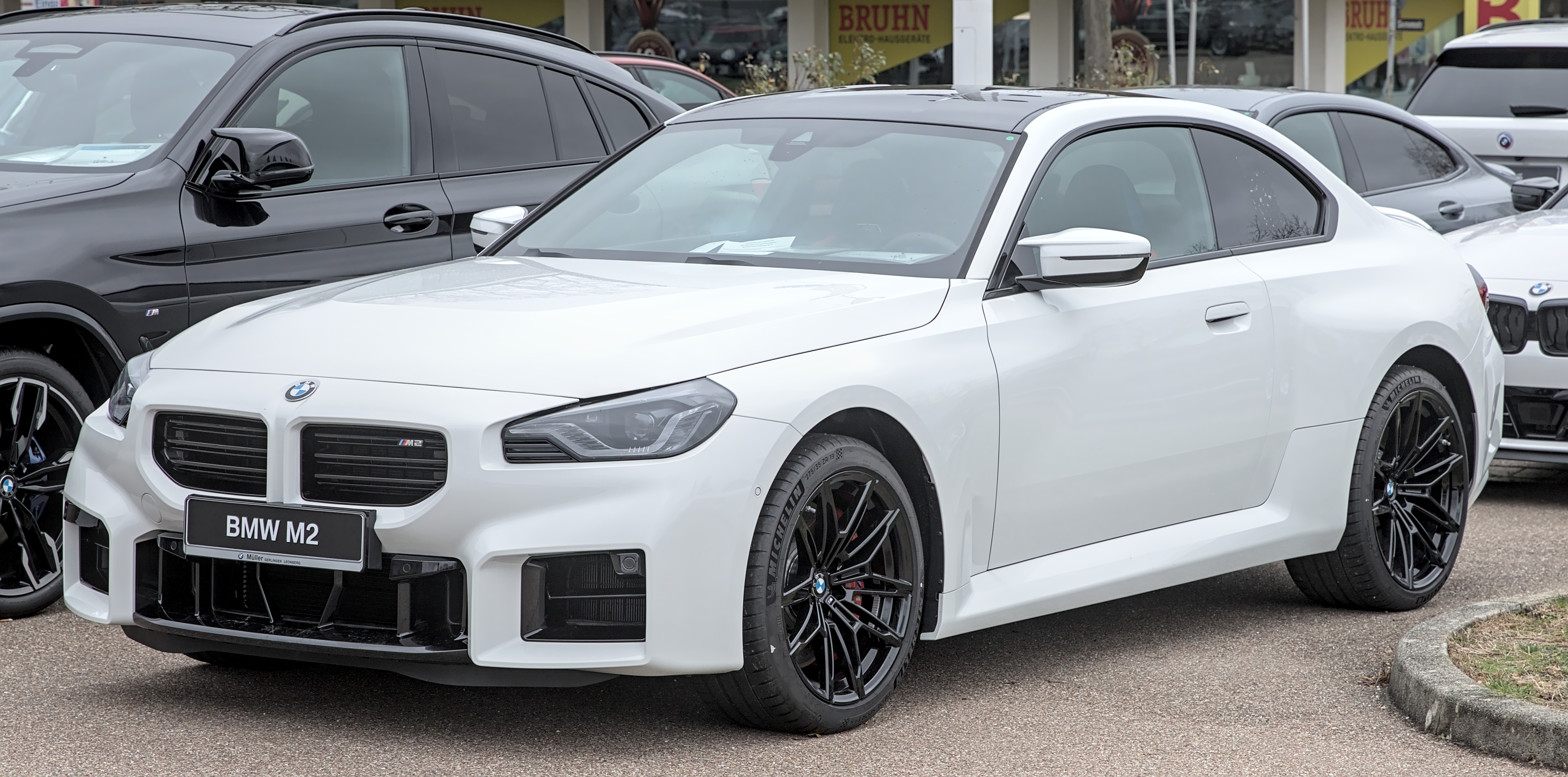

Overview
- Manufacturer: BMW M
- Production: 2016–2021, 2023–present

Body and chassis
- Class: Sports car
- Body style: 2-door coupe
- Layout: Front-engine, rear-wheel-drive Front-engine, all-wheel drive (M xDrive, 2026–present)

Chronology
- Predecessor: BMW 1 Series M Coupe

The BMW M2 is a high-performance version of the BMW 2 Series automobile developed by BMW's motorsport division, BMW M GmbH. As the 2 Series replaced the 1 Series coupé and convertible models, the first-generation M2 was marketed as the most basic M model in the range.

The first-generation M2 used the F2x chassis from the 1 Series, codenamed F87 and featured the BMW N55 series engine, while its successors, the M2 Competition and M2 CS, featured a twin-turbocharged engine developed by BMW M GmbH (S55 engine).

The second-generation M2 uses the CLAR platform, codenamed G87, which it shares with the G80 M3 and G82 M4. It features the BMW S58 twin-turbocharged inline-six engine, developed by BMW M GmbH.

== First generation (F87; 2016) ==
First generation
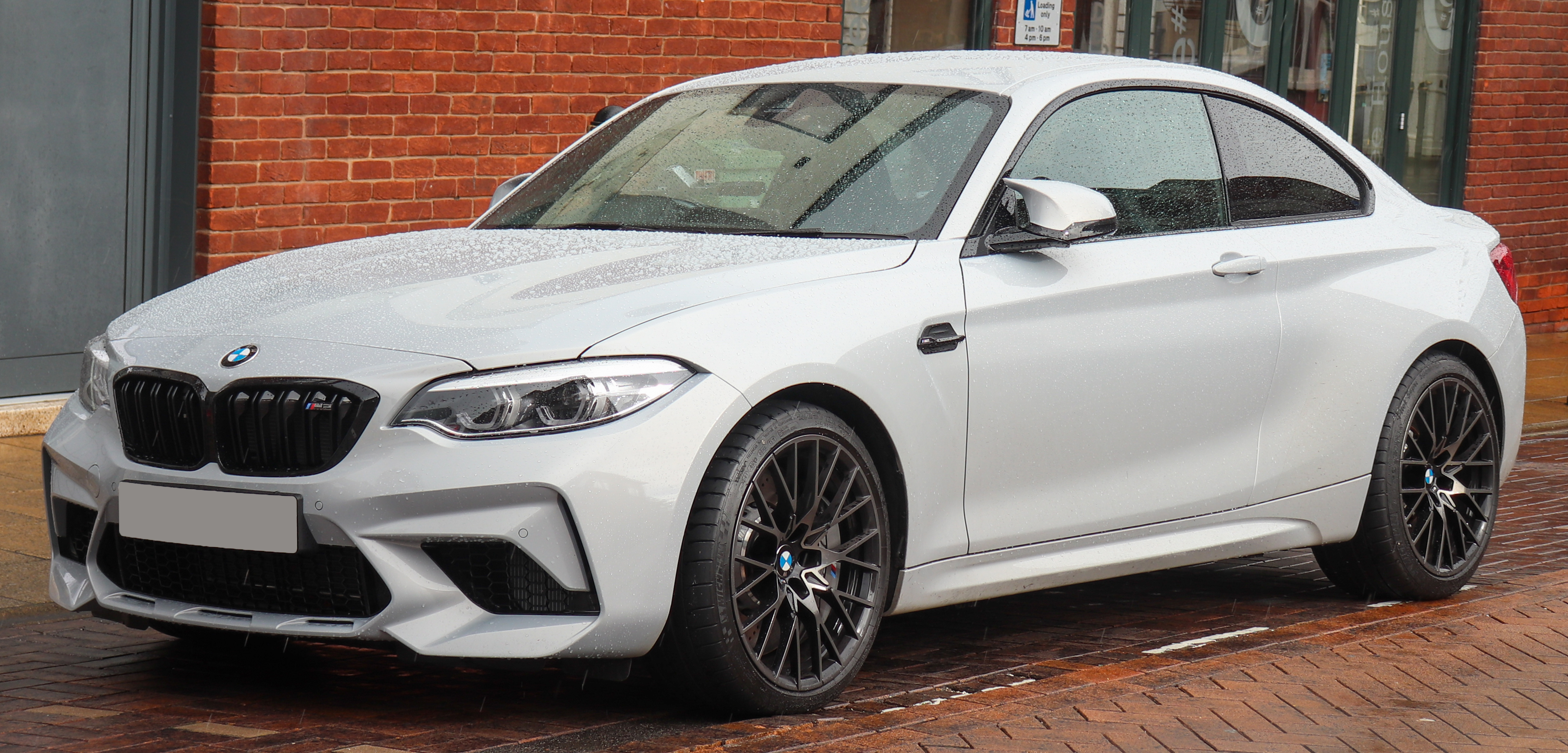
- BMW M2

Overview
- Model code: F87
- Production: 2016–2021
- Assembly: Germany: Leipzig (BMW Group Plant Leipzig)
- Designer: Hussein Al-Attar

Body and chassis
- Related: BMW 2 Series (F22)

Powertrain
- Engine: 3.0 L N55B30T0 turbo I6; 3.0 L S55B30T0 twin-turbo I6 (Competition & CS)
- Transmission: 6-speed manual; 7-speed M-DCT dual-clutch

Dimensions
- Wheelbase: 2,693 mm (106.0 in)
- Length: 4,468 mm (175.9 in)
- Width: 1,854 mm (73.0 in)
- Height: 1,410 mm (56 in)
- Curb weight: 1,495 kg (3,296 lb); 1,650 kg (3,640 lb) (Competition DCT)

=== BMW M2 Coupé ===
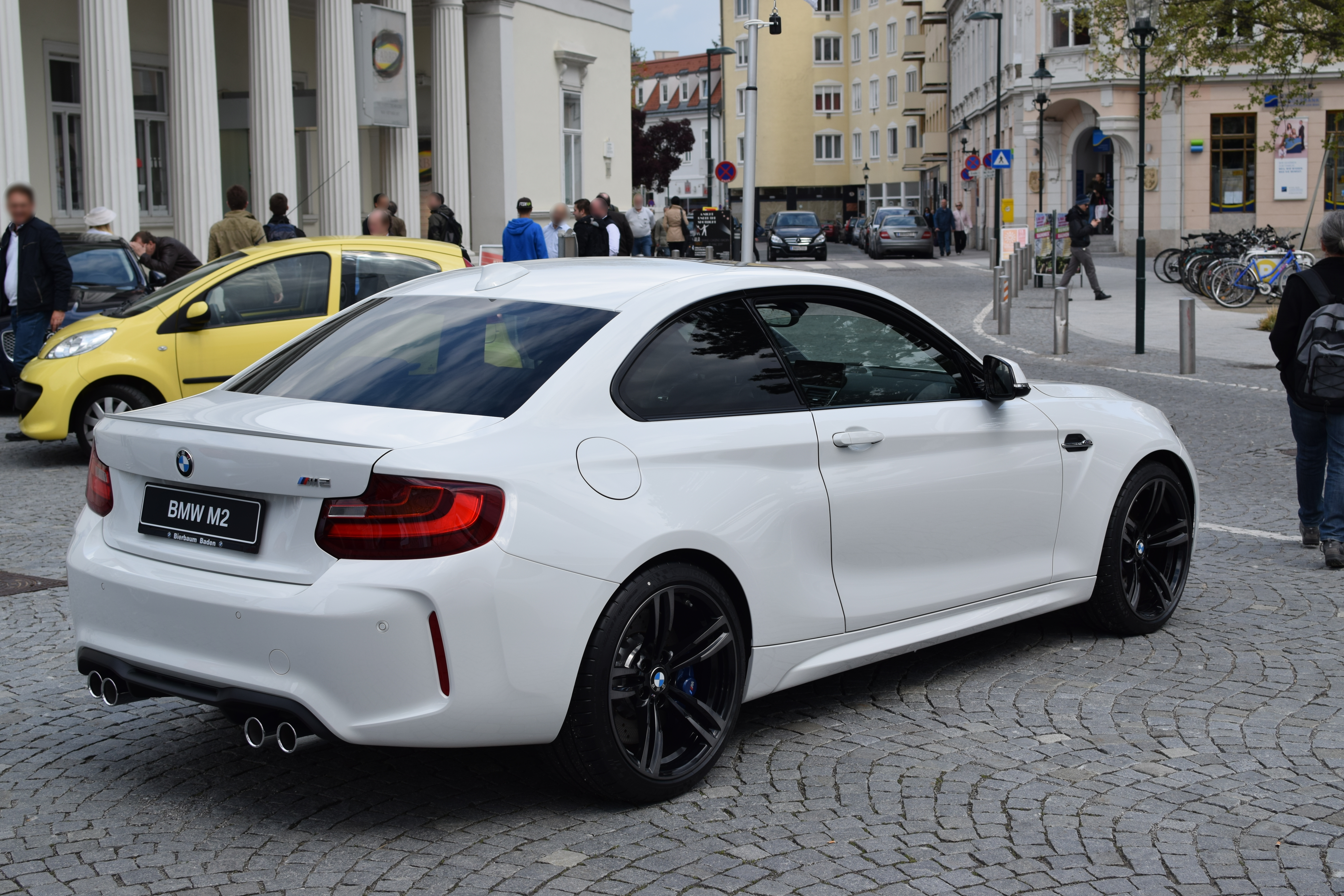
Rear view (BMW M2)

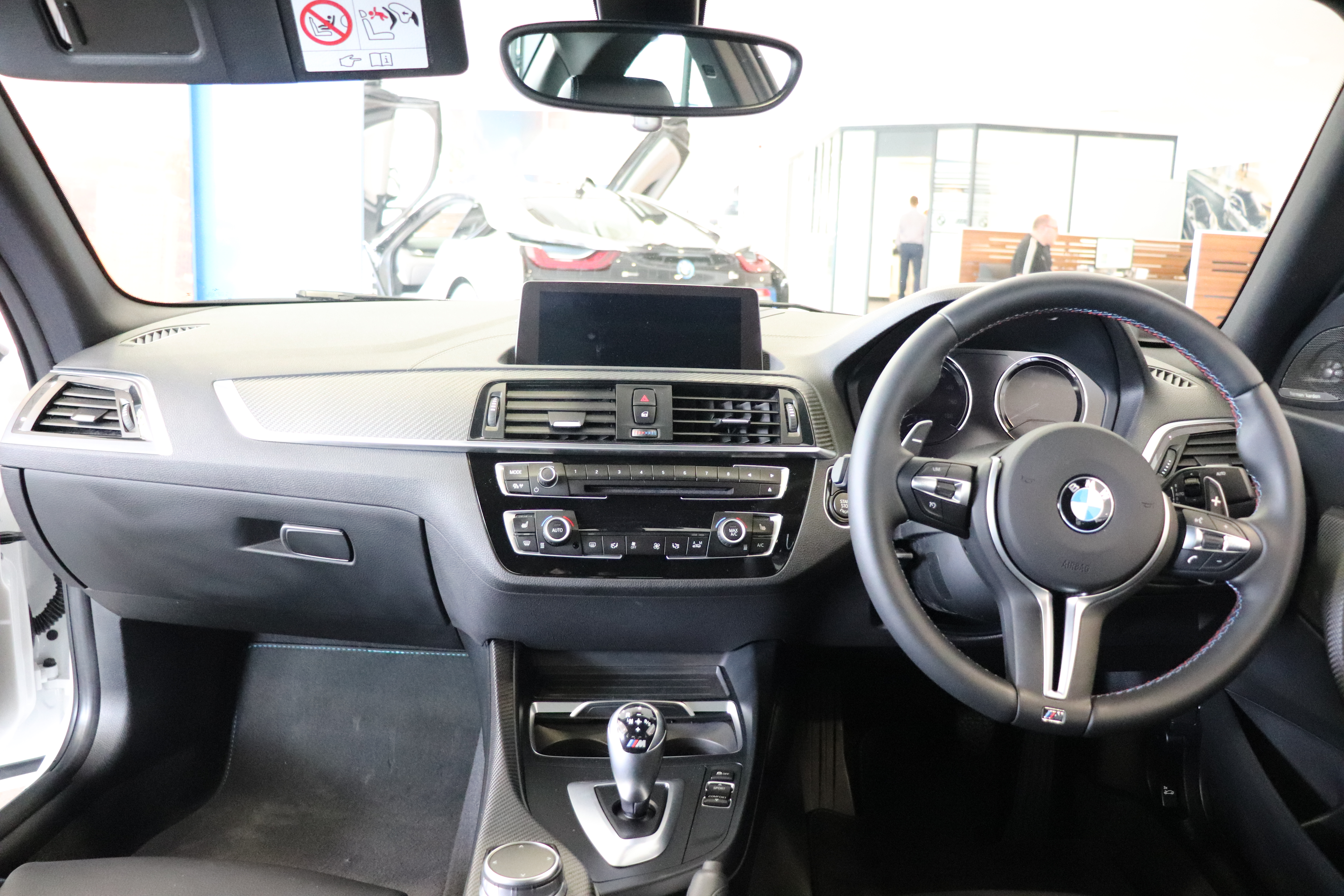
Interior (BMW M2)

The M2 was unveiled in Need for Speed in November 2015, before later premiering at the North American International Auto Show in January 2016. Production commenced in October 2015, first delivered early 2016 and the M2 was only available as a rear-wheel drive coupé.

The M2 is powered by the turbocharged 3.0-litre N55B30T0 straight-six engine rated at 272 kW (365 hp) at 6,500 rpm and 465 N⋅m (343 lb⋅ft) between 1,450 and 4,750 rpm, while an overboost function temporarily increases torque to 500 N⋅m (369 lb⋅ft). The M2 features forged connecting rods & cast aluminum pistons with reinforced wrist (gudgeon pins), and has lighter aluminium front and rear suspension components resulting in a 5 kg (11 lb) weight reduction.

The M2 was available with a 6-speed manual or with a 7-speed automatic dual-clutch transmission. 0–100 km/h acceleration times are 4.5 seconds when equipped with the manual transmission models and 4.3 seconds for models equipped with the 7-speed dual-clutch automatic transmission. Top speed is limited to 250 km/h (155 mph) but could be extended to 270 km/h (168 mph) with the optional M Driver's package. The M2 was used as a safety car in the 2016 MotoGP season.

The BMW M2 could be fitted with M Performance Parts. This includes a splitter, side skirts, fenders, bonnet, boot and a spoiler.

=== BMW M2 Performance Edition ===
150 examples produced for the US market. The car is finished in Alpine White over black Dakota leather, and power is provided by a turbocharged 3.0-liter inline-six paired with a 7-speed dual-clutch transmission or 6-speed manual transmission. Performance Edition equipment includes an M Performance coilover suspension and exhaust system with titanium tips, along with black trim, manually-adjustable front sport seats, an M Performance sport and track key.

All 150 Performance Editions were finished in Alpine White with Shadowline trim. Additional equipment includes xenon headlights, LED door projectors, a rear spoiler lip, and black-finished kidney grilles, side gills, and mirror caps.

Factory 19-inch Style 437M wheels wear staggered-width Michelin Pilot Super Sport tires. The Performance Edition equipment includes adjustable M Performance coilovers, and braking is handled by blue-finished calipers and cross-drilled rotors that are shared with the M4 F82.

The interior features seats trimmed in black Dakota leather with contrasting blue stitching, while carbon-fiber trim accents the dashboard, center console, and door panels. Manually-adjustable front sport seats are equipped as part of weight savings, along with single-zone automatic climate control, and removal of the smoker's package and Comfort Access proximity key. Factory output was rated at 365 hp (272 kW) and 343 lb-ft of torque, and the top speed was increased from 155 mph (249 km/h) to 168 mph (270 km/h) for the Performance Edition.

A coilover adjustment wrench and rebound adjustment knob were included, along with an M Performance key that activates sport and track mode.

=== BMW M2 Competition ===
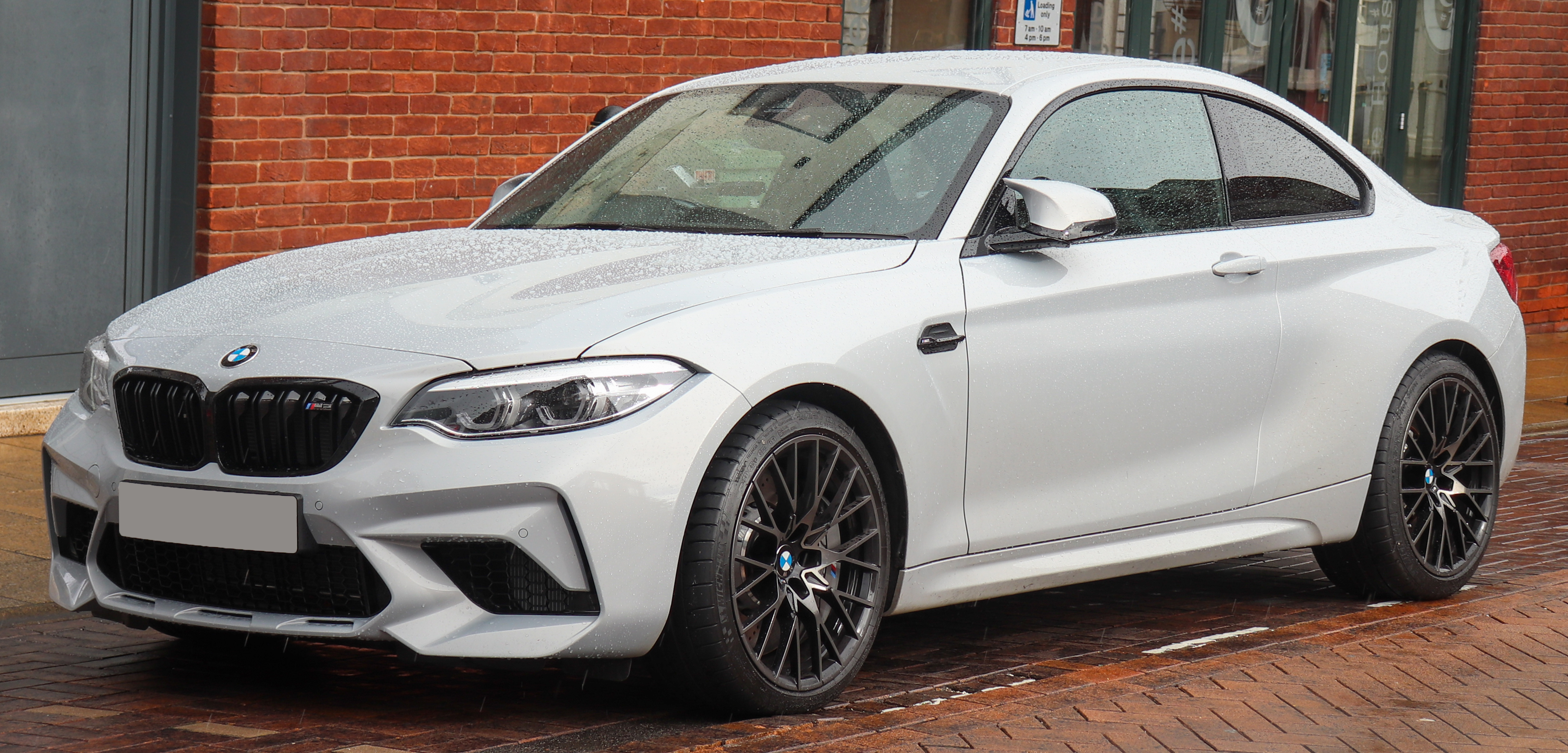
BMW M2 Competition

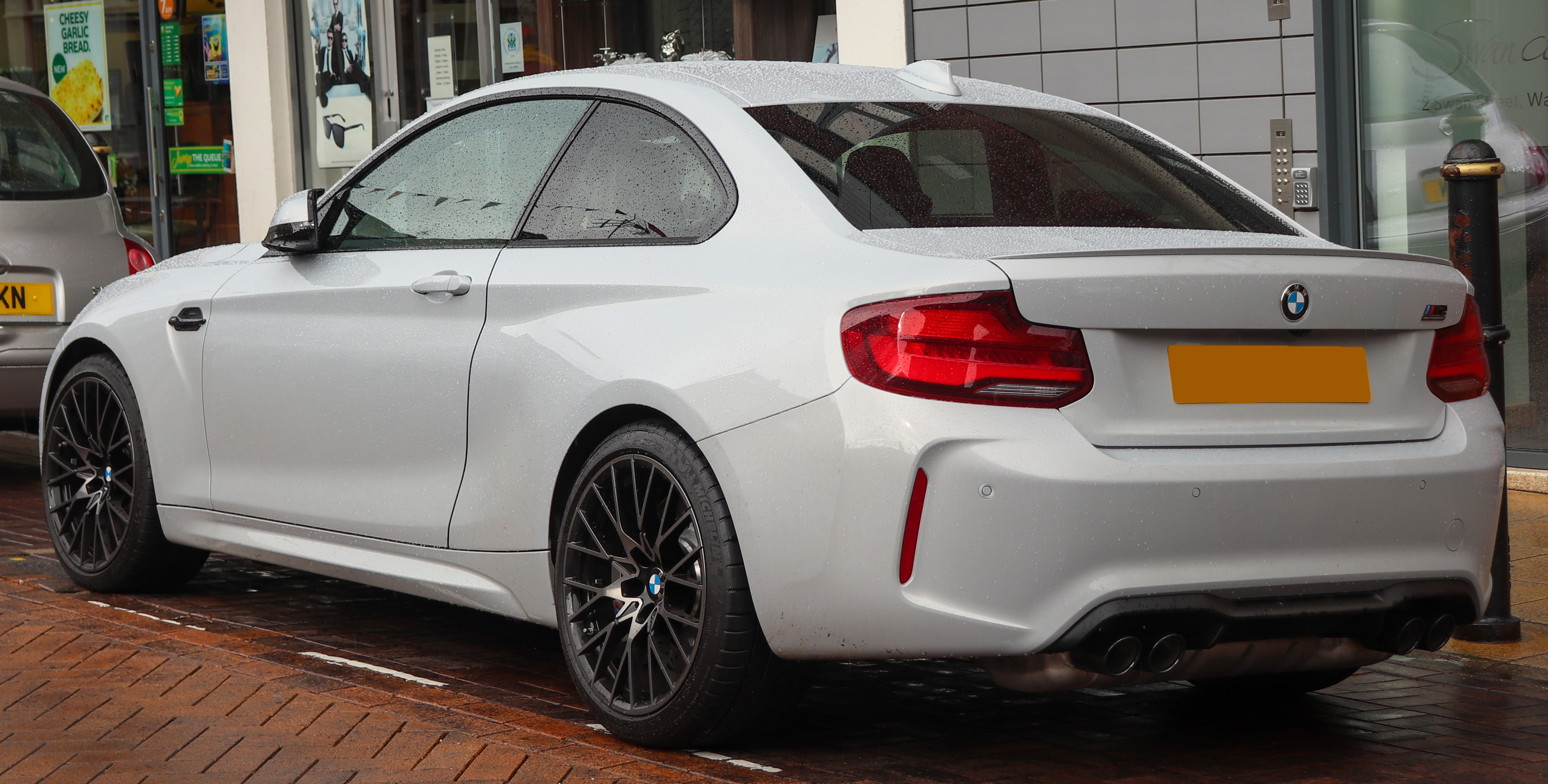
BMW M2 Competition

The BMW M2 Competition was introduced at the 2018 Beijing Auto Show and replaced the standard M2 Coupé as a more powerful variant. Production began first in July 2018, delivered early 2019.

The M2 Competition uses the BMW M GmbH S55 engine, a high-performance variant of the N55 engine, that has been detuned from its application in the F80 M3 and F82 M4. The decision to use the S55 engine was a result of Europe adopting the Worldwide Harmonised Light Vehicles Test Procedure as the official procedure to measure vehicle pollutants, which meant that the standard M2's N55 engine no longer conformed to European emission standards. Differences from the N55 engine found in the standard M2, the S55 includes a closed-deck engine block, lightweight crankshaft, different crankshaft bearings, strengthened pistons and connecting rods, different springs/valve material, twin turbos, twin fuel pumps, active exhaust, revised cooling system and intercoolers. The engine also features a redesigned oil supply system, modified cooling system, and electronic locking differential parts that are adapted from the BMW M4 Competition Package. It also features a gasoline particulate filter in certain European Union countries to reduce emissions. Compared to the standard M2, the S55 produces an additional 30 kW (40 hp) and 85 N⋅m (63 lb⋅ft), resulting in a larger and more sustained power output of 302 kW (411 PS; 405 hp) between 5,250 and 7,000 rpm, and 550 N⋅m (406 lb⋅ft) at 2,350–5,200 rpm. The 0–100 km/h acceleration time is 4.4 seconds for 6-speed manual transmission models, and 4.2 seconds for models with the 7-speed dual-clutch transmission. Top speed is electronically limited to 250 km/h (155 mph), but the M Driver's package can extend the limit to 280 km/h (174 mph) which is 10 km/h (6 mph) higher than in the M2 Performance Edition.

The M2 Competition has the standard carbon-fibre reinforced plastic strut bar found in all S55 engine equipped models, to lighten and stiffen the car, enlarged kidney grilles, and optional larger brake discs of 400 mm (15.7 in) in the front axle with 6-piston calipers and 380 mm (15.0 in) in the rear axle with 4-piston calipers. Because of the engine and cooling system borrowed from the F82 M4, the M2 Competition is 75 kg (165 lb) heavier than the standard M2 which had 1,550 kg (3,417 lb) for manual transmission models and 1,575 kg (3,472 lb) for dual-clutch transmission models.

=== BMW M2 CS ===
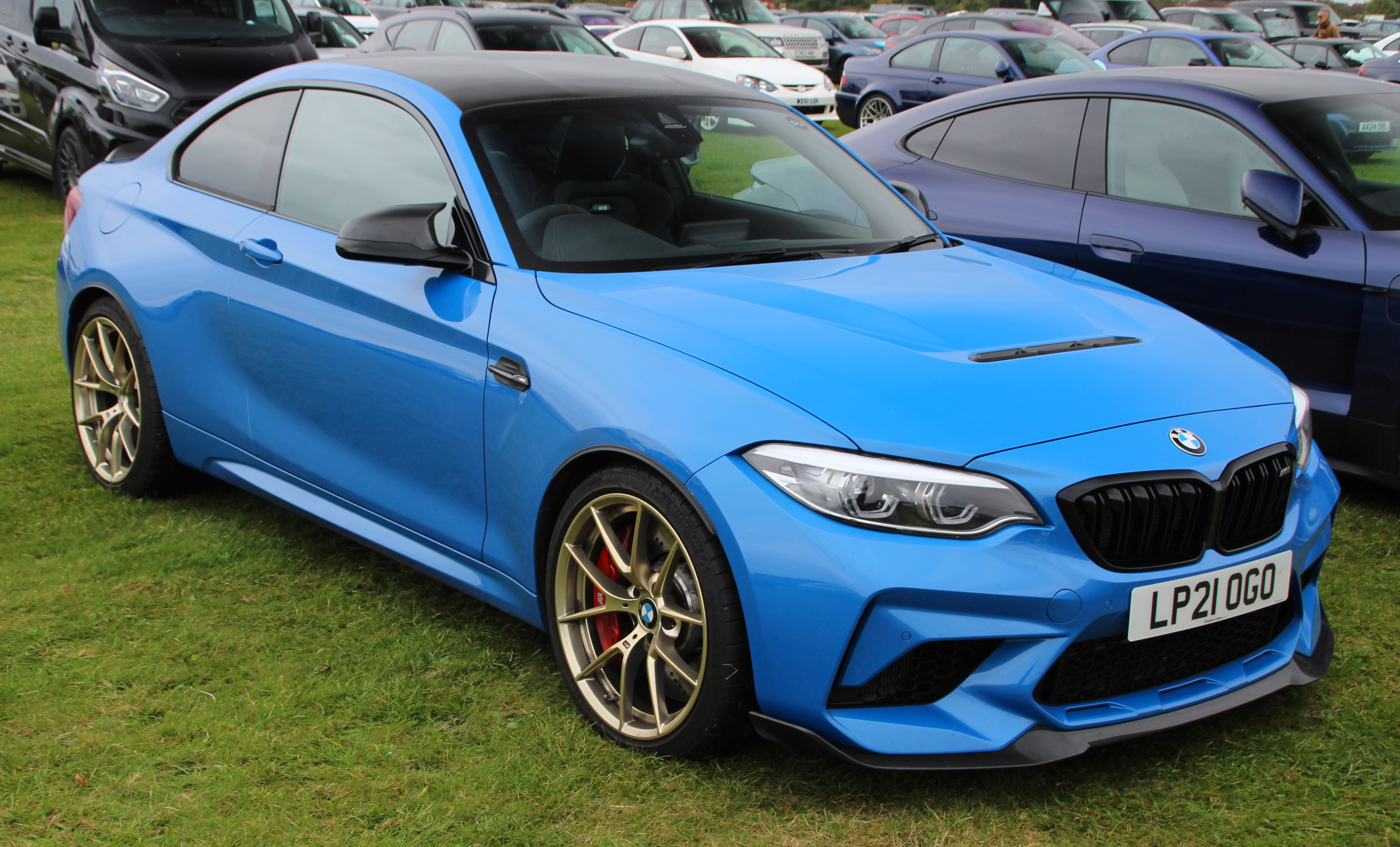
BMW M2 CS

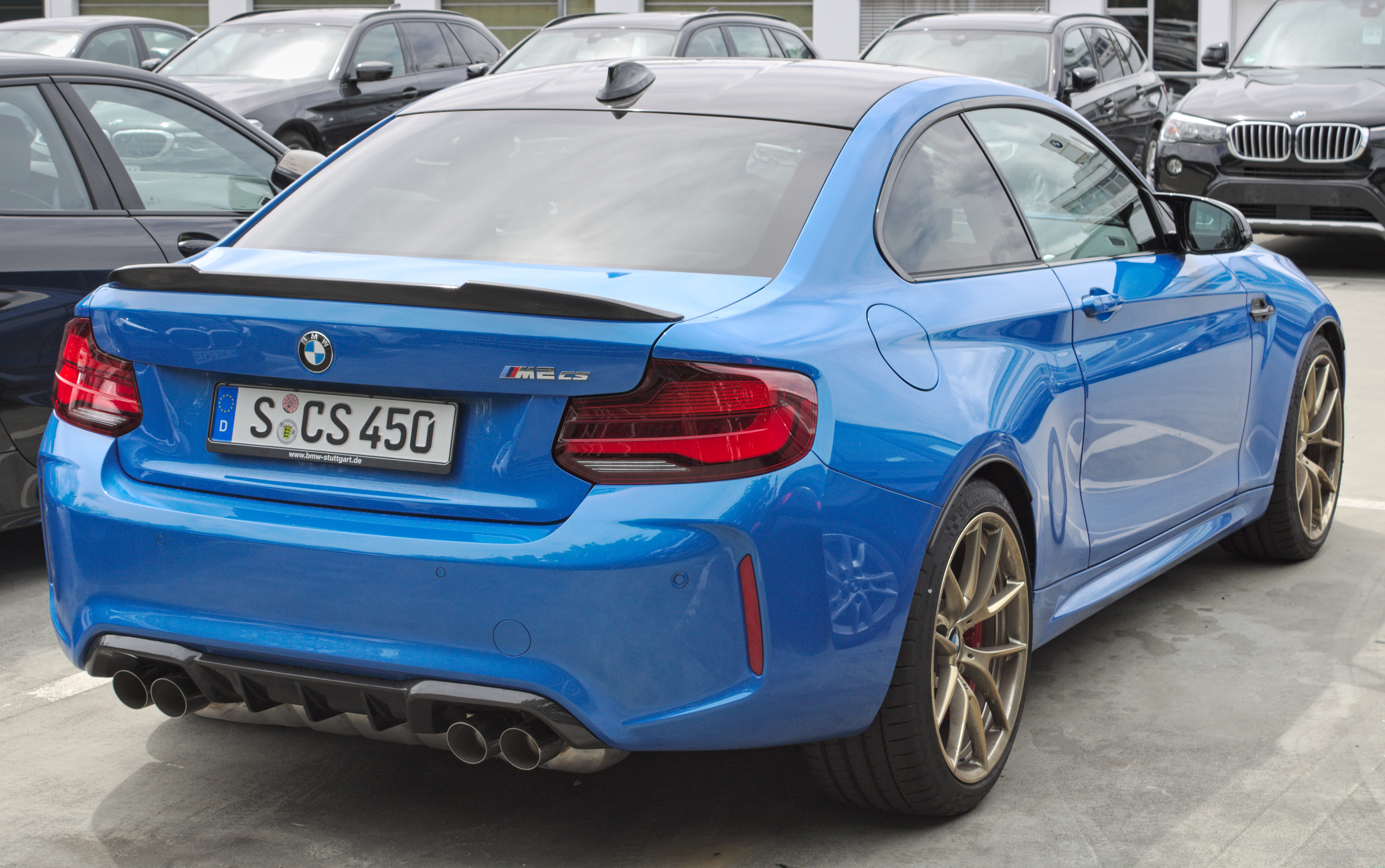
Rear view

The BMW M2 CS, a more track-focused version of the BMW M2 Competition, and was unveiled online in November 2019 prior to its introduction at the LA Auto Show. Production began in March 2020, with 2,200 units planned for North America and Eurasia.

The M2 CS uses the same engine as the M2 Competition but with the F82 M4 Competition package ECU map, resulting in 331 kW (444 hp) and 550 N⋅m (406 lb⋅ft) of torque (the same torque as other S55 engined M models) . The 0–100 km/h (62 mph) acceleration time is 4.2 seconds for 6-speed manual transmission models, and 4.0 seconds for models equipped with the 7-speed dual-clutch transmission.

The M Performance Brakes option rotors and calipers from the M2 Competition are carried over as standard, but carbon-ceramic brakes are available as an option. An adaptive M suspension is standard along with an electronic locking differential. The wheel hubs and control arms are made from forged aluminium, with a carbon-fibre transmission tunnel as an additional weight-saving measure. The hood, roof and various aerodynamic parts are made of a carbon-fibre composite. The active exhaust system is new as well, and unique wheel designs in high-gloss jet black or matte gold finishes differentiate it from other M2 models; Michelin Cup 2 tires are also available.

Inside, the centre console is also carbon-fibre, with Alcantara trim and an embroidered red "CS" badge; the seats are leather and Alcantara with red contrast stitching and are complemented by contrast-stitched Alcantara on the steering wheel. The central armrest and rear air vents, which are standard on the M2 and M2 Competition, have been removed for weight reduction.

== Second generation (G87; 2023) ==
Second generation
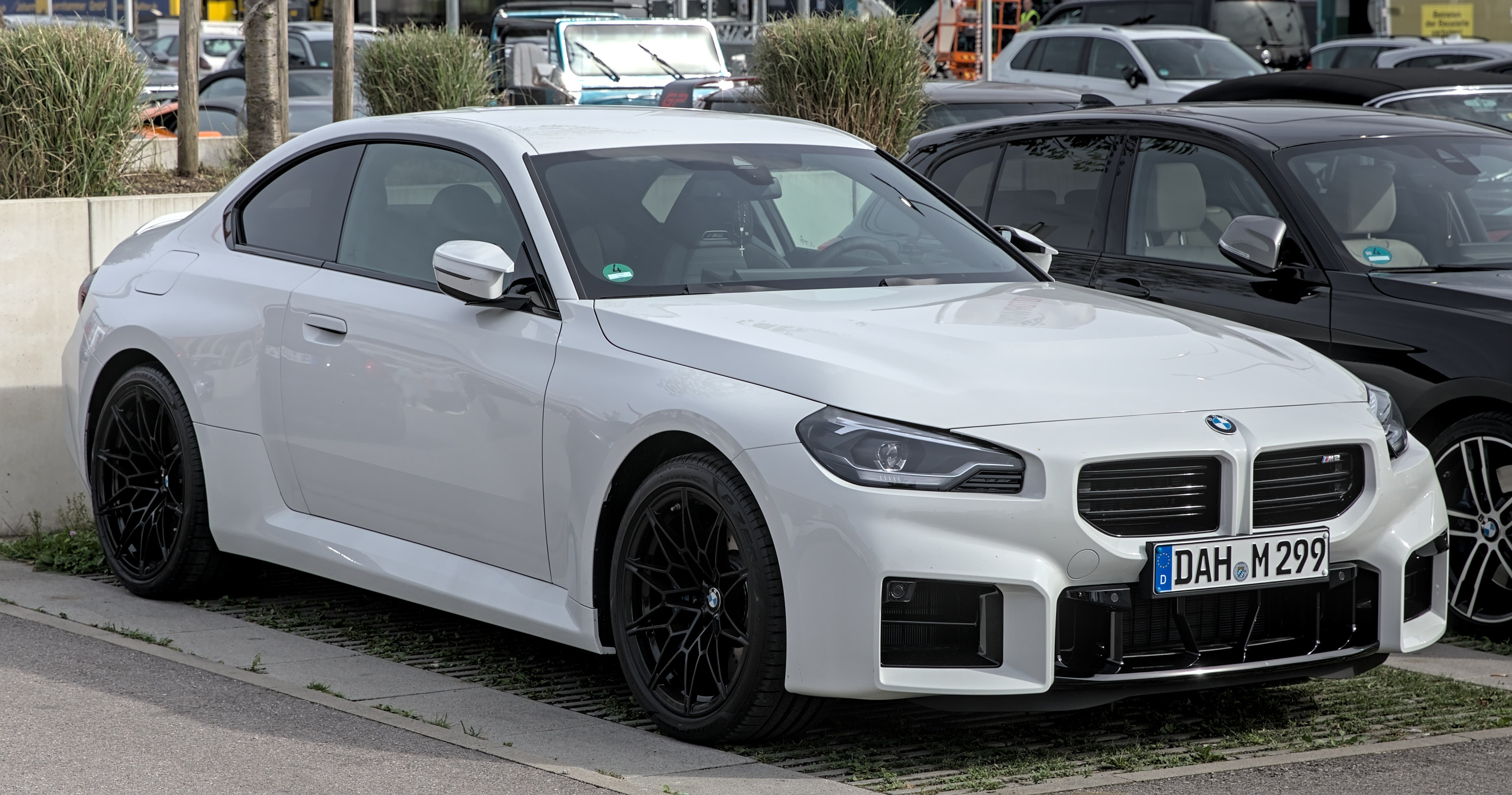

Overview
- Model code: G87
- Production: 2023–present
- Model years: 2023–present
- Assembly: Mexico: San Luis Potosí (BMW Group Planta San Luis Potosí)
- Designer: José Casas

Body and chassis
- Platform: BMW CLAR platform
- Related: BMW 2 Series (G42)

Powertrain
- Engine: 3.0 L S58B30T0 twin-turbo I6
- Transmission: 6-speed ZF GS6-L55TZ manual; 8-speed ZF 8HP automatic transmission

Dimensions
- Wheelbase: 2,747 mm (108.1 in)
- Length: 4,580 mm (180 in)
- Width: 1,887 mm (74.3 in)
- Height: 1,403 mm (55.2 in)
- Curb weight: 1,699 kg (3,745 lb) (manual); 1,730 kg (3,813 lb) (automatic)

=== BMW M2 Coupé ===
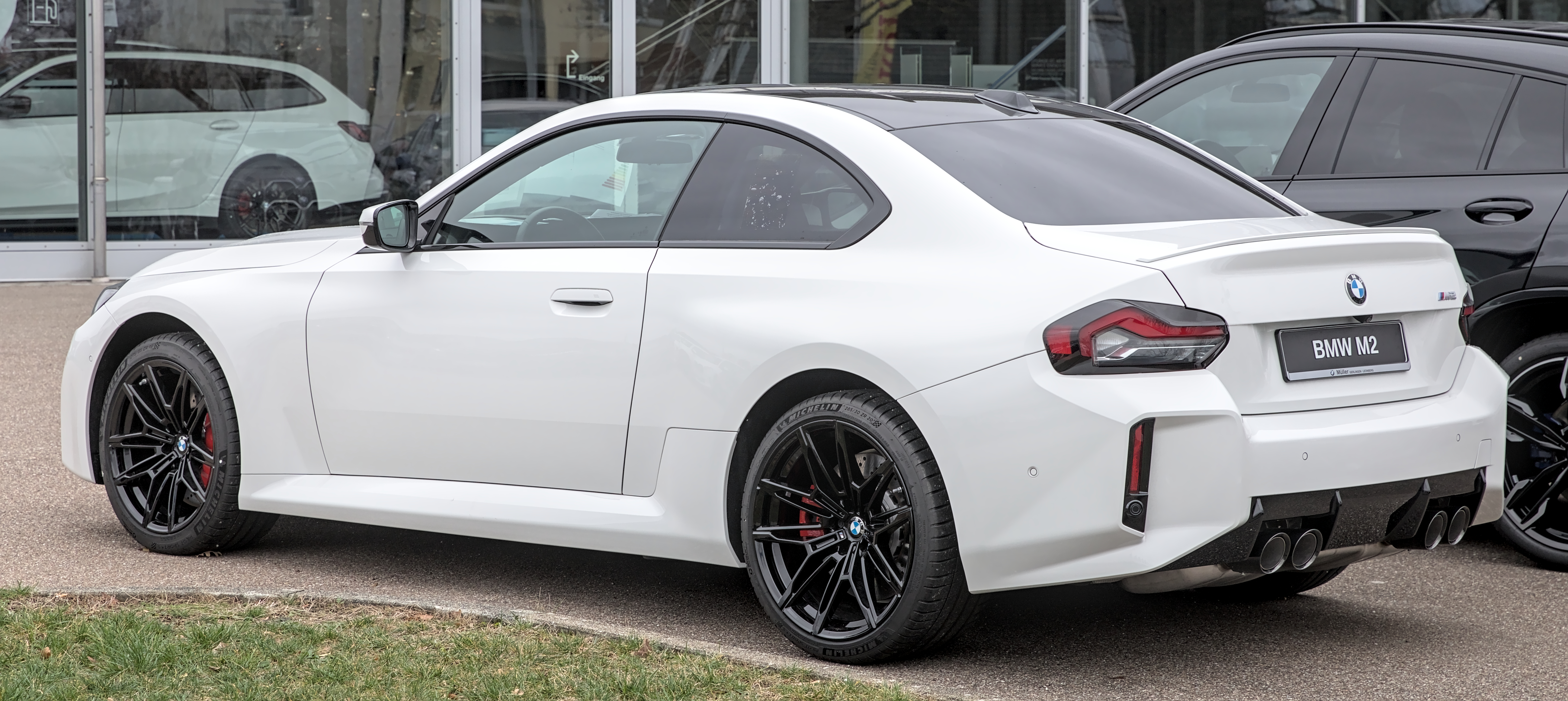
Rear view

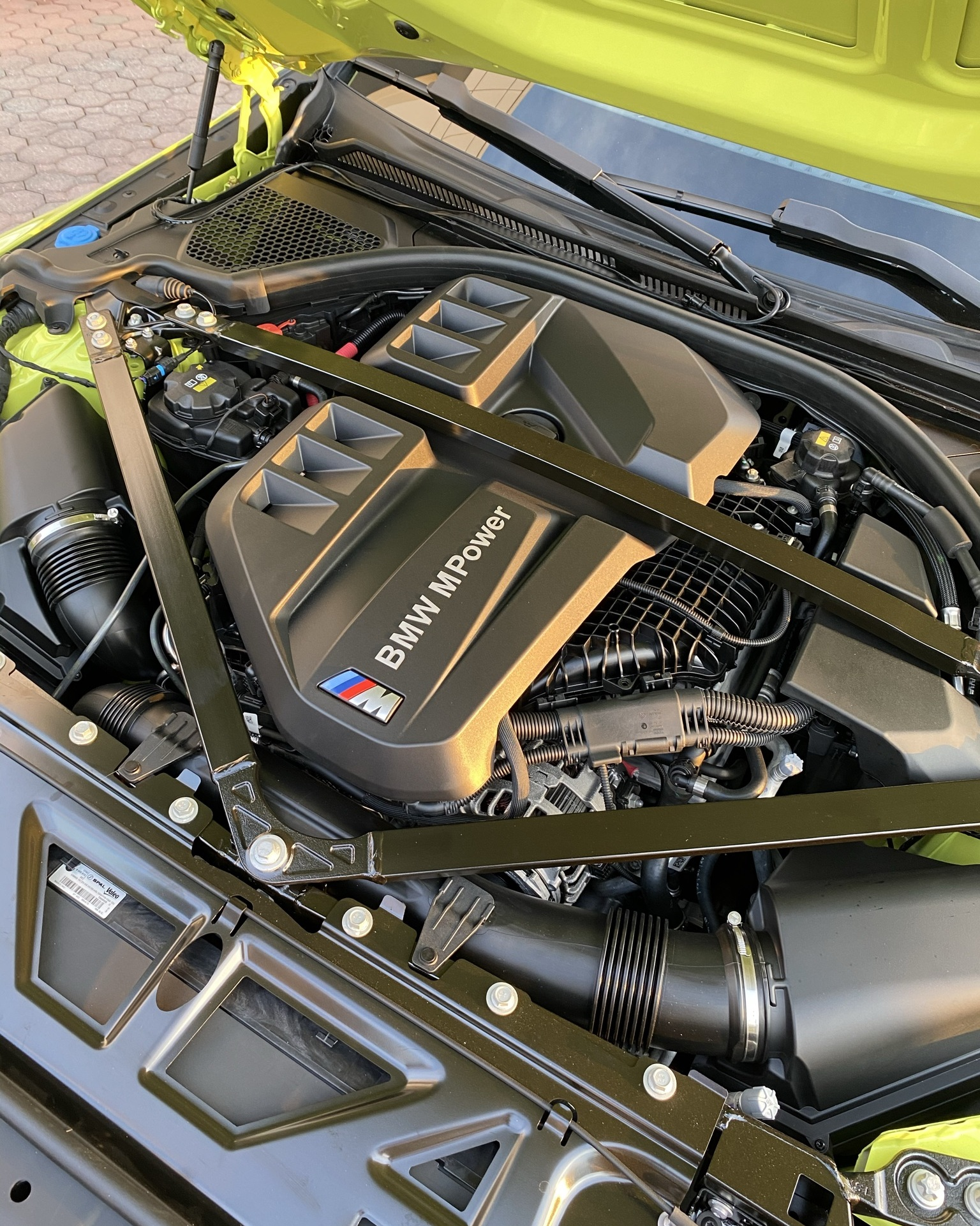
BMW S58 turbocharged inline-six engine

The second-generation M2 (G87) was shown to the public ahead of its debut at Motorclassica in Melbourne, Australia, in October 2022. The second-generation M2 wheelbase is 2.1 in (53 mm) longer and overall length is 4.1 in (100 mm) longer and is 1.3 in (33 mm) wider than the first-generation M2.

The M2 is powered by the twin-turbo 3.0-litre BMW S58 straight-six engine, it was rated at launch with 460 PS (454 hp; 338 kW) at 6,250 rpm and 550 N⋅m (56.1 kg⋅m; 406 lb⋅ft) between 2,600 and 5,950 rpm.

It is available with a 6-speed manual or with an 8-speed automatic transmission. 0–100 km/h (0–62 mph) acceleration times are 4.3 seconds for manual transmission models and 4.1 seconds for automatic transmission models, and for 2025 model acceleration times are 4.2 seconds for manual transmission models and 4.0 seconds for automatic transmission models. Top speed is limited to 250 km/h (155 mph) but can be extended to 285 km/h (177 mph) with the optional M Driver's package.

In some markets, the M2 offered an optional carbon package. The package included M carbon bucket seats that are both power operated and heated as well as a carbon fibre roof and carbon fibre interior trim. A power sunroof will be standard in the US but optional in Europe. Other options include a Shadowline package, a lighting package which offers full-LED adaptive headlights and automatic high beams and driver assistant packages.

The car launched in April 2023.

Upon launch, the M2 was offered in five colors including Zandvoort Blue which is exclusive to the G87 M2.

=== Mid-cycle refresh ===
The BMW M2 received a minor refresh for the 2025 model year. The M2 received a 20 PS (20 hp; 15 kW) increase to 480 PS (473 hp; 353 kW) and an increase in torque of 49 N⋅m (5.00 kg⋅m; 36.1 lb⋅ft) to 599 N⋅m (61.1 kg⋅m; 442 lb⋅ft), the same as the G82 M4, but only vehicles equipped with the 8-speed automatic; torque remains at 550 N⋅m (56.1 kg⋅m; 406 lb⋅ft) with the 6-speed manual transmission. BMW has stated the manual transmission 2025 M2 will be 0.1 seconds quicker zero-to-97 km/h (60 mph) time, bringing it to a claimed 4.1 seconds. BMW says the added torque and quick shifting of the 8-speed automatic transmission can get the M2 to 97 km/h (60 mph) in 3.9 seconds.

The refreshed M2 has fourteen different paint hues available including four "BMW Individual" paint colours, updated wheels and exhaust tips. Minor interior updates include a flat-bottomed leather-wrapped steering wheel with a red centre stripe and other minor differences. The M Sport seats have a new black with red highlight option and carbon fibre bucket seats are now available as a standalone option or part of the Carbon Package.

=== BMW M2 CS ===
For the 2026 model year, BMW offers an M2 CS. While not a limited production model, as of 2025, fewer than 2,000 units were expected to be built in a single model year. The M2 CS comes equipped with a twin-turbocharged 3.0-litre inline 6-cylinder engine making 530 PS (523 hp; 390 kW) and 649 N⋅m (66.2 kg⋅m; 479 lb⋅ft) and is only offered with an 8-speed automatic transmission. The CS is nearly 100 lb (45 kg) lighter than the standard M2 because the roof, trunk lid, mirror caps, and rear diffuser are made of carbon fibre. The standard forged-aluminum wheels also contribute to weight reduction. In addition, carbon-ceramic brakes are optional. The car features a ducktail rear spoiler unique to the M2 CS. The CS sits 0.2 in (5.1 mm) lower thanks to new springs. The adaptive dampers are also unique to the CS with their own programming. Stability control and M Dynamic mode are revised as well.

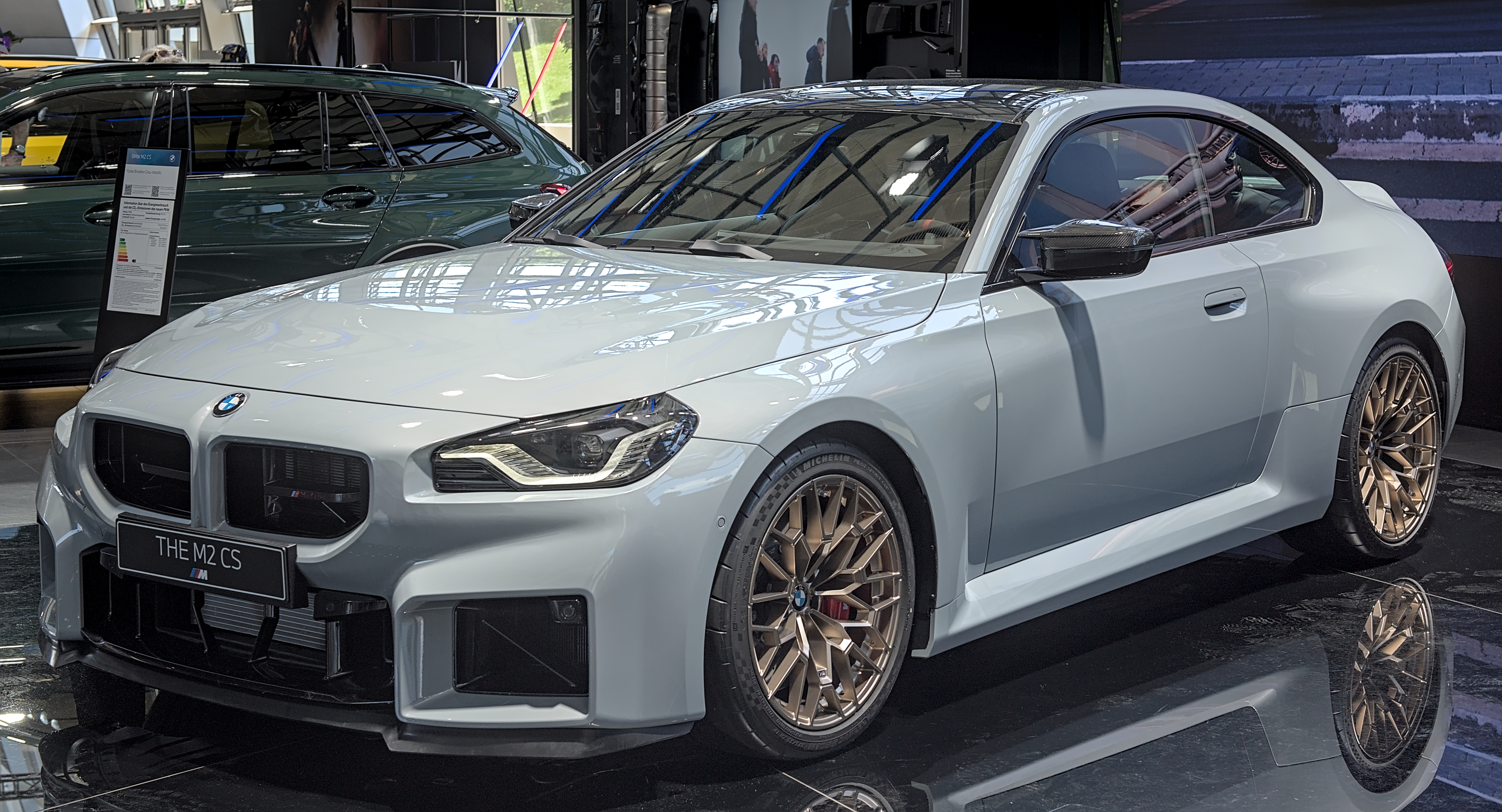
Front

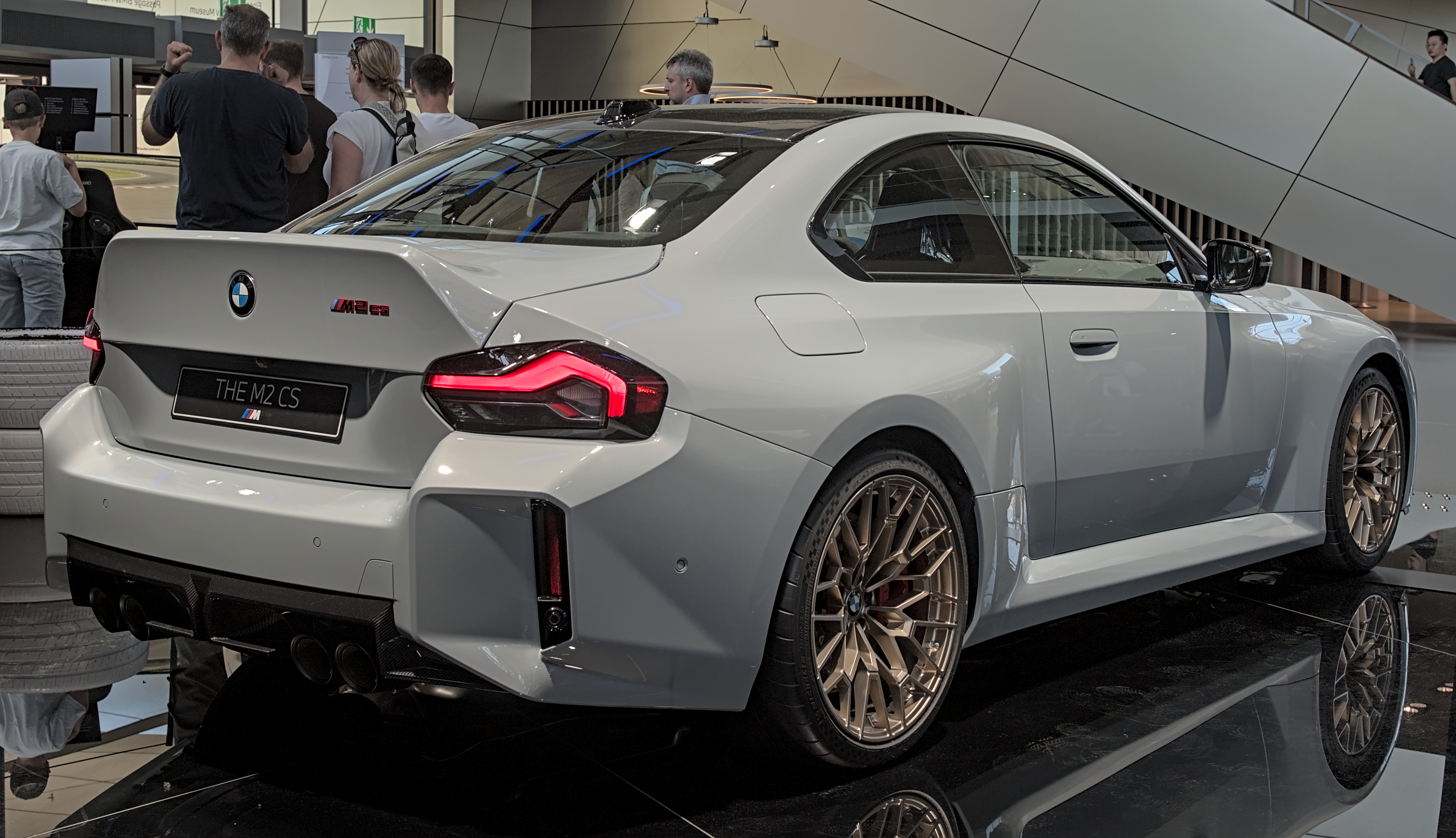
Rear

=== BMW M2 Turbo Design Edition ===
For 2026, BMW will build a limited production M2 Turbo Design Edition. Available only in Alpine white with hand-painted Motorsport stripes and a black hood graphic with “turbo” in mirror writing, It is a tribute to the BMW 2002 turbo, the first European production vehicle powered by a turbocharged engine. The M2 Turbo Design Edition is only available with a 6-speed manual transmission.

=== BMW M2 CS Edition Edge ===
For 2027, BMW will build 40 M2 CS Edition Edge vehicles strictly for the Japanese domestic market. The Edition Edge vehicles receive additional carbon fiber accessories, an M Performance quad-tipped center-exit exhaust, and carbon ceramic brakes. 20 will be finished in Brooklyn Grey and the remaining units in Sapphire Black with all units being right-hand-drive.

== Awards and accolades ==
=== First generation ===
- 2017: The BMW M2 is included in Car and Driver's 10Best
- 2019: The BMW M2 Competition is included in Car and Driver's 10Best
- 2020: The BMW M2 CS is named Evo Magazine Car of the Year

Motor Trend's Jonny Lieberman called the 2020 M2 CS the best BMW M car in 12 years.

=== Second generation ===
- 2023: The BMW M2 is named Auto Express Performance Car of the Year
- 2024: The BMW M2 is named Motor Trend's Performance Vehicle of the Year
- 2026: The BMW M2 is included in Car and Driver's 10Best

== Motorsport ==
=== BMW M2 CS Racing ===
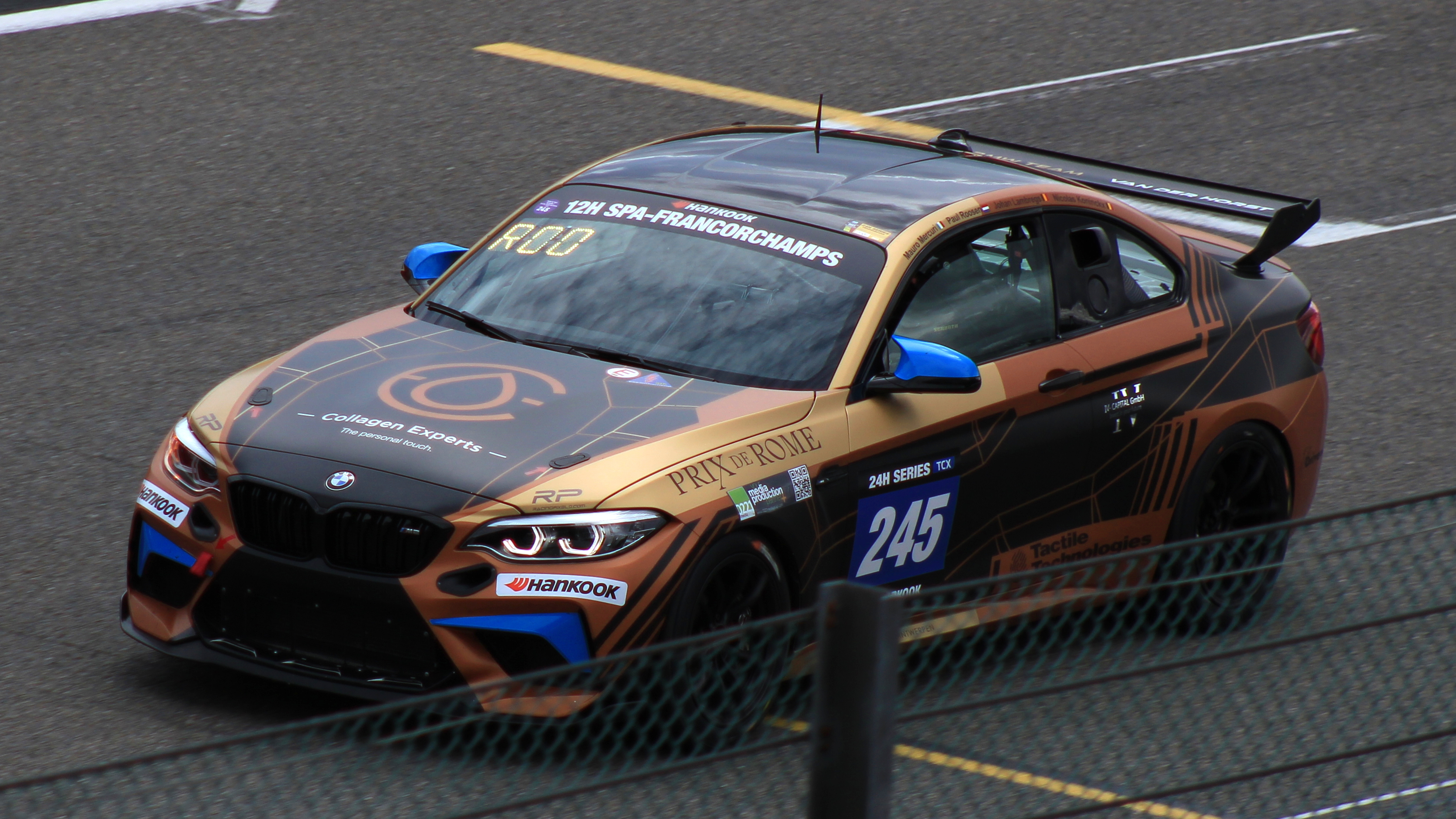
Mauro Mercuri driving the M2 CS Racing during the 2023 12 Hours of Spa-Francorchamps

The BMW M2 CS Racing is a racing variant of the road-going F87 M2 CS, developed by BMW M Motorsport, to get prospective racing drivers better accustomed to faster cars. The racecar has many developments that have been inspired by and developed further from its predecessors, the BMW M235i Racing, and the BMW M240i Racing, along with its "bigger brother" racecar, the BMW M4 GT4. The racecar gets power from a race-prepped 3-liter twin-turbo inline-6 that can generate anywhere from 280 hp (205 kW) to 365 hp (268 kW) depending on the configuration of the power stick, which is in turn controlled by the need to have a balance of performance or from regulations of a Permit B classification. The BMW M2 CS Racing also features a full FIA-approved roll cage, along with many motorsport-specific components, such as the rear wing, including ABS systems specifically tailored to the car by BMW M Motorsport. A stronger performance package was made to allow the racecar to have up to 450 hp (336 kW), just 6 hp more than the street-legal version. Deliveries of the BMW M2 CS Racing are expected to start in mid-2020.

=== BMW M2 Racing ===
The BMW M2 Racing at Indianapolis Motor Speedway.

The BMW M2 Racing is a racing variant of the road-going G87 M2, developed by BMW M Motorsport and is the successor to the BMW M2 CS Racing for entry-level racing. Unlike the G87 M2, it utilizes the turbocharged, inline-four engine, B48, producing 313 hp (233 kW) and 310 lb⋅ft (420 N⋅m), with a top speed of "greater than" 167 mph (269 km/h). Other upgrades includes, non-adjustable KW shock absorbers, a seven-speed ZF transmission, adjustable anti-roll bars in front and rear, and a race exhaust system. It will cost €98,000 ($111,178 USD) and will compete in various championships such as the Nürburgring 24, NLS, TC America Series, IMSA VP Racing SportsCar Challenge and the Michelin 24H Series. It made its competition debut at the 2025 24 Hours of Nürburgring, with BMW factory drivers Jens Klingmann, Charles Weerts, Ugo de Wilde and journalist Michael Bräutigam. The team won the SP 3T class, nine laps ahead of the second place finisher.

== Concept cars ==
=== 2002 Hommage Concept ===
The BMW 2002 Hommage Concept was introduced in May 2016 at the Concorso d'Eleganza Villa d'Este and pays tribute to the BMW 2002 Turbo. The car's underpinnings are based on a BMW M2.

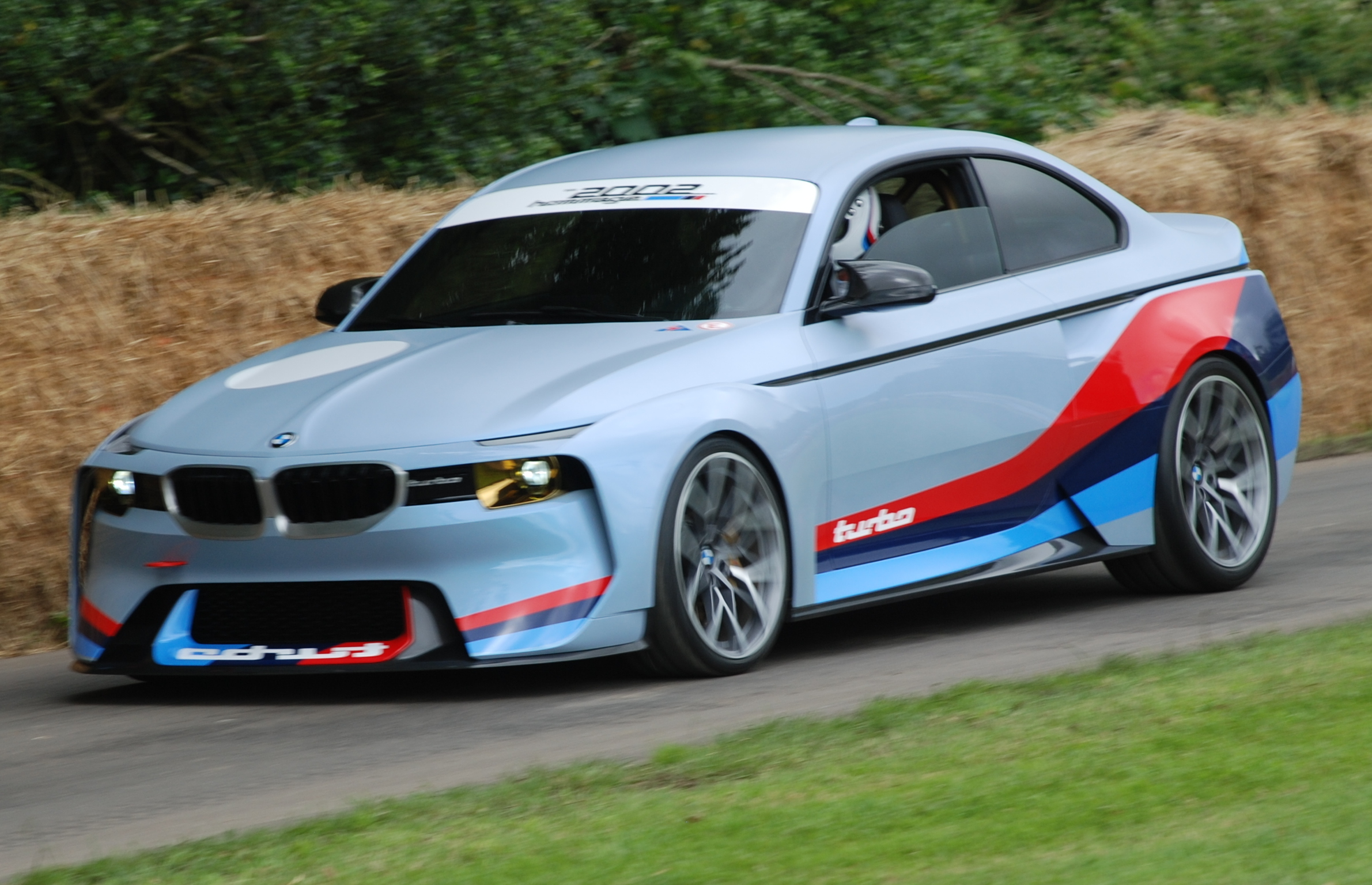

=== 2002 Hommage Turbomeister Concept ===
The BMW 2002 Hommage Turbomeister Concept was introduced in August 2016 at Pebble Beach Concours d'Elegance.

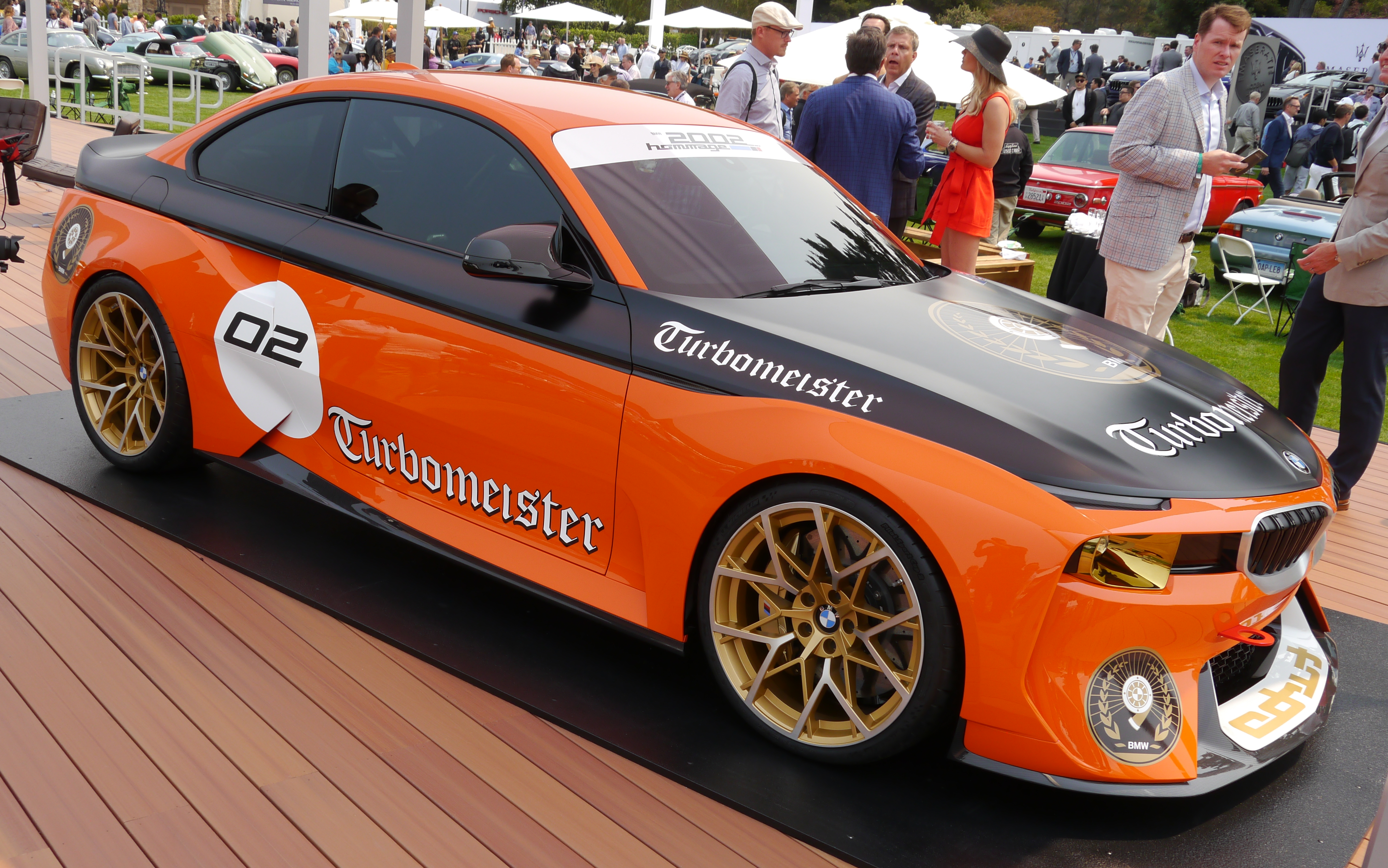
