= BMW 2 Series =

Range of subcompact executive cars manufactured by BMW

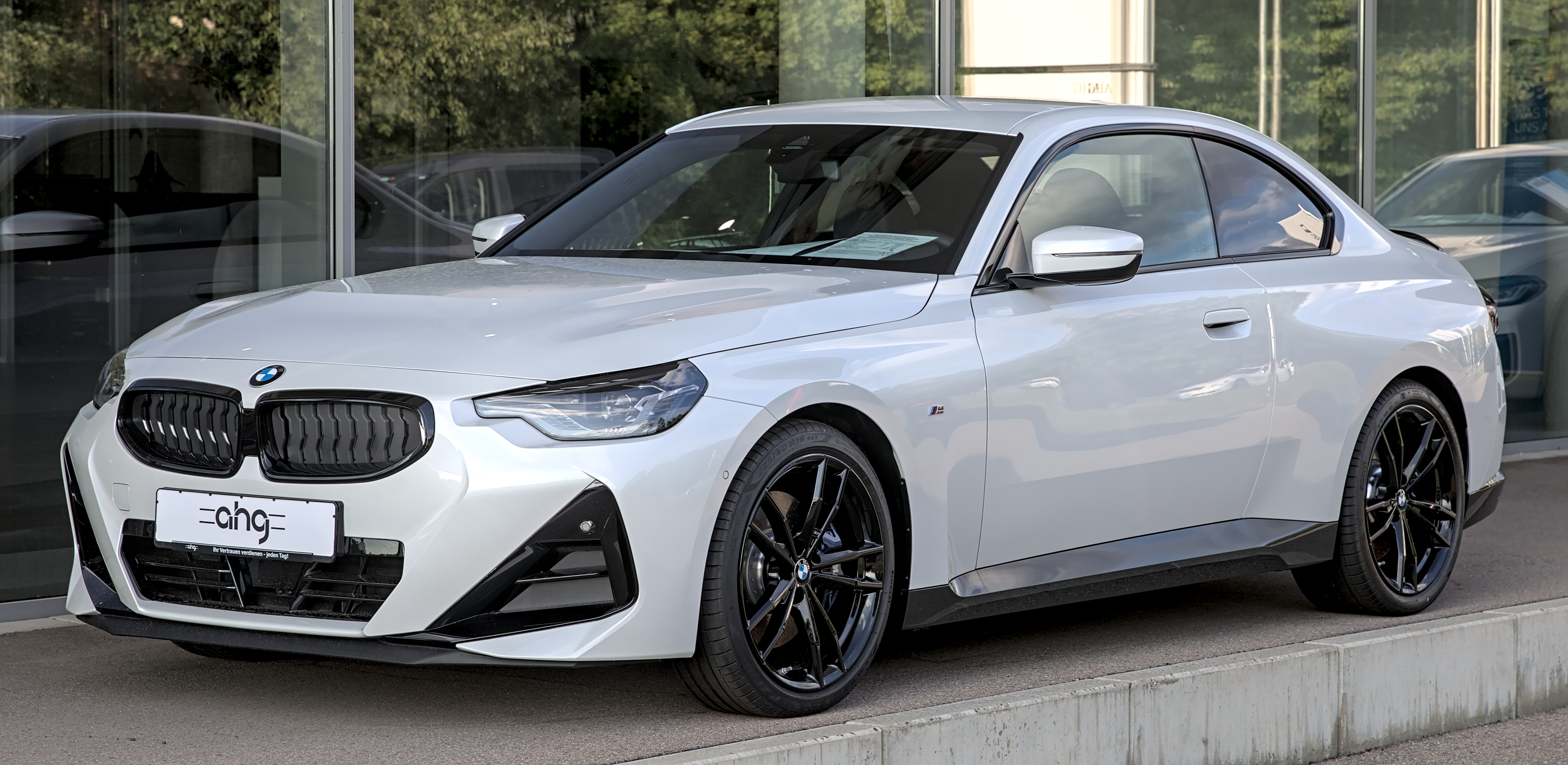
- BMW 2 Series G42 Coupe (Germany)

Overview
- Manufacturer: BMW
- Production: 2014–present

Body and chassis
- Class: Subcompact executive car (C) (segment is for Gran Coupe); Sport compact Sports car (M240i and M2)
- Related: BMW 1 Series

Chronology
- Predecessor: BMW 1 Series (E82/E88) (coupé/convertible)

The BMW 2 Series is a range of subcompact executive cars (C-segment) manufactured by BMW since the year 2014. The 2 Series was created when BMW spun-off the 2-door models (coupé and convertible) of the BMW 1 Series into a separate series.

The 2 Series was first launched as a 2-door coupé and convertible, both based on a rear-wheel drive platform. A year later, the Active Tourer 5-seat compact MPV body style was added, based on the unrelated front-wheel drive platform shared with the Mini Countryman. This was followed by a 7-seat version called the Gran Tourer. In 2019, the Gran Coupé fastback sedan joined the 2 Series family as a front-wheel drive vehicle based on the 1 Series hatchback and has been marketed as a 4-door coupe. In 2021, BMW released the second-generation 2-door coupé, rear-wheel drive 2 Series in July 2021.

The BMW M2 is the high-performance version of the 2 Series 2-door coupé. The first generation of the M2, the F87 coupé, was introduced in 2016 and featured the BMW N55 turbocharged inline-six engine.

== Coupé/convertible ==
=== First generation (F22/F23; 2014) ===
The first-generation 2 Series was a rear-wheel-drive 2-door coupé (F22 model code), and 2-door convertible (F23 model code). This generation started production in November 2013 as the successor to the E82 1 Series coupé and E88 1 Series convertible. It was produced in Leipzig alongside the F20 1 Series hatchback range and using the same platform. There were many different models including the 220, 228, 230, and the range topping version of the coupe, the M235i, which used the BMW N55 engine. This was later replaced by the M240 which used the BMW B58 engine.

The top performance car was F87 M2 model. The M2 was powered by two different turbocharged inline-six engines, the BMW N55 in the original version, and later the BMW S55 in the Competition and CS models.

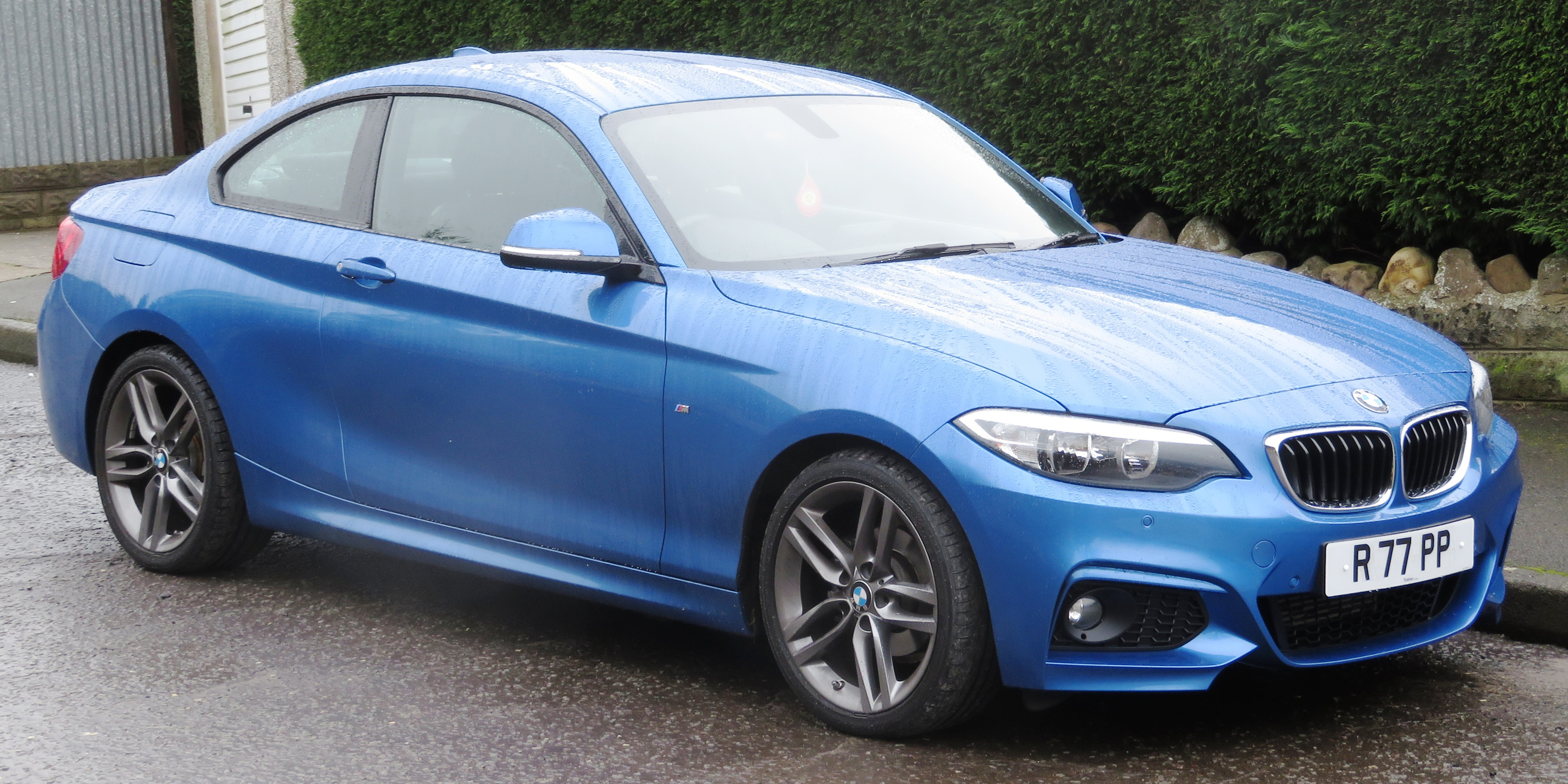
BMW 2 Series coupé (F22)

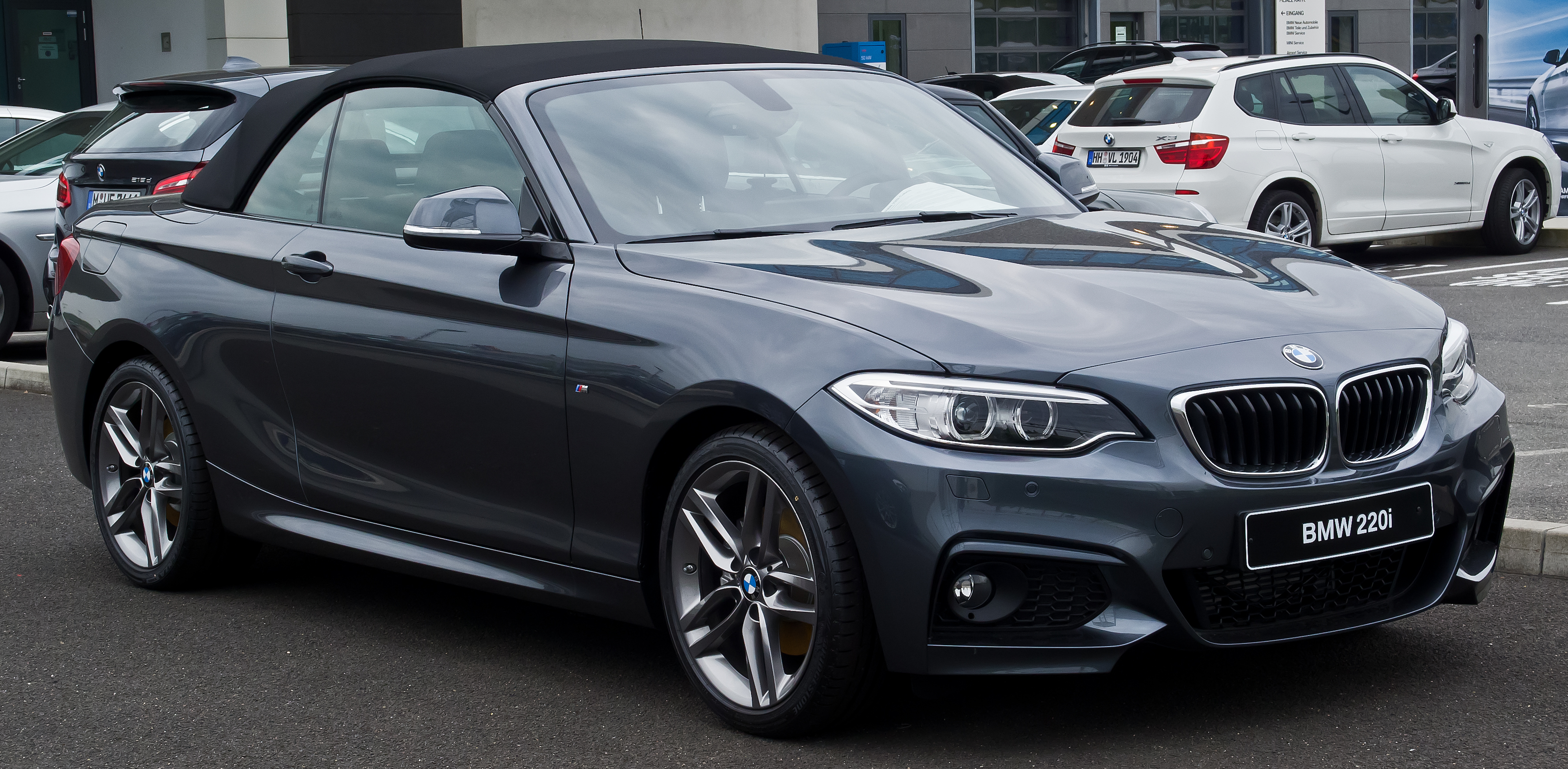
BMW 2 Series convertible (F23)

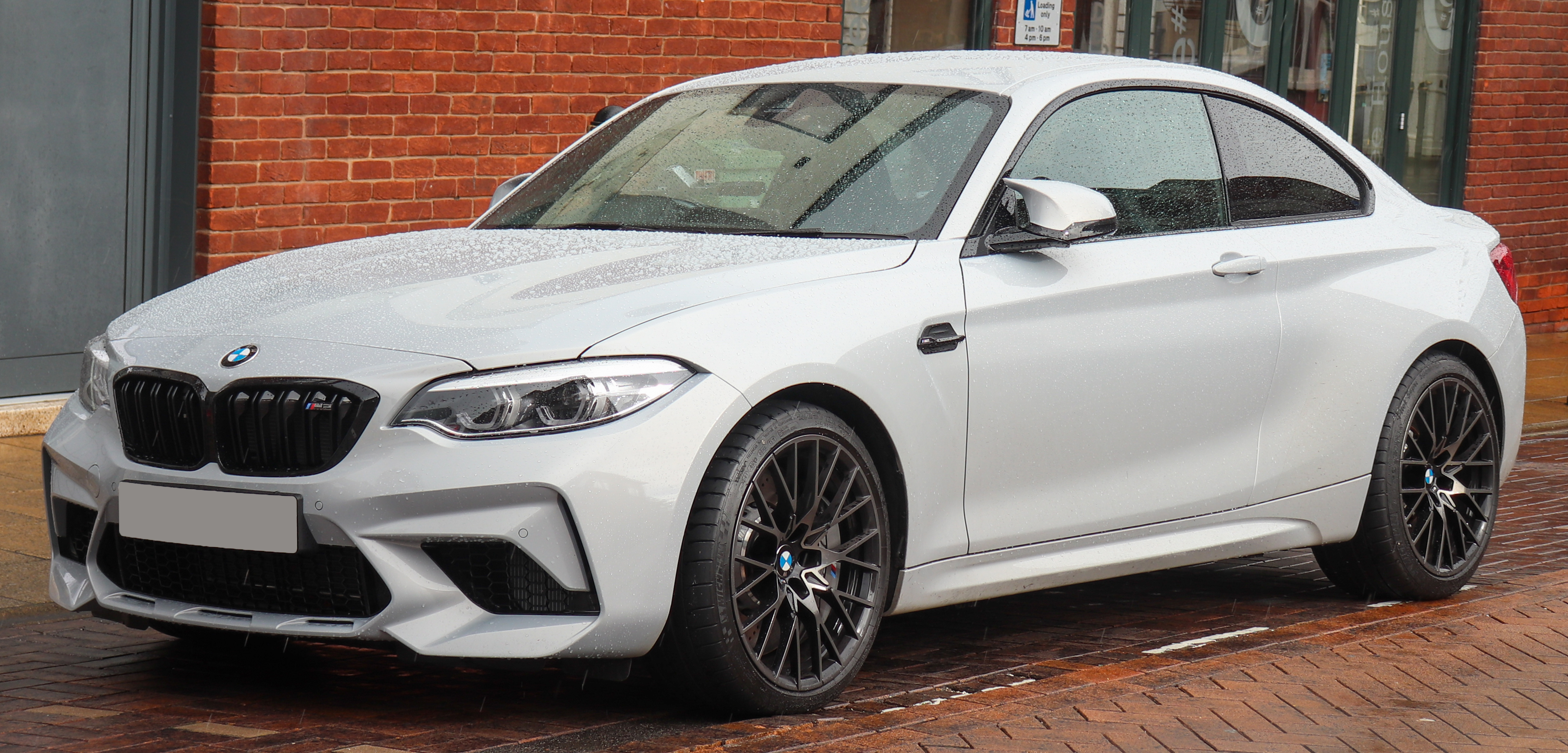
BMW M2 Competition (F87)

=== Second generation (G42; 2021) ===
The second-generation 2 Series coupé was revealed in July 2021 as the successor to the F22 2 Series coupé and convertible. Remaining a rear-wheel-drive-based model, the G42 is built on the CLAR platform with a roughly 50-50 weight distribution and shares many mechanical components and engine options with the G20 3 Series and G22 4 Series. The second-generation 2 Series is not available with a manual transmission or as a convertible. The launch models consist of the mild hybrid diesel engine 220d, the petrol engine 220i and 230i and the top M240i xDrive. The G42 2 Series is exclusively produced in BMW's San Luis Potosí plant in Mexico, and the first BMW vehicle designed by BMW of Mexico. Production of the G42 2 Series commenced on 2 September 2021.

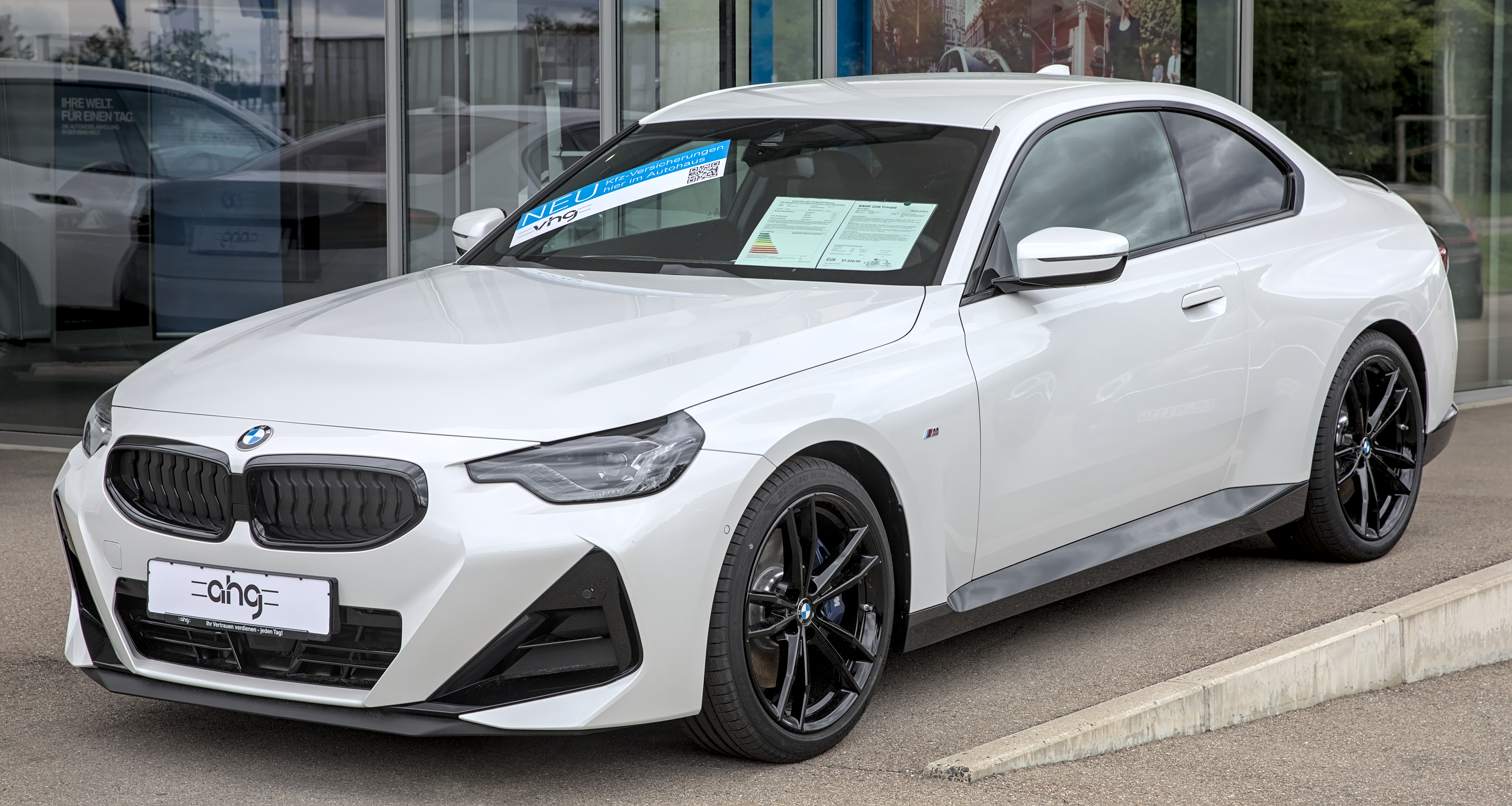
BMW 2 Series coupe (G42)

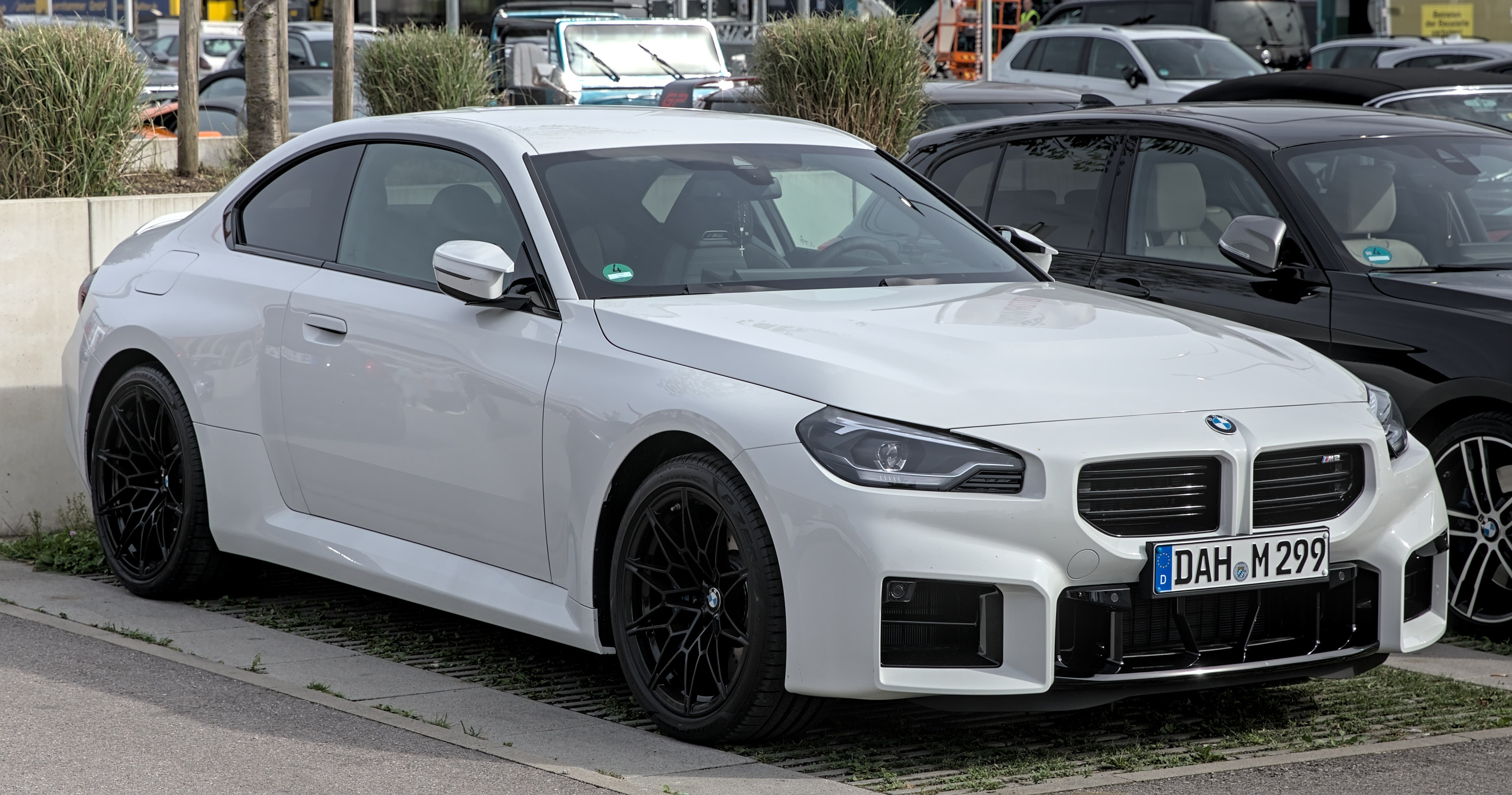
BMW M2 (G87)

== Active Tourer/Gran Tourer ==
=== First generation (F45/F46; 2014) ===
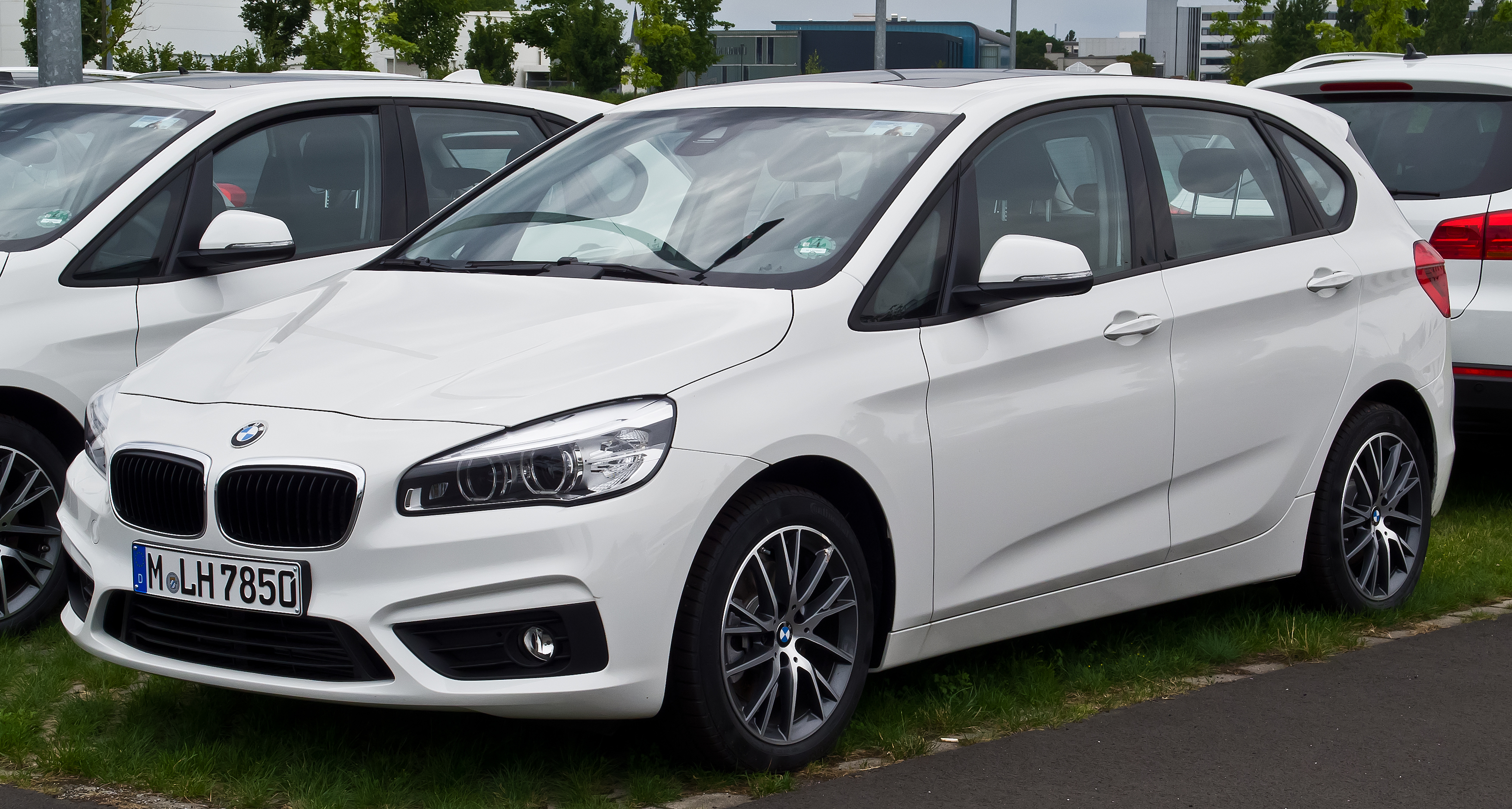
BMW 2 Series Active Tourer (F45)

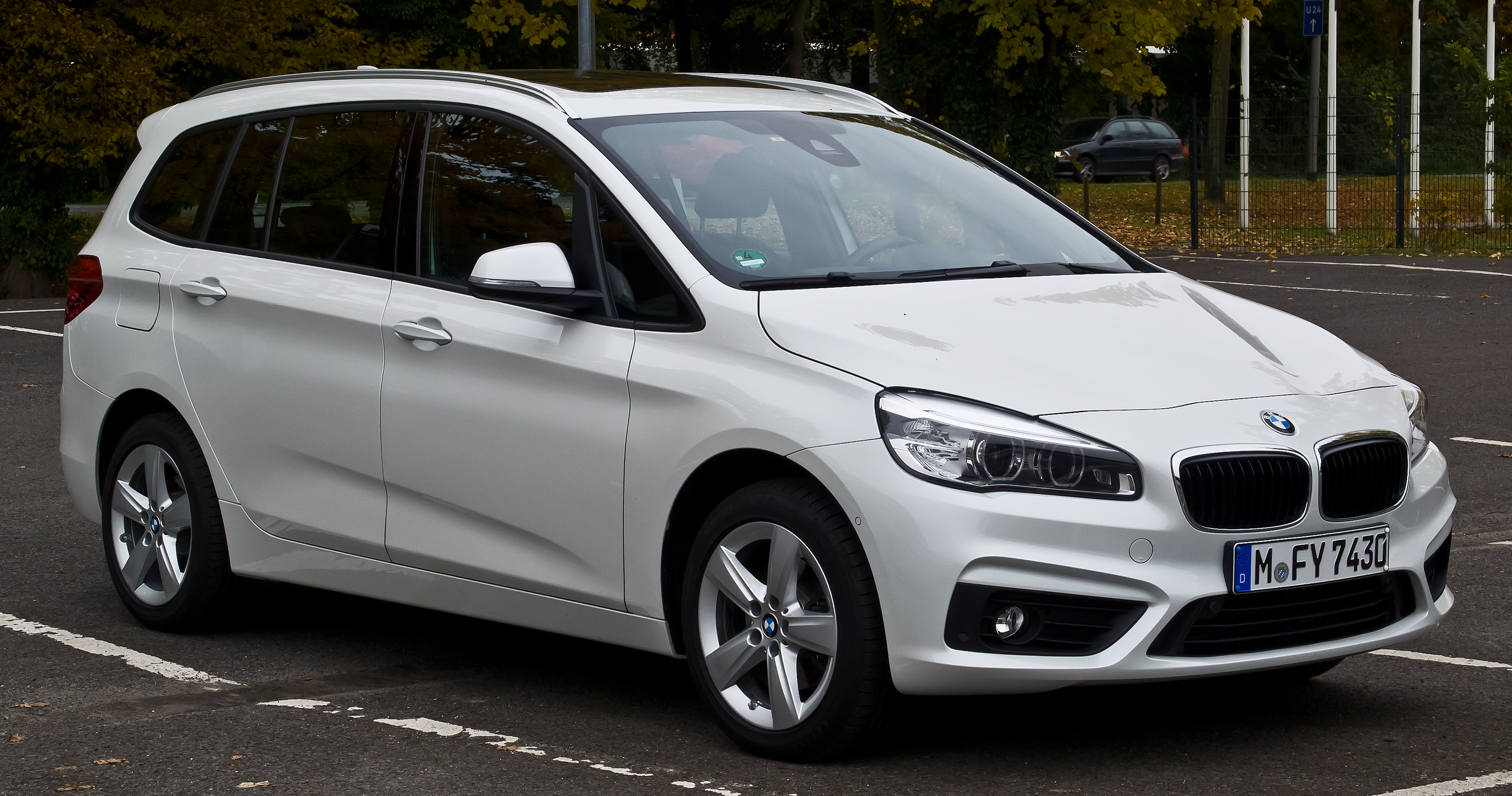
BMW 2 Series Gran Tourer (F46)

The BMW 2 Series Active Tourer is a five-door, two-row compact MPV produced since 2014. The vehicle is built on the front-wheel drive-based UKL2 platform with an optional all-wheel drive (xDrive). It is the first BMW-branded model to not use the rear-wheel drive configuration. A longer version with three-row seating called the BMW 2 Series Gran Tourer was released shortly after in 2015.

=== Second generation (U06; 2021) ===
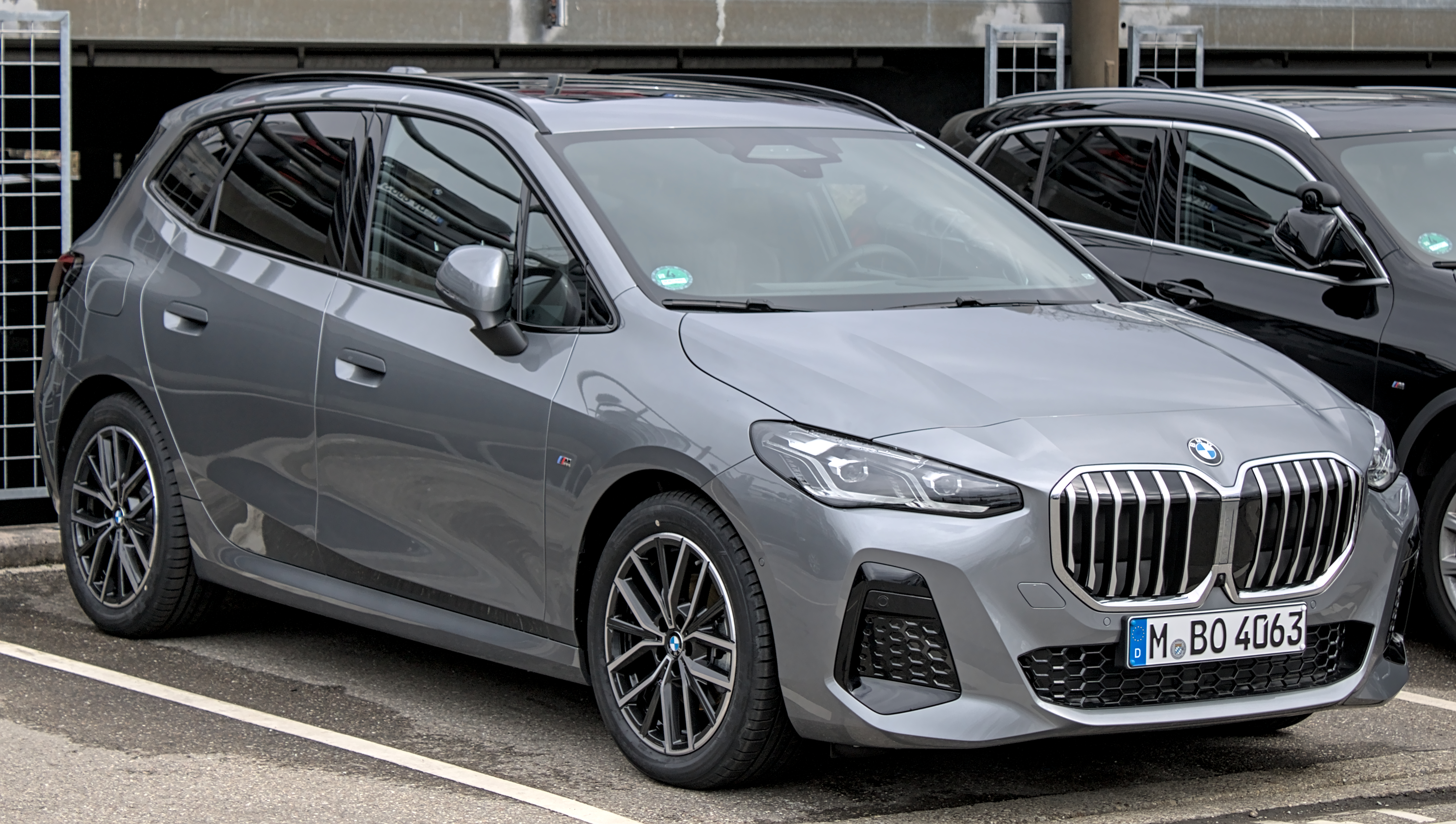
BMW 2 Series Active Tourer (U06)

The second-generation BMW 2 Series Active Tourer was unveiled in October 2021. Available with a choice of petrol and diesel engines, a range of PHEV powertrains was available since 2022.

== Gran Coupé ==
=== First generation (F44; 2019) ===
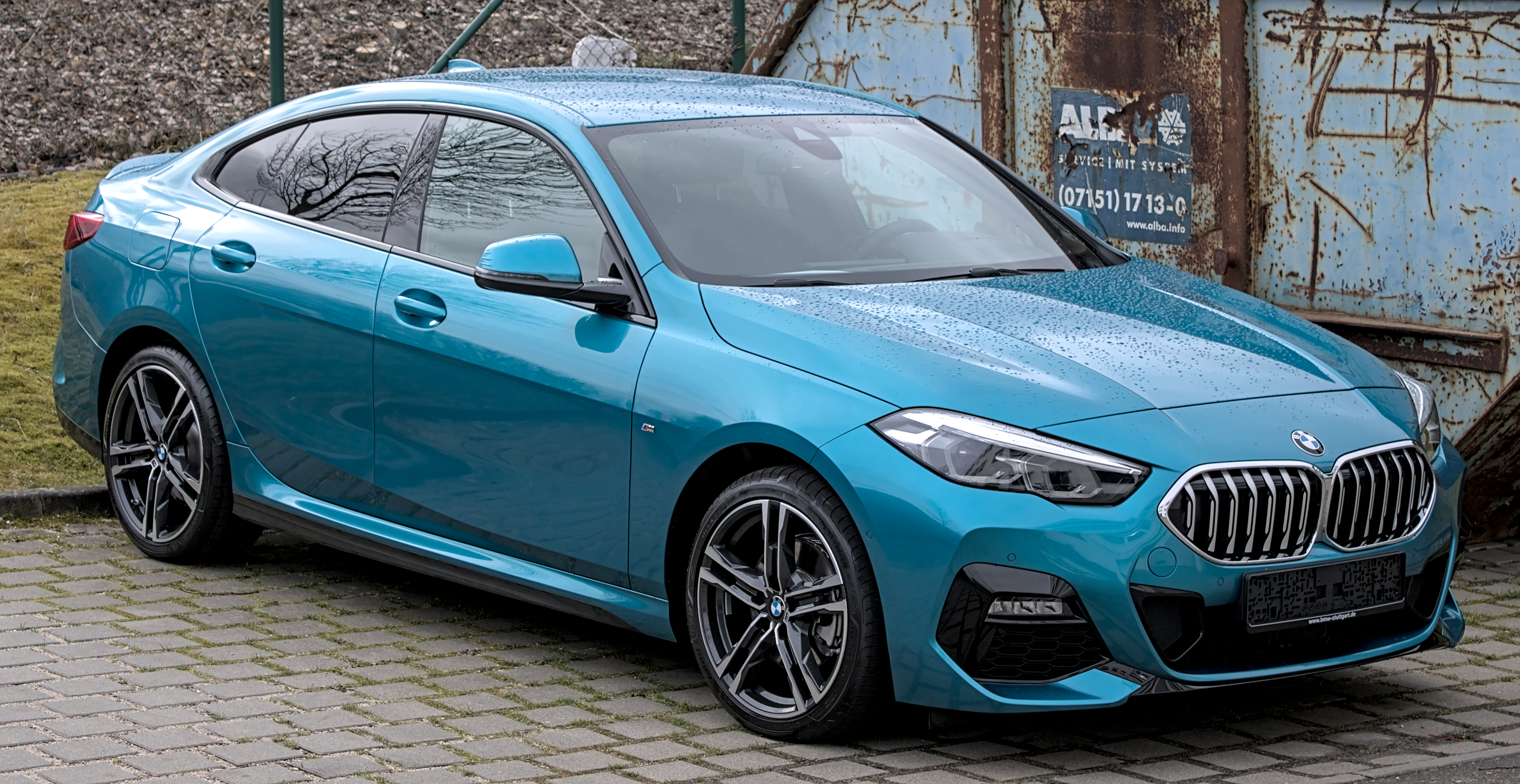
BMW 2 Series Gran Coupé (F44)

BMW revealed a four-door sedan variant under the 2 Series range in October 2019 as the BMW 2 Series Gran Coupé. Like the Active Tourer (F45) and Gran Tourer (F46) it is built on the front-wheel drive UKL2 platform. In markets where the vehicle is being sold, it is the smallest four-door sedan offered by BMW, except in China and Mexico where the smaller F52 1 Series sedan is offered.

=== Second generation (F74; 2025) ===
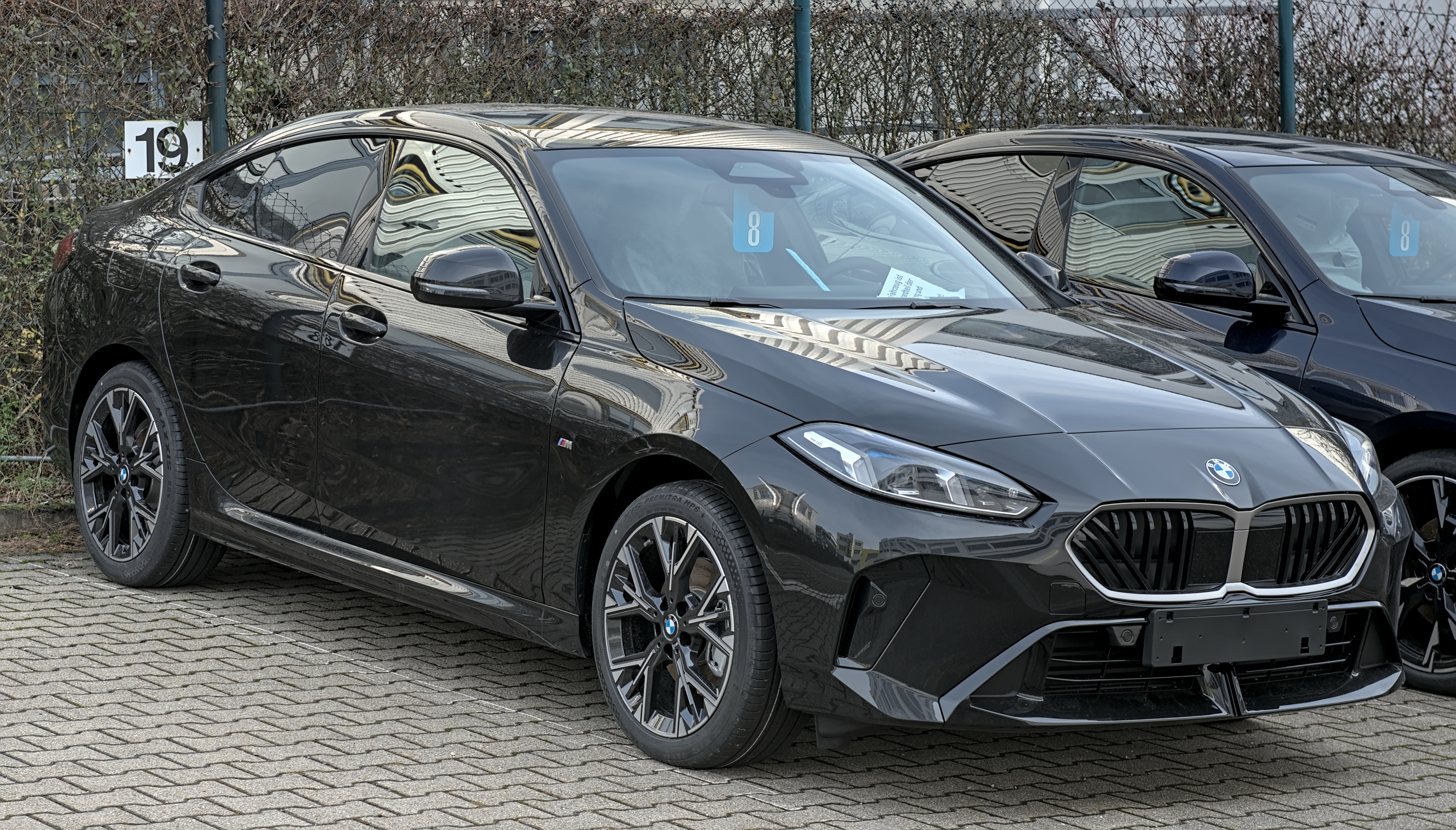
BMW 2 Series Gran Coupé (F74)

The second-generation BMW 2 Series Gran Coupé was officially unveiled on 15 October 2024. It retains the front-wheel drive-based UKL2 architecture and shares components with the F70 1 Series. The interior is completely redesigned and features a curved display powered by the latest BMW Operating System 9. The 2 Series comes standard with the 1.5 L three-cylinder mild hybrid engine based on the B38 platform. Production at the BMW Leipzig Plant commenced in November 2024 with a schedule market launch in March 2025.

== Motorsport ==
=== BMW M235i Racing ===
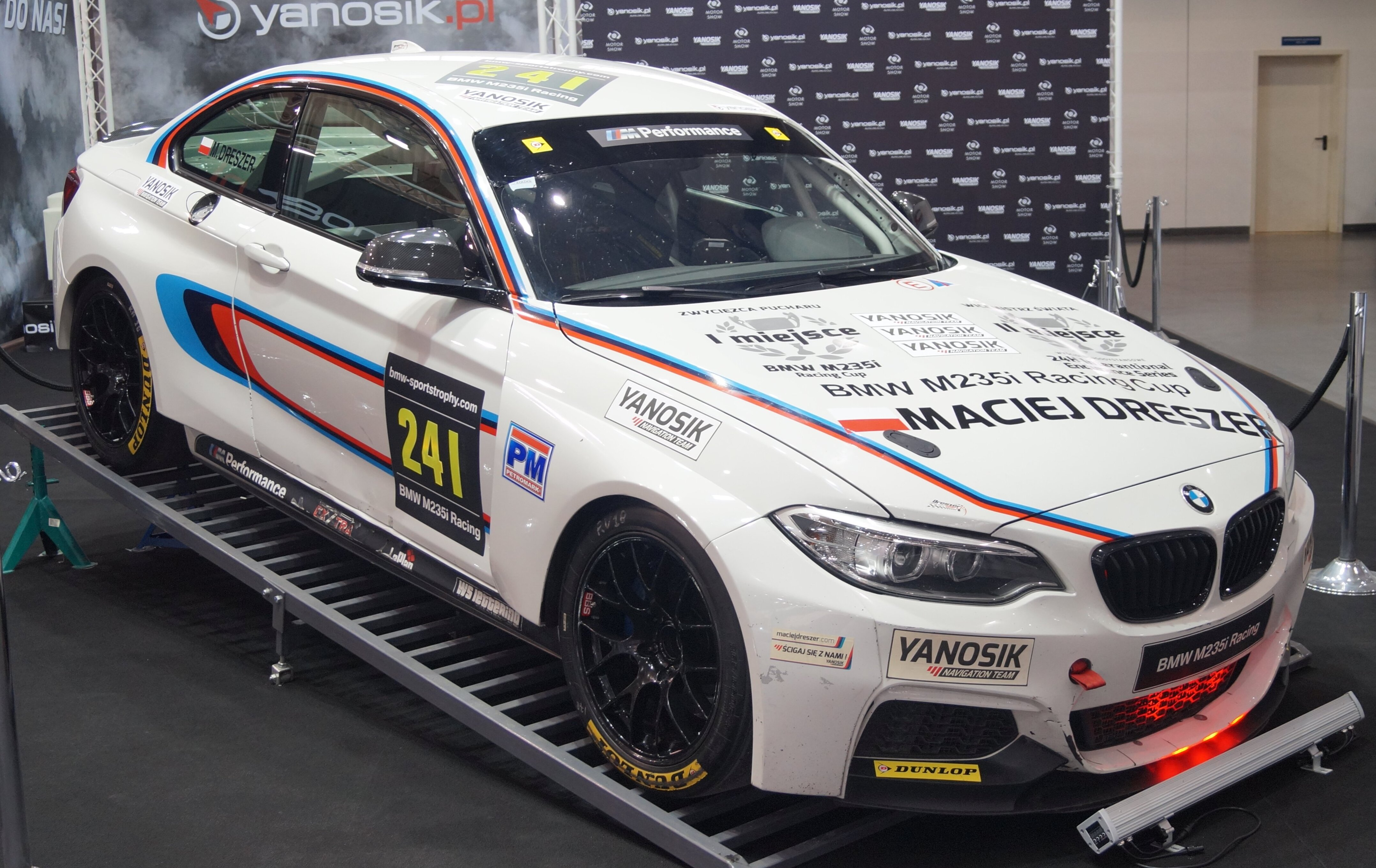
BMW M235i Racing

The M235i Racing is a track version of the 2 Series developed by the BMW Motorsport division and was produced from 2014 to 2018. It was aimed at amateur drivers due to its relatively lower price and addition of driver aids such as anti-lock brakes, traction control, and dynamic stability control. The M235i Racing uses an 8-speed automatic transmission and features a modified version of the N55B30O0 engine found in the standard M235i, and produces 329 hp (245 kW) at 5,800–6,000 rpm and 450 N⋅m (332 lb⋅ft) at 1,300–4,500 rpm. The M235i Racing also features a mechanical limited-slip differential and larger brakes and springs. The front and rear spoilers, diffuser, and wing mirrors are from the BMW M Performance Parts catalog. The car was used in the BMW M235i Racing Cup which was part of the VLN Endurance Championship at the Nürburgring. It was also sold to customer teams in other championships such as the 24H Series, Touring Car Endurance Series, and Pirelli World Challenge.

=== BMW M240i Racing ===
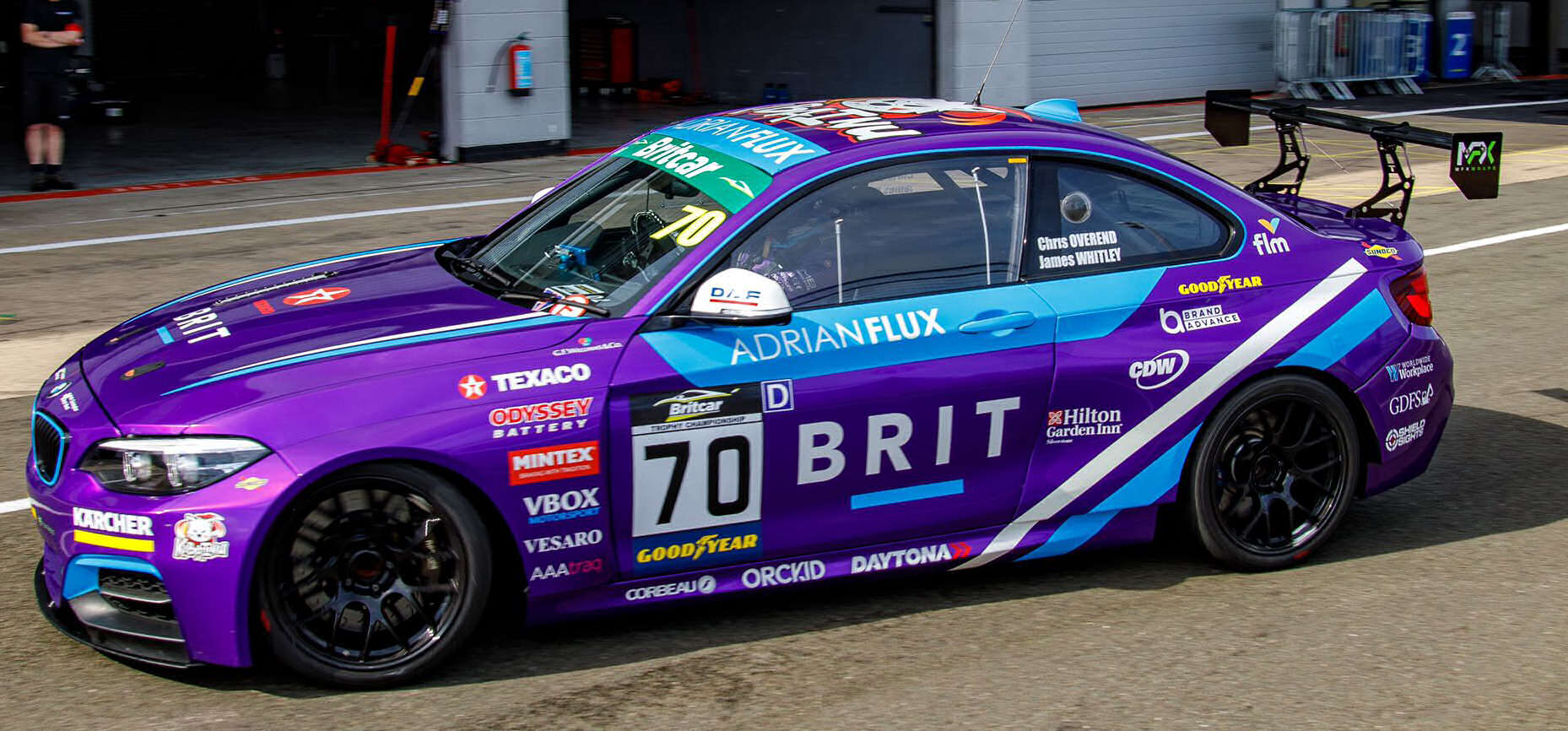
BMW 240i Racing

The BMW M240i Racing is an updated version heavily revised by BMW M Motorsport from its predecessor, the BMW M235i Racing, used from the 2019 season and on of the BMW M240i Racing Cup, from the 2019 season and on. The BMW M240i Racing features revised spoiler end plates, updated engine software, and an optional newly designed driver's seat. The M240i Racing has an increased power output of 340 hp (254 kW), and produces an additional 10 N⋅m (7 lb⋅ft) at 460 N⋅m (339 lb⋅ft), from the same 3-liter twin-turbo inline-6 from its predecessor. As it is a racecar, it still has an FIA-approved full roll cage, certified by DMSB. Deliveries started in 2020.

== Sales ==
| Year | China | | US |
| Year | 2-series | M2 | US |
|---|---|---|---|
| 2022 | | | 11,548 |
| 2023 | 10,027 | 1,138 | 11,620 |
| 2024 | 8,338 | 1,446 | 15,384 |
| 2025 | 12,659 | 720 | 20,975 |
