= Felino (disambiguation) =

Felino is a comune in the Province of Parma, Italy.

Felino may also refer to:

- Felino, an album by Electrocutango
- Felino CB7, Canadian sports car
- Felino Corporation, a Canadian automobile manufacturer
- Felino Exercise, part of a series of joint military exercises
- Salame Felino, specific variety of salami produced in Felino, Italy

== People ==
- El Felino (born 1964), Mexican professional wrestler
- Felino Dolloso (born 1980), Australian-Filipino actor
- Felino Jardim (born 1985), Dutch football player
- Felino Palafox (born 1950), Filipino architect
- Felino Maria Sandeo (1444–1503), Italian canonist
- El Felino (born 1964), Mexican professional wrestler

== See also ==
- Felinae, a subfamily of the family Felidae
