= BMW X6 =

Mid-size luxury crossover SUV

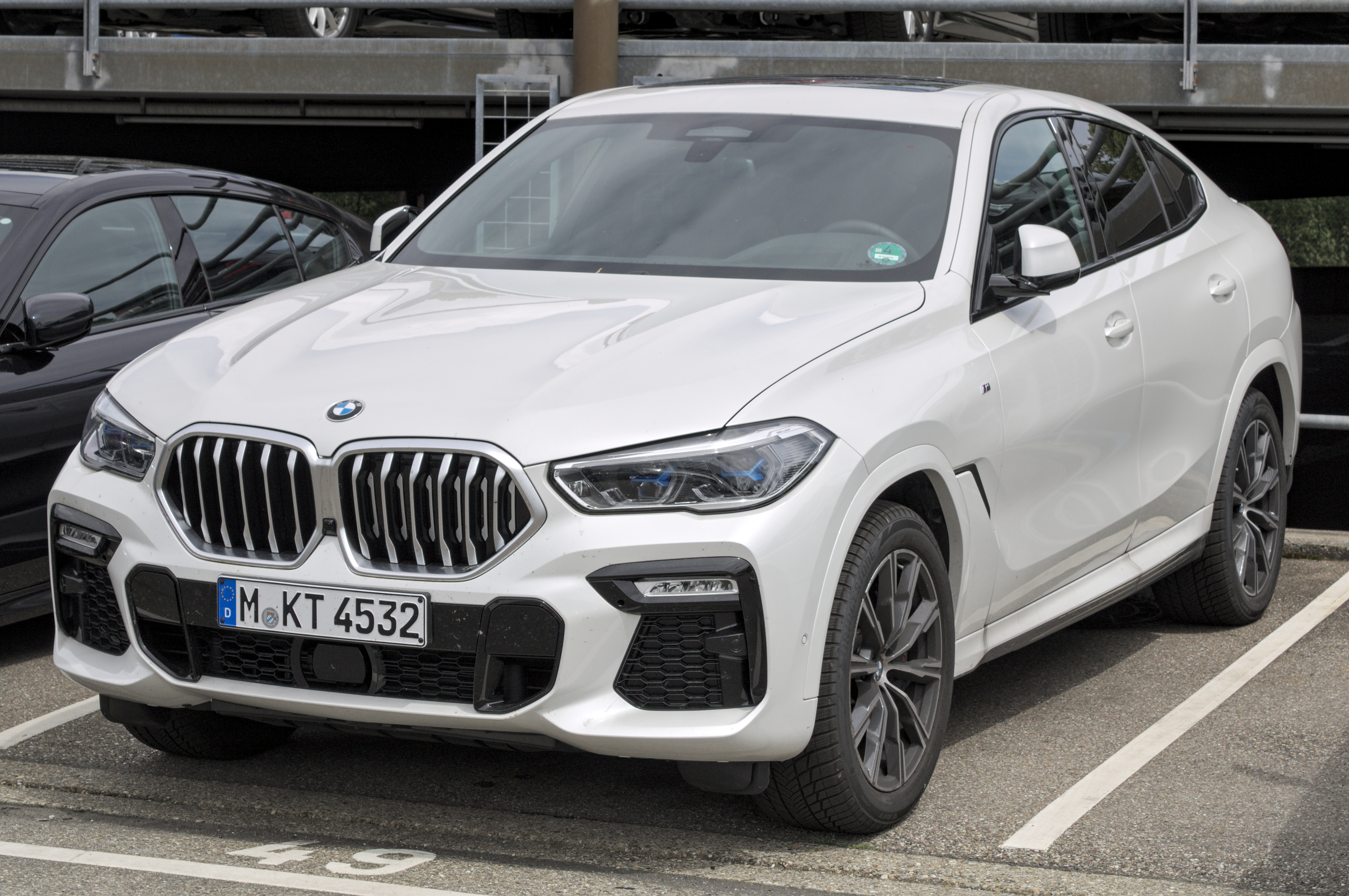
- BMW X6 (G06)

Overview
- Manufacturer: BMW
- Production: December 2007 – present
- Model years: 2008–present

Body and chassis
- Class: Mid-size luxury crossover SUV
- Body style: 5-door coupé SUV
- Layout: Front-engine, four-wheel-drive (xDrive)
- Related: BMW X5

The BMW X6 is a mid-size luxury crossover SUV by German automaker BMW. The BMW X6 is the originator of the sports activity coupé (SAC), referencing its sloping rear roof design. It combines the attributes of an SUV (high ground clearance, all-wheel drive and all-weather ability, large wheels and tires) with the stance of a coupé (styling featuring a sloping roof). It is built in BMW's North American plant in Greer, South Carolina alongside the BMW X5, whose platform it shares. Prior to the release of the X7, the X6 was considered a flagship SUV for BMW.

The first generation (E71) was released for sale in April 2008 for the 2008 model year, while the second-generation X6 (F16) was launched at the Paris Motor Show in 2014. The third-generation X6 was revealed in July 2019.

== BMW Concept X6 (2007) ==
The concept model debuted at the 2007 Frankfurt Auto Show and the production X6 officially debuted at the 2008 North American International Auto Show in Detroit and Montreal International Auto Show. While slightly longer and wider than the X5, it is significantly lower and seated initially only four, and since 2011, optionally five.

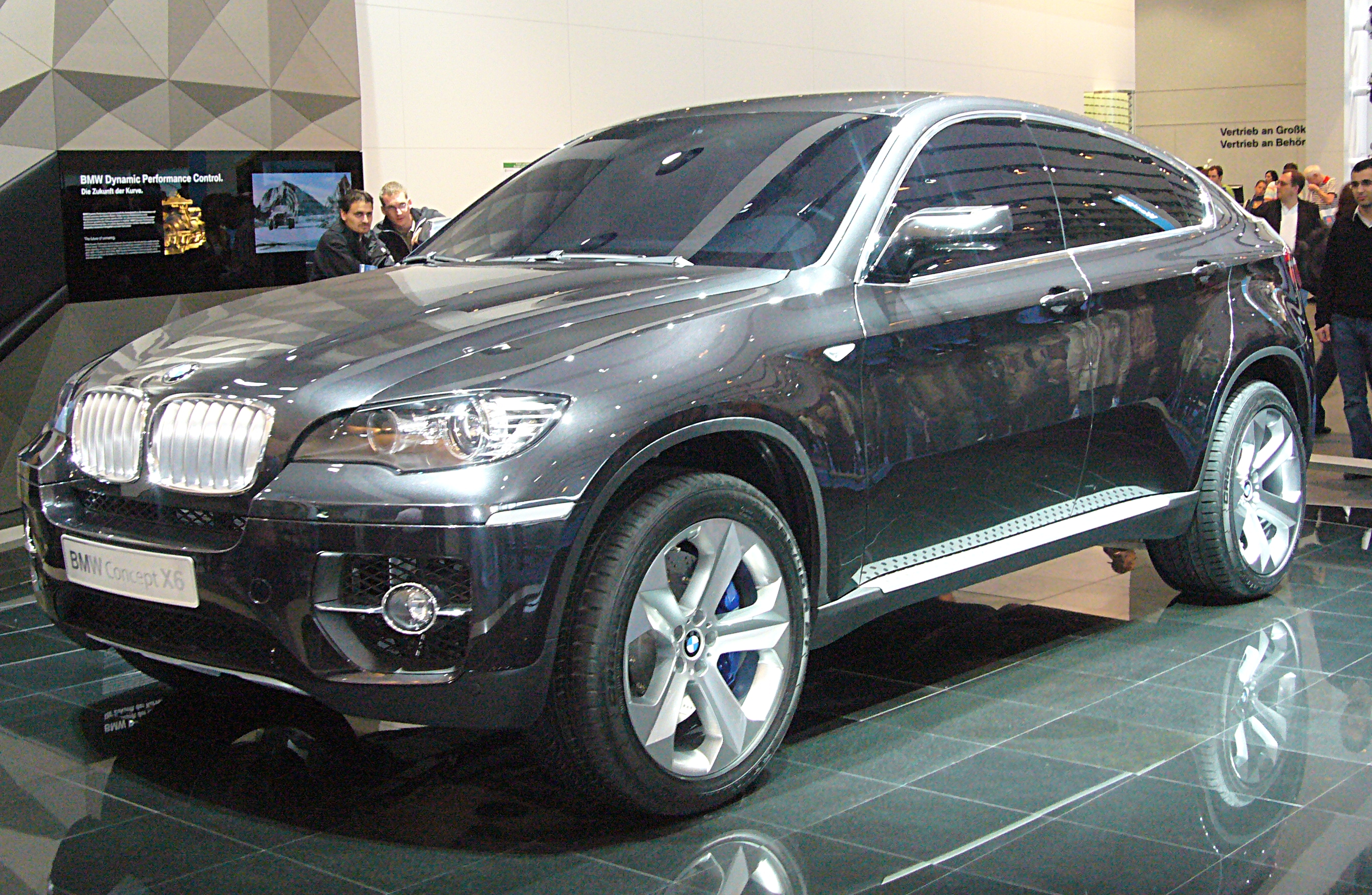
BMW Concept X6

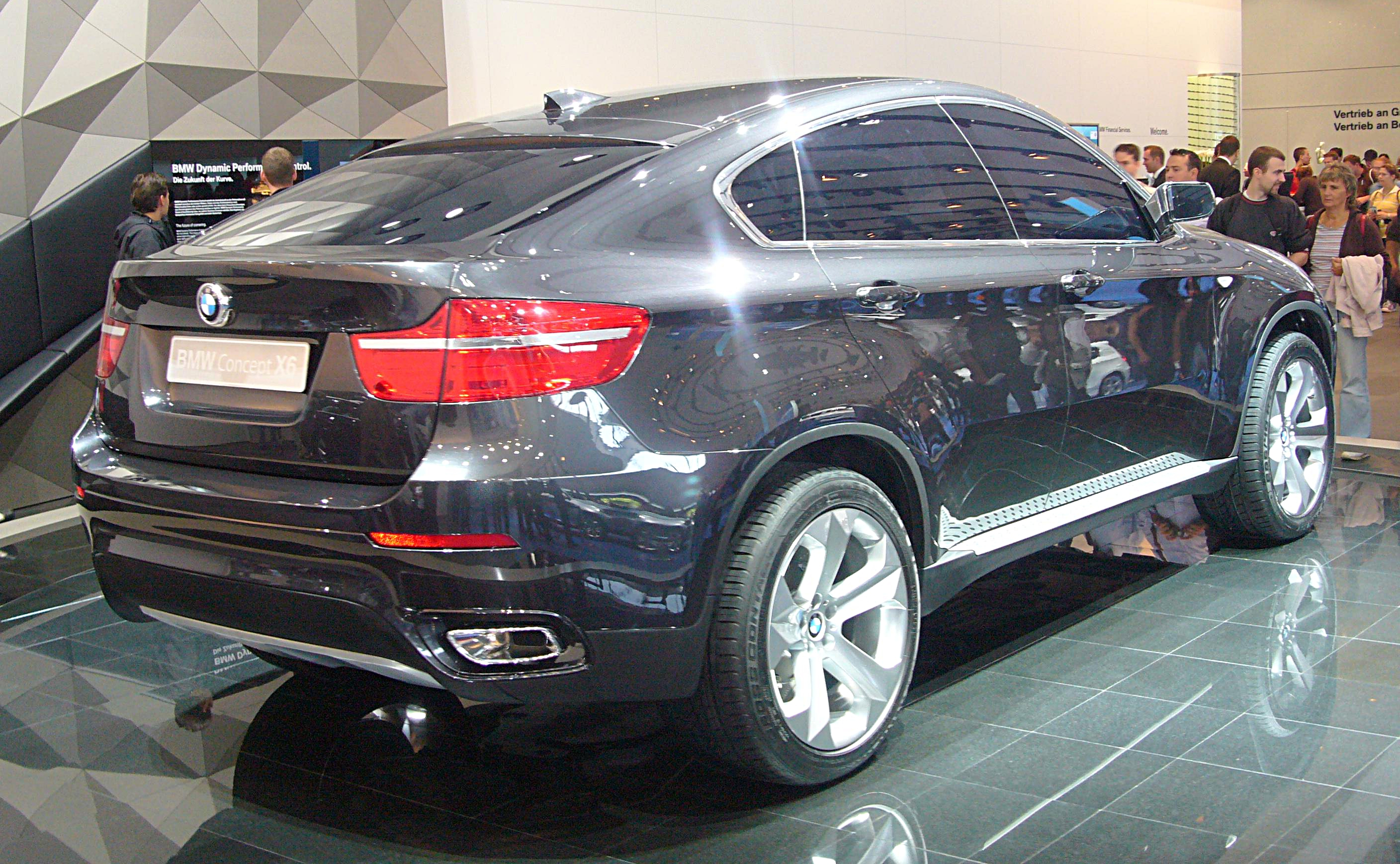

== First generation (E71; 2007) ==
First generation
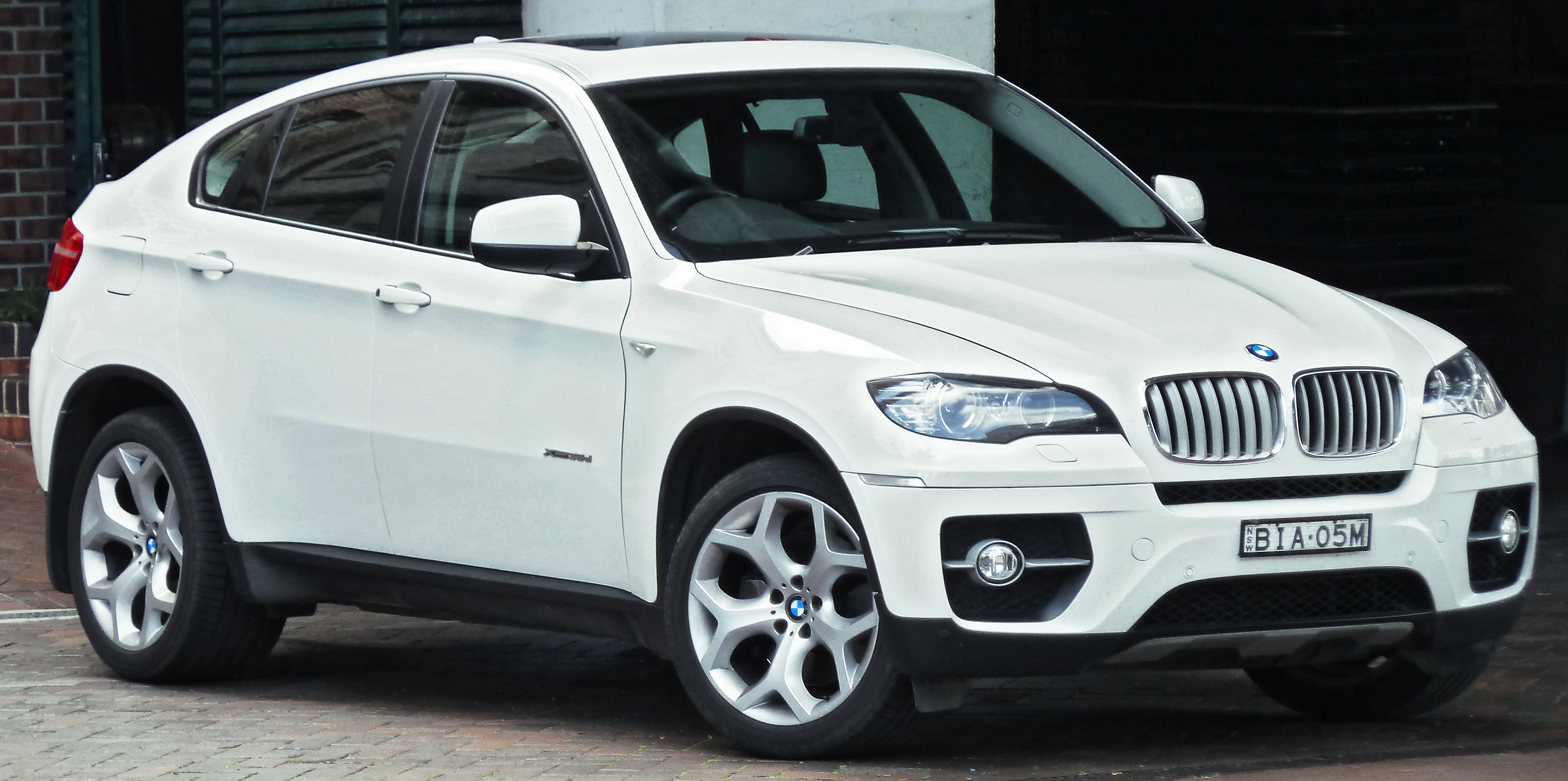

Overview
- Model code: E71
- Production: December 2007–2014
- Model years: 2008–2014
- Assembly: United States: Greer, South Carolina (Plant Spartanburg); Russia: Kaliningrad (Avtotor)
- Designer: Pierre Leclercq (2005)

Body and chassis
- Platform: BMW L4
- Related: BMW X5 (E70)

Powertrain
- Engine: 3.0 L I6 turbo (petrol); 3.0 L I6 turbo (diesel); 3.0 L I6 Tri-turbo (diesel); 4.4 L V8 turbo (petrol); 4.4 L V8 turbo (hybrid petrol; ActiveHybrid X6)
- Electric motor: 3-phase synchronous electric motor
- Transmission: 6-speed automatic 8-speed automatic 7-speed automatic (ActiveHybrid X6); 7-speed Two-mode Active ECVT (ActiveHybrid X6)
- Hybrid drivetrain: Parallel Hybrid (ActiveHybrid X6)

Dimensions
- Wheelbase: 2,933 mm (115.5 in)
- Length: 4,877–4,879 mm (192.0–192.1 in)
- Width: 1,979–1,984 mm (77.9–78.1 in)
- Height: 1,684–1,697 mm (66.3–66.8 in)

E71 development began in 2003 under Peter Tuennermann, after the start of E70 X5 development in 2001. Design work by E70 X5 designer Pierre Leclercq was frozen in 2005, with test mules being run from the summer of 2005 and prototypes being tested from late 2006. Production began on December 3, 2007.

The X6 marks BMW's first use of its new Dynamic Performance Control system, which works in unison with xDrive all-wheel drive, both being standard on the X6. DPC is a drivetrain and chassis control system that works to regulate traction and especially correct over- and understeer by actively spreading out drive forces across the rear axle. Torque is distributed not only between the front and rear wheels (xDrive) but also from side to side at the rear, for improved agility and added stability (through the DPC rear axle). This lateral distribution of torque is commonly known as torque vectoring.

The DPC differential features clutch packs on both output sides that are actuated by an electric motor. The clutch pack activates a planetary gearset which causes one wheel to be overdriven. A conventional control system will use the brakes to reduce the speed of the faster moving wheel (which is the one with less traction) and reduce engine power. This leads to increased brake wear and slower than optimal progress. The DPC system speeds up the slower moving wheel (the one with the most traction) in order to maintain stability when needed. For example; while turning, the outer wheel is overdriven to provide greater acceleration using the traction advantage through the dynamic loading of the outboard wheel in cornering. In an oversteer situation, the inner wheel is overdriven to regain traction balance.

Initially only available with four seats, a five-seat variant was available for the 2012 model year onwards.

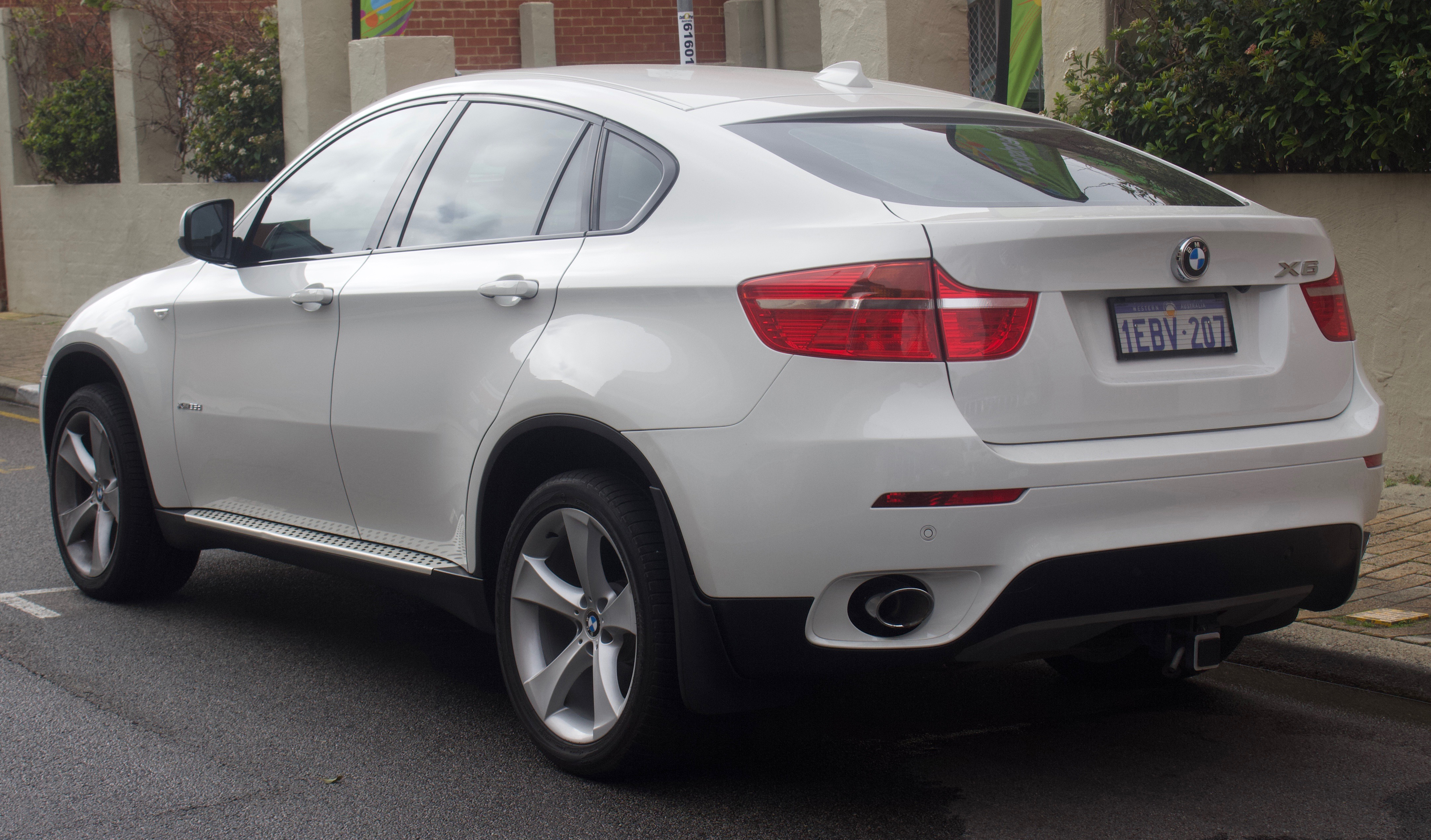
Rear view

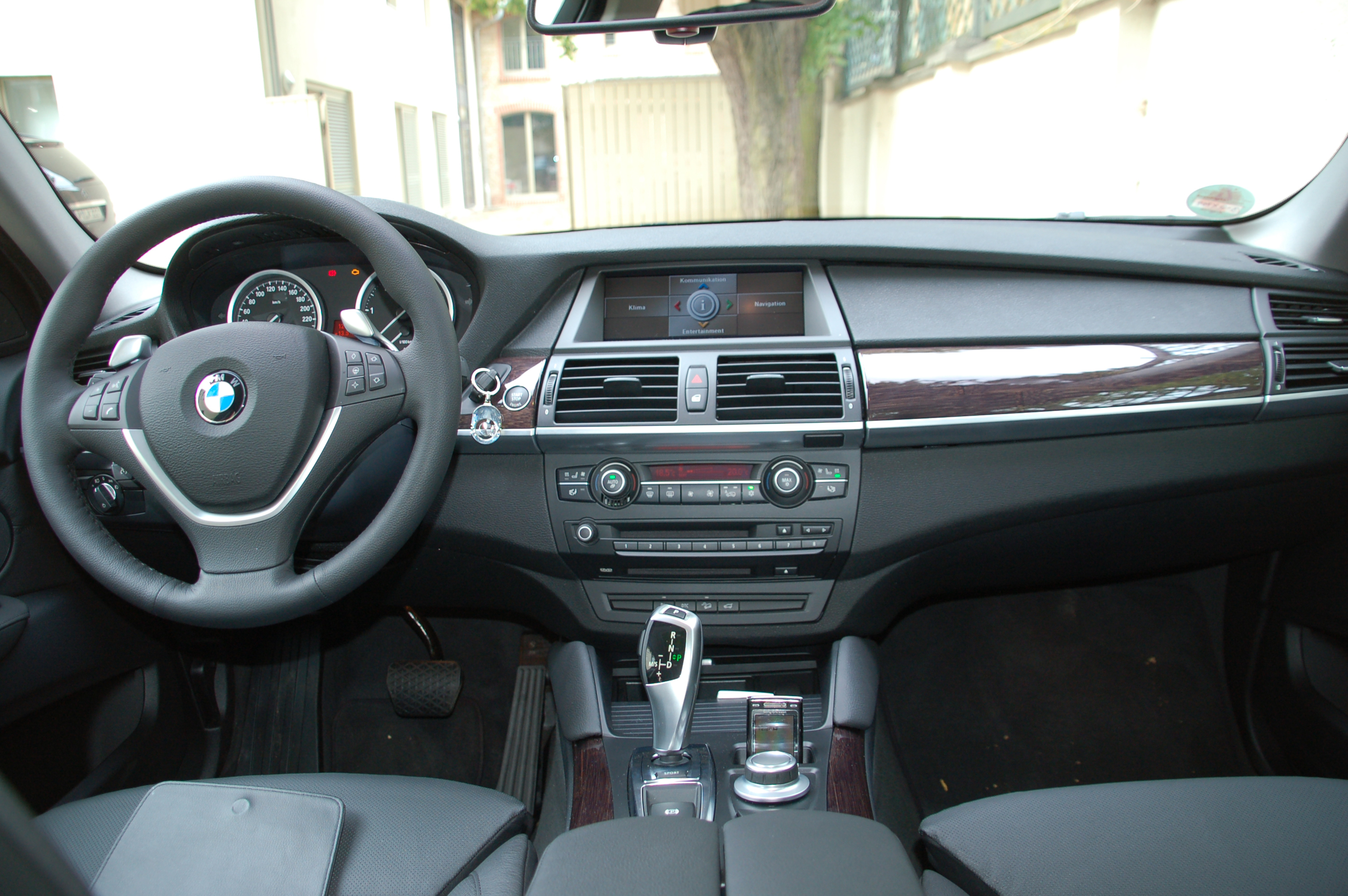
Interior

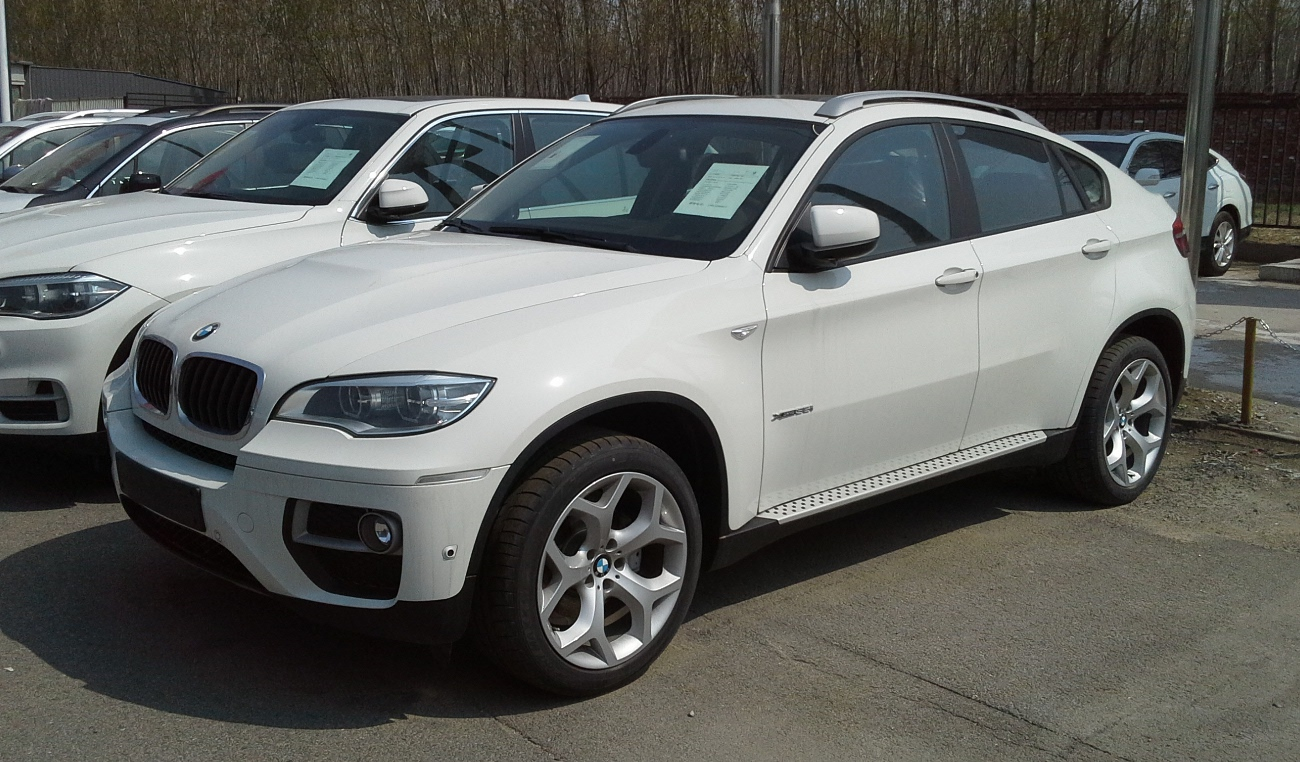
BMW X6 (facelift)

=== X6 M ===
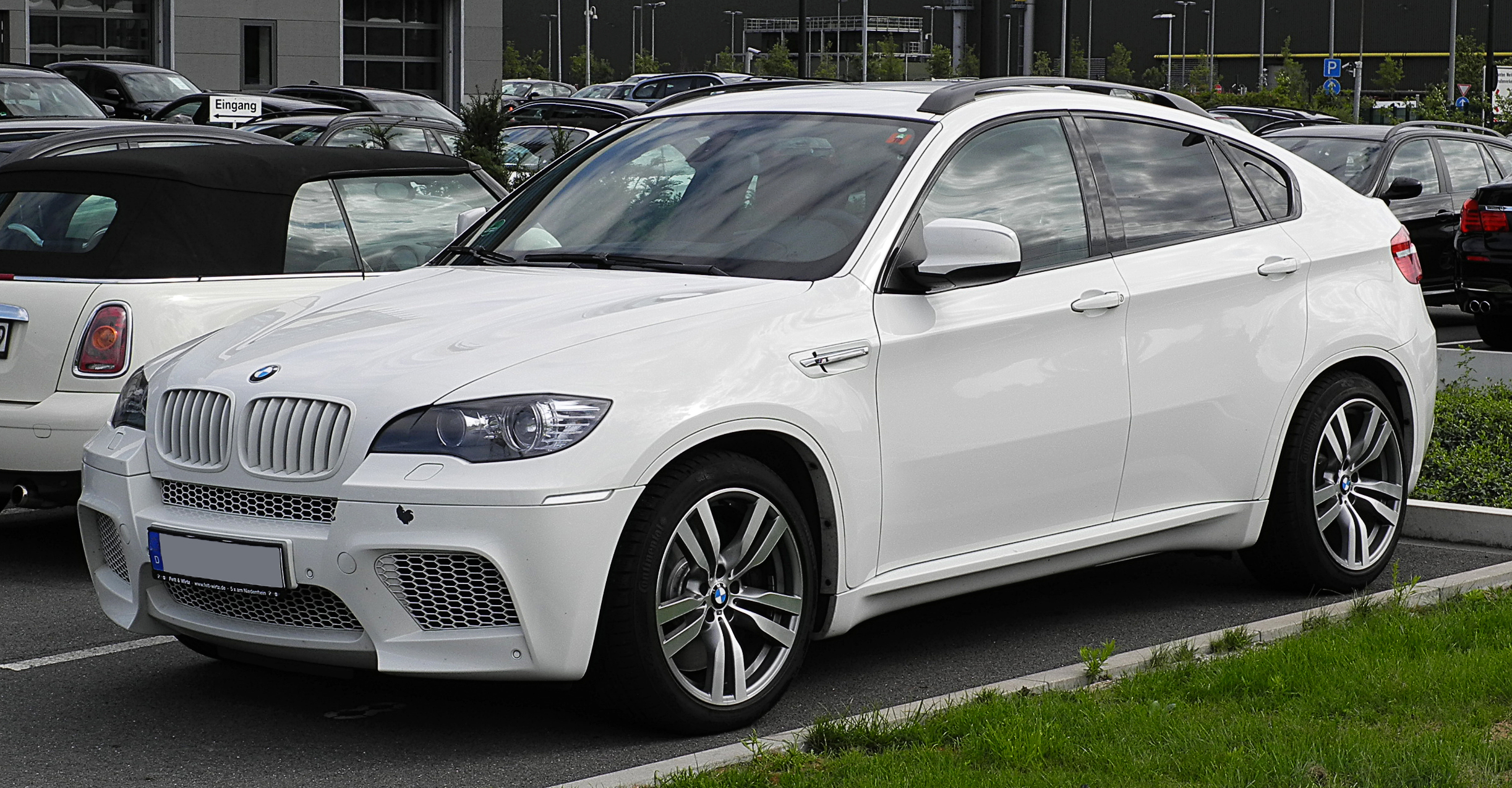

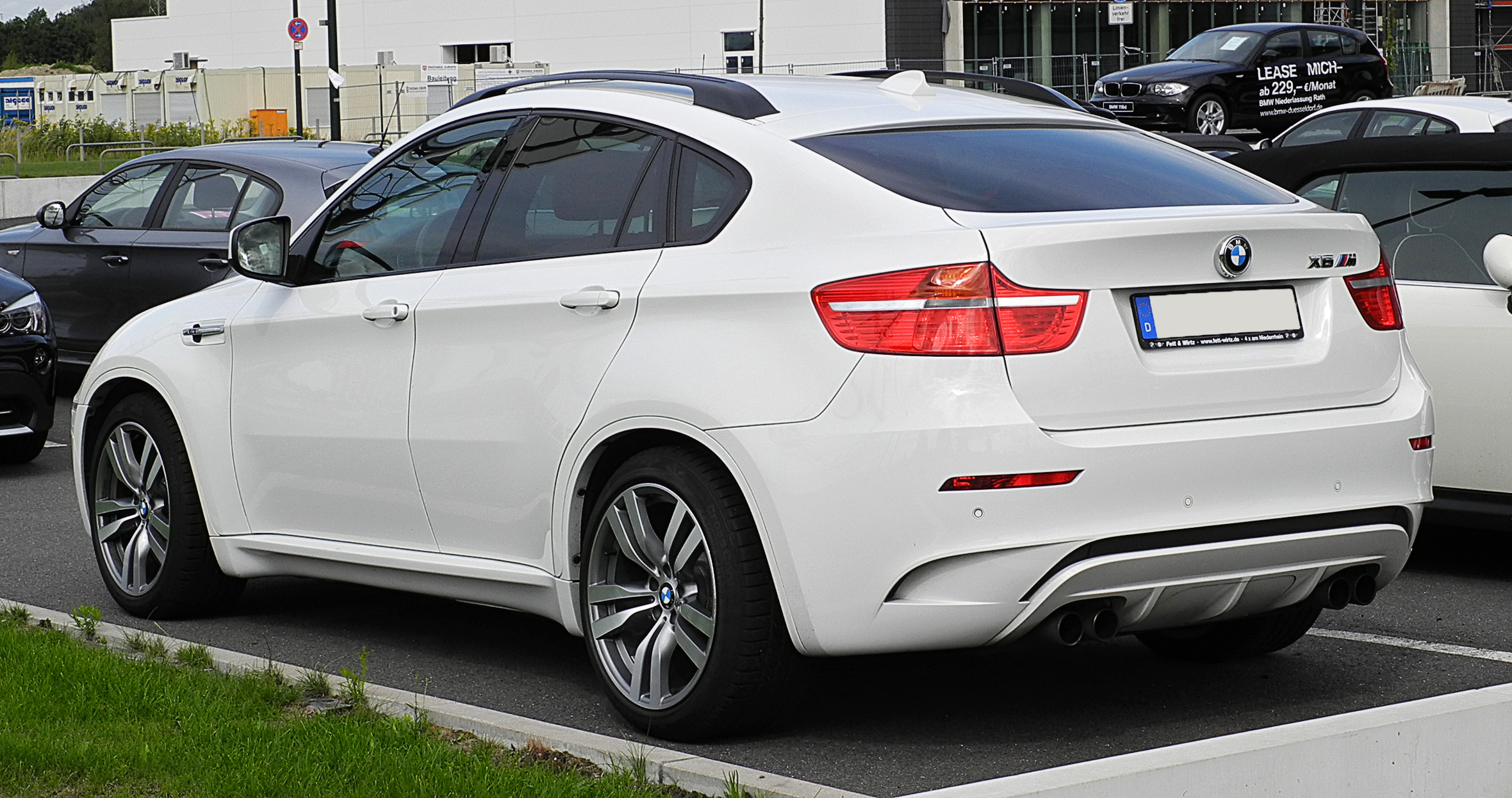
BMW X6 M

In April 2009, the X6 M version was announced, with a 408 kW (547 hp) version of the BMW S63 4.4-litre twin-turbo V8 engine.

The BMW X6 M and X5 M are the first vehicles from BMW M GmbH to have xDrive all-wheel-drive system and automatic transmissions, and are also crossovers as opposed to passenger cars. The X6 M was unveiled at the 2009 New York Auto Show and first went on sale in September 2009.

The high-performance M derivative features a twin scroll twin turbo version of the 4.4-litre V8 BMW S63 engine with the Cylinder-bank Comprehensive Manifold (CCM). The engine is rated 408 kW (547 hp) at 6,000 rpm and 677 N⋅m (499 lbf⋅ft) at 1,500–5,650 rpm.

Other features include 6-speed M Sports automatic transmission with aluminum pull-style paddles on the steering wheel, M Dynamic Mode feature, 10 mm (0.4 in) lower Adaptive Drive suspension, 4-piston fixed calipers with 15.6" rotor at front and single piston floating calipers with 15.2" rotor at rear, 20-inch alloy wheels with 275/40R20 front and 315/35R20 run flat tires, hill descent control, dynamic stability control, special gills in the front fenders, 20-inch light-alloy wheels.

The car can accelerate from 0–60 mph (0–97 km/h) in 4.5 seconds and 0–62 mph (0–100 km/h) in 4.7 seconds.

M Performance Parts were available for the X6 M. These include black kidney grilles, a carbon fibre spoiler, steel pedals, a sport steering wheel and M rims.

=== ActiveHybrid X6 (E72) ===
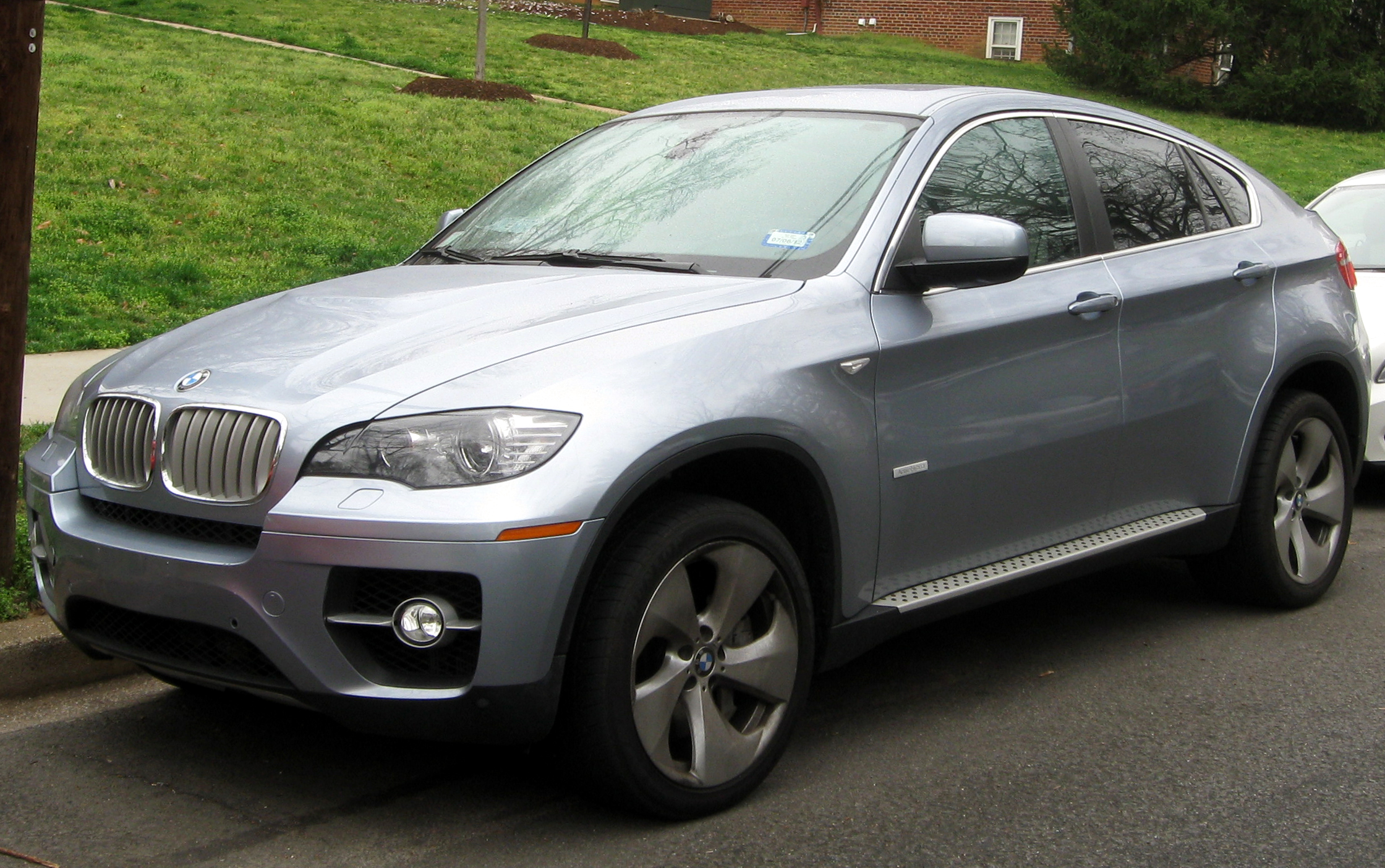
BMW X6 ActiveHybrid

The BMW Concept X6 ActiveHybrid is the concept vehicle of BMWs first full-hybrid vehicle and was revealed at the Internationale Automobil-Ausstellung Frankfurt in September 2007. BMWs first mild-hybrid BMW Concept 7 Series ActiveHybrid Generation 1 was revealed at the Paris Motor Show in October 2008. Both cars made their market debuts at the end of 2009 and the X6 Hybrid can drive in pure electrical mode at low speeds. The Active Hybrid 7 Generation 1 does not have this ability.

The BMW Concept X6 ActiveHybrid uses the V8 Twin Turbo with High Precision Injection that powers the BMW X6 xDrive50i.

A defining feature of the BMW Concept X6 ActiveHybrid is its Two-Mode active transmission, an innovative technology that controls the interplay of the electrical motors and the internal combustion engine. The car can operate in two modes: mode 1 delivers high torque when pulling away from a standing start and at low speeds, while mode 2 is suited for higher speeds. The result is that the car always uses the available power resources in the most efficient possible way, whatever speed it is travelling at.

The ActiveHybrid X6 made its world premiere at the Frankfurt Motor Show (IAA) in September 2009.

In late 2009, BMW introduced an X6 featuring a version of the Global Hybrid Cooperation hybrid vehicle drivetrain, popularly known as the two-mode hybrid system. This car was confirmed as being called the BMW ActiveHybrid X6, and it is the world's most powerful hybrid vehicle; it is not sold in the UK. The production vehicle was unveiled alongside a 7 Series hybrid at the 2009 Frankfurt Motor Show. The ActiveHybrid X6 went on sale in December 2009 in the US market with a base price of US$89,765 (~$130,735 in 2025).

The drive system featured in the BMW ActiveHybrid X6 consists of a 300 kW (402 hp) V8 power unit with BMW TwinPower Turbo Technology and two electric motors developing 67 kW (90 hp) and, respectively, 63 kW (84 hp). Maximum system output is 357 kW (479 hp) and peak torque is 780 N⋅m (575 lbf⋅ft).

BMW ActiveHybrid technology offers the driver three significant options: to drive under electric power alone, to use the power of the combustion engine, or to benefit from the combination of both drive modes for short periods of maximum acceleration, using the 485 hp (362 kW) maximum. Driving completely free of CO_{2} in the electric mode is possible up to a speed of 37 mph (60 km/h). The hybrid also employs stop-start technology and other energy saving measures to help improve efficiency. The core-vehicle is however very heavy and the petrol power unit limits the extent to which fuel consumption can be reduced in absolute terms. The Turbo-Diesel models in the X6 range use less fuel, for example.

=== Engines ===
The base model is the X6 xDrive35i which is powered by the 225 kW version of the N54 3.0-litre twin-turbocharged inline-six gasoline engine. The top-of-the-line model is the xDrive50i which uses the N63 V8 engine, producing 300 kW (402 hp).

At launch, the X6 was available in many markets with two diesel variants: the xDrive30d and xDrive35d, respectively. They are powered by BMW's 3.0-litre turbodiesel engine (in its sequential twin-turbocharged variant for the xDrive35d), and produces 173 kW (232 hp) in the xDrive30d and 210 kW (282 hp) in the xDrive35d version. The second of these power units formed the basis of BMW's diesel launch in all 50 states in late 2008.

By 2010, a new 40d was added to the range, replacing the 35d, and in 2012 a new high-performance M50d was added, but despite its nomenclature, is still powered by a 3.0-litre engine.

==== Petrol engines ====
Model	Engine	Power	Torque
xDrive35i (N54)	3.0 L N54 straight-6 twin-turbo	225 kW (306 PS; 302 hp) at 5,800–6,250	400 N⋅m (295 lb⋅ft) at 1,300–5,000
xDrive35i (N55)	3.0 L N55 straight-6 turbo	225 kW (306 PS; 302 hp) at 5,800	400 N⋅m (295 lb⋅ft) at 1,200–5,000
xDrive50i	4.4 L N63; V8 twin-turbo	300 kW (408 PS; 402 hp) at 5,500–6,400	600 N⋅m (443 lb⋅ft) at 1,750–4,500
X6 M	4.4 L S63; V8 twin-turbo	408 kW (555 PS; 547 hp) at 6,000	677 N⋅m (499 lb⋅ft) at 1,500–5,650
ActiveHybrid X6	4.4 L N63 V8 twin-turbo; w/ electric motor	357 kW (485 PS; 479 hp) (combined)	780 N⋅m (575 lb⋅ft) (combined)

==== Diesel engines ====
Model	Engine	Power	Torque
xDrive30d (M57)	3.0 L M57 straight-6 turbo	173 kW (232 hp) at 4,000	520 N⋅m (384 lb⋅ft) at 2,000–2,750
xDrive30d (N57)	3.0 L N57 straight-6 turbo	180 kW (241 hp) at 4,000	540 N⋅m (398 lb⋅ft) at 1,750–3,000
xDrive35d	3.0 L M57 straight-6 turbo	210 kW (282 hp) at 4,400	580 N⋅m (428 lb⋅ft) at 1,750–2,250
xDrive40d	3.0 L N57 straight-6 turbo	225 kW (302 hp) at 4,400	600 N⋅m (443 lb⋅ft) at 1,500
M50d	3.0 L N57 straight-6 tri-turbo	280 kW (375 hp) at 4,000–4,400	740 N⋅m (546 lb⋅ft) at 2,000–3,000

== Second generation (F16; 2014) ==
Second generation
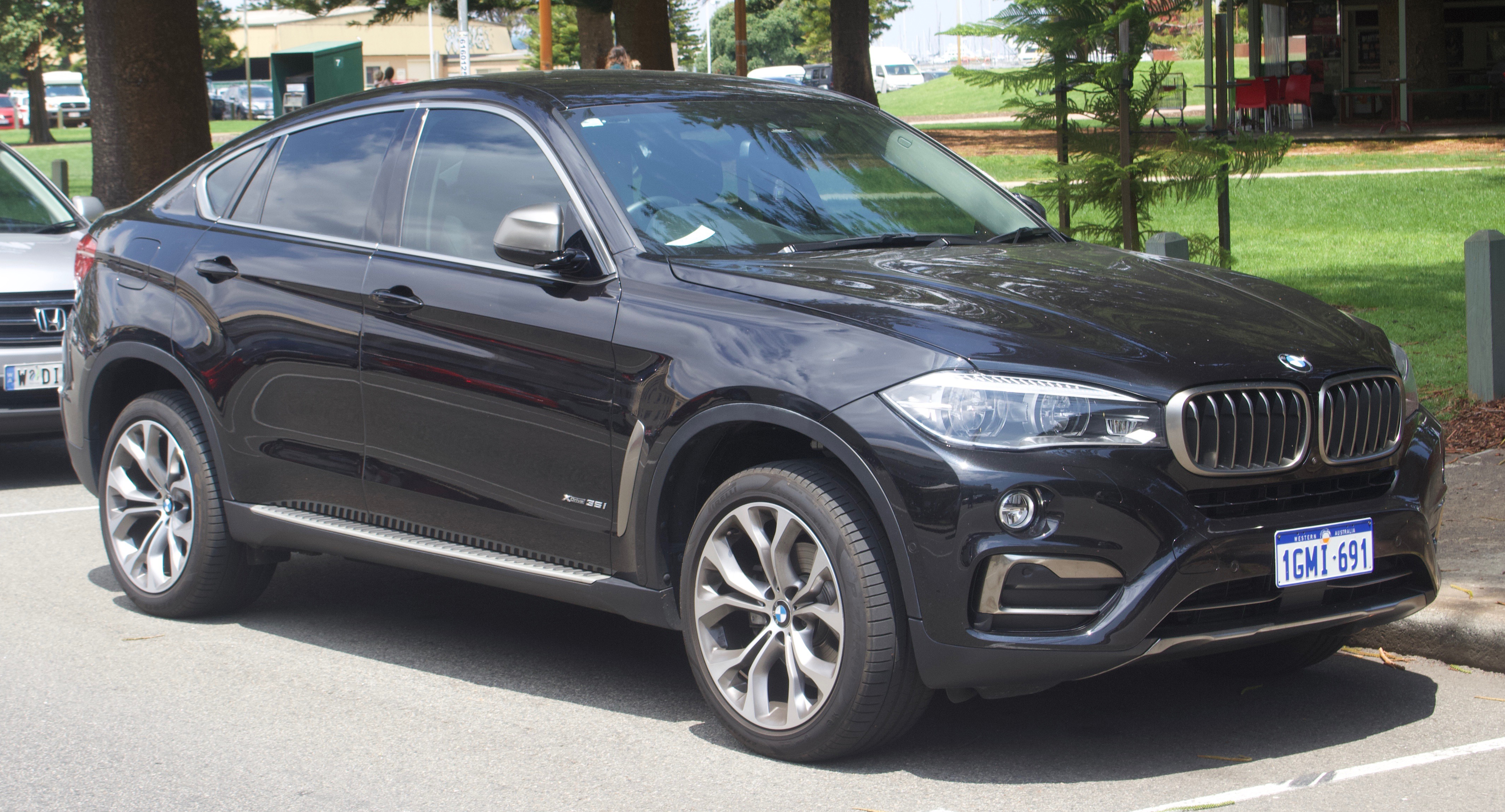

Overview
- Model code: F16
- Production: 2014–2019
- Model years: 2015–2019
- Assembly: United States: Greer, South Carolina (Plant Spartanburg); Malaysia: Kulim, Kedah (Inokom); Egypt: 6th of October City
- Designer: Tommy Forsgren; Florian Nissl (X6 M)

Body and chassis
- Platform: BMW L4
- Related: BMW X5 (F15)

Powertrain
- Engine: 3.0 L I6 turbo (petrol); 3.0 L I6 turbo (diesel); 4.4 L V8 turbo (petrol)
- Transmission: 8-speed automatic

Dimensions
- Wheelbase: 2,933 mm (115.5 in)
- Length: 4,909 mm (193.3 in)
- Width: 1,989 mm (78.3 in)
- Height: 1,702 mm (67.0 in)
- Curb weight: 2,100–2,340 kg (4,629.7–5,158.8 lb)

The second generation X6 was launched at the 2014 Paris Motor Show featuring a new eight-speed automatic transmission and a slightly larger luggage bay. Sales in most markets commenced by the end of 2014.

Like the other models in the BMW range powered by the twin-turbo 4.4-litre V-8, the xDrive50i benefits from increased the power of a newer engine, which is 50 hp (37 kW) and 30 lb⋅ft (41 N⋅m) more than its predecessor rising to 445 hp (332 kW) at 5500 rpm and 480 lb⋅ft (651 N⋅m) of torque at 2000 rpm.

The X6 M (F86) BMW M performance model was unveiled in Losail International Circuit in Qatar, and is one of the quickest vehicles of its type.

M Performance Parts can be fitted to 25-50 models with the M Sport trim. These include a sport steering wheel, carbon fibre trim, aluminium pedals, black kidney grilles, M Rims, mirrors, rear flaps, diffuser, splitter, spoiler in carbon fibre, black side skirts and sport brakes. 30d and 35i models can get a power boost kit increasing power and torque to 277 hp (207 kW) and 584 N⋅m (431 lbf⋅ft) on the 30d and to 326 hp (243 kW) and 450 N⋅m (332 lbf⋅ft) on the 35i.

Full M models have their own M Performance Parts. These include black kidney grilles, a carbon fibre gear selector, a sport steering wheel, carbon fibre mirrors, black side vents, carbon fibre trim and fuel filler cap.

Standard trim BMW X6 F16 models get softer and more comfortable suspension and tire setup with a more executive design and the addition of optional side steps.

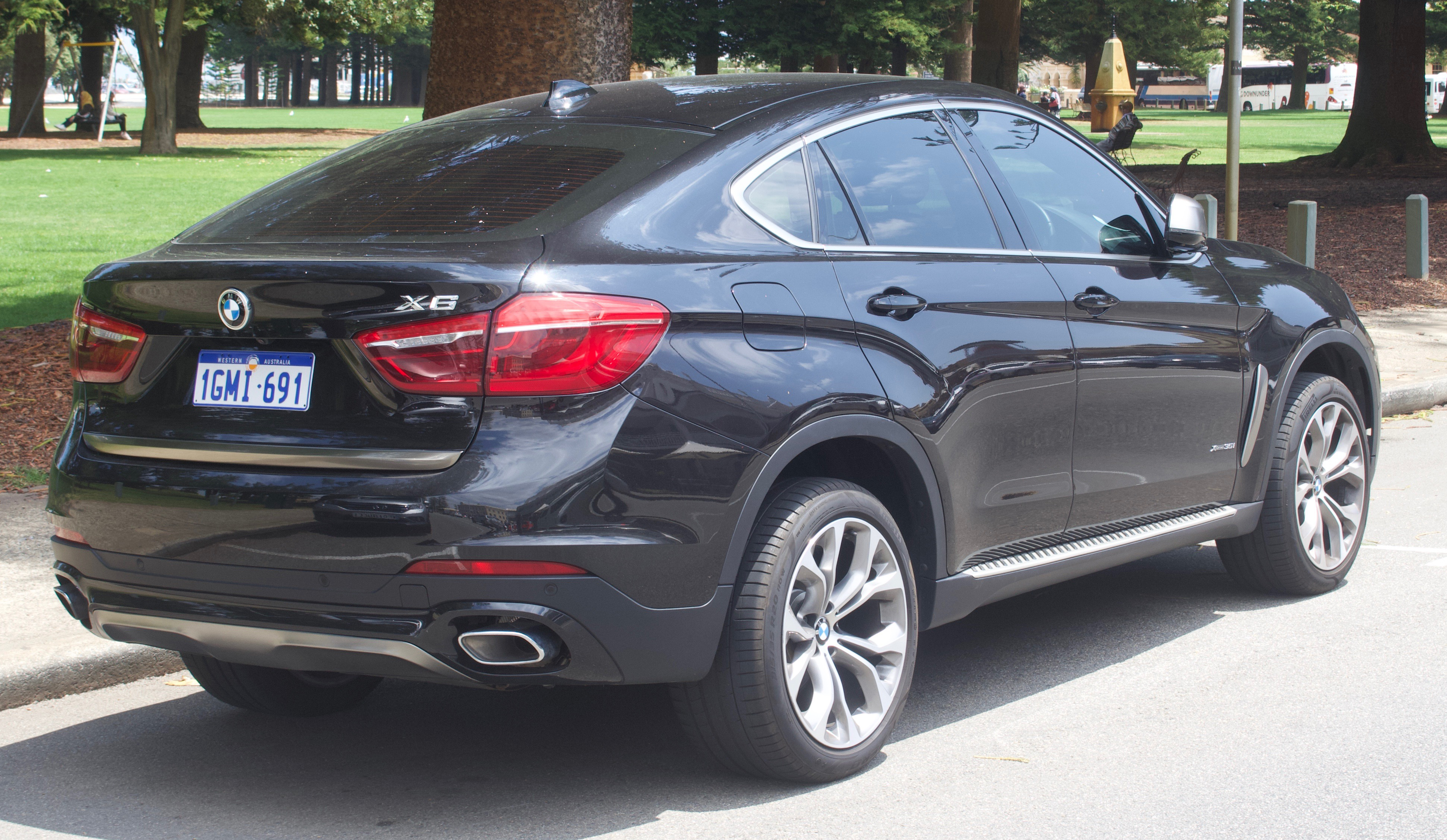
Rear view

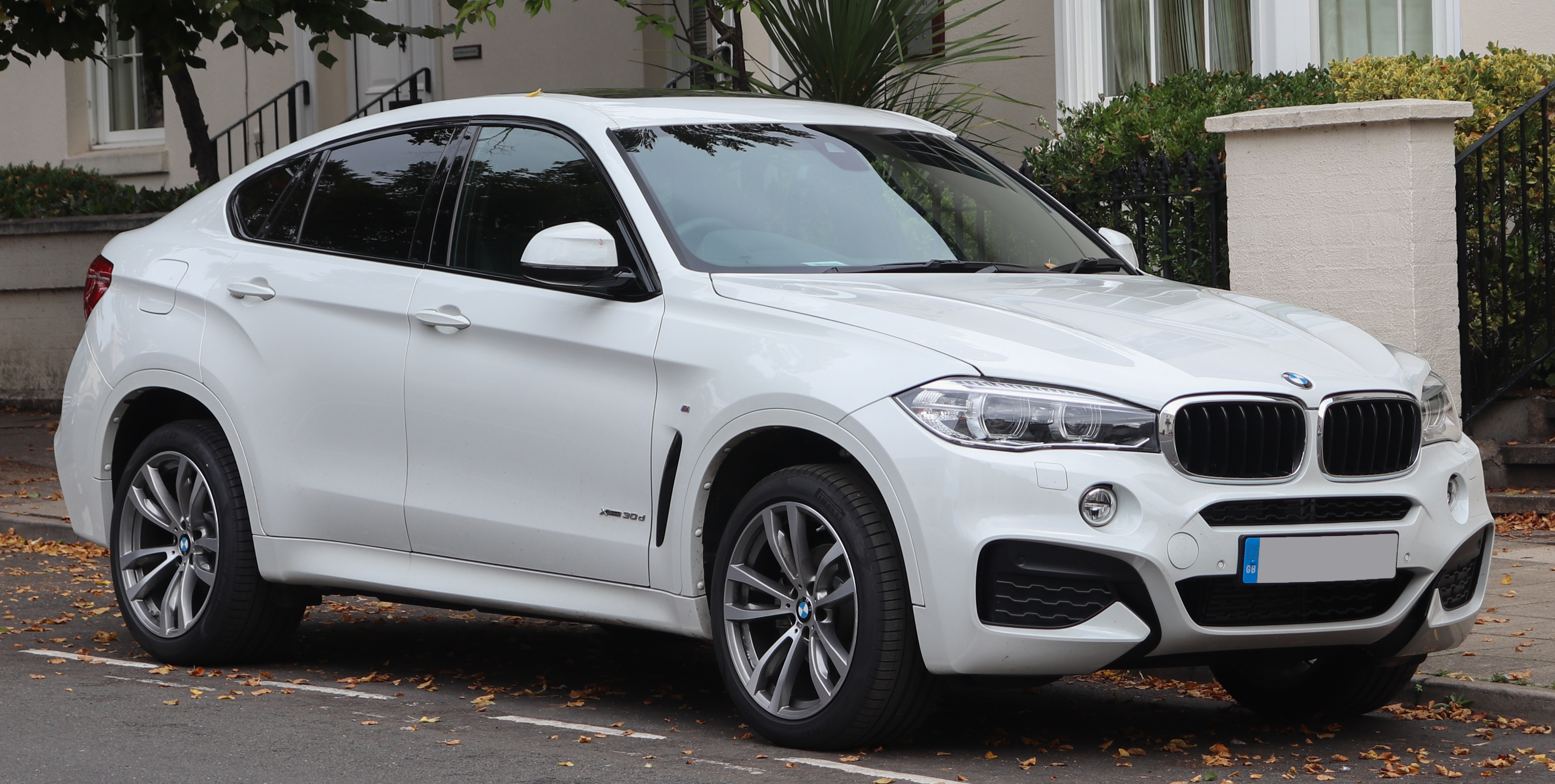
BMW X6 M Sport

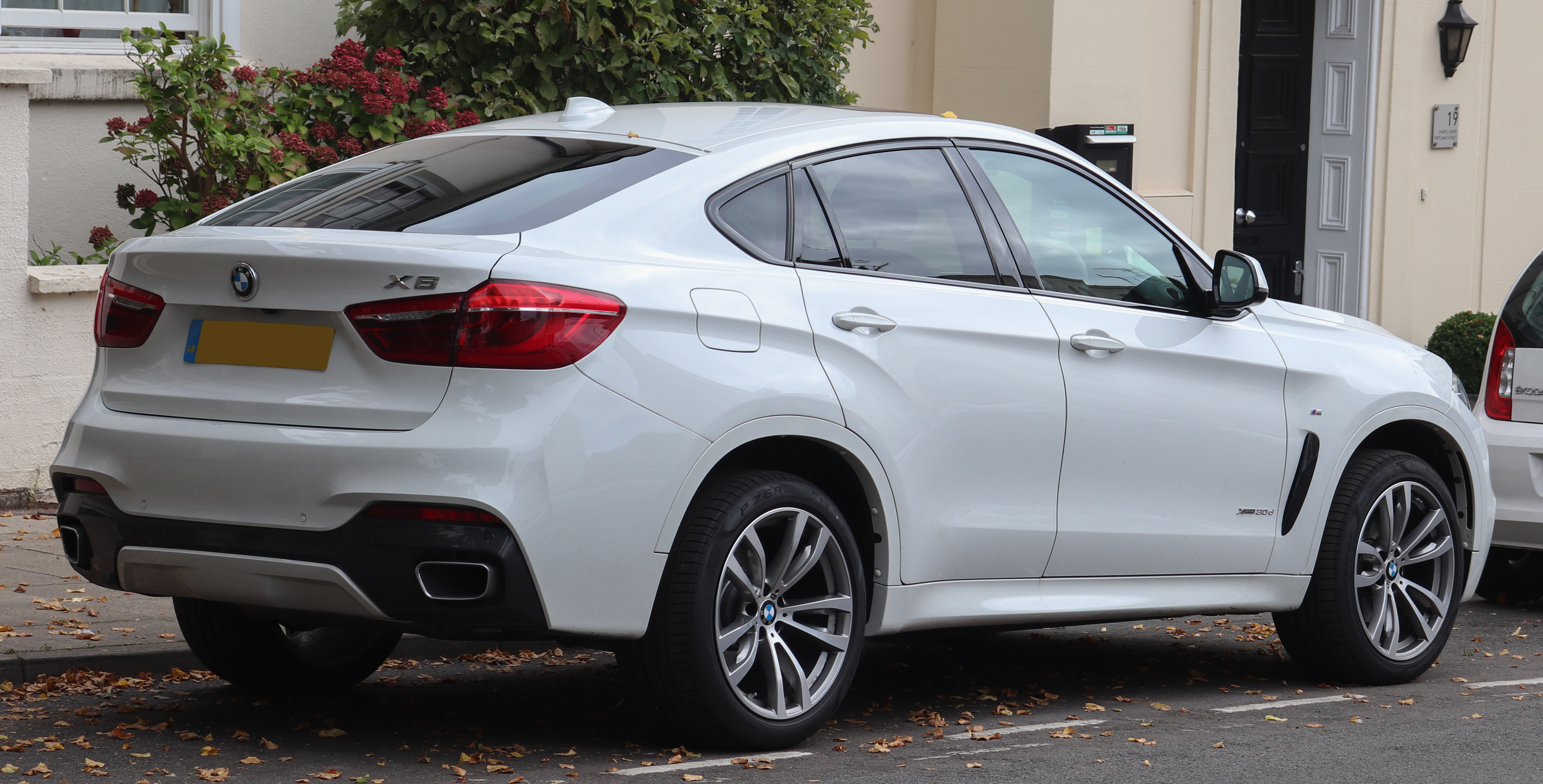
Rear view (M Sport)

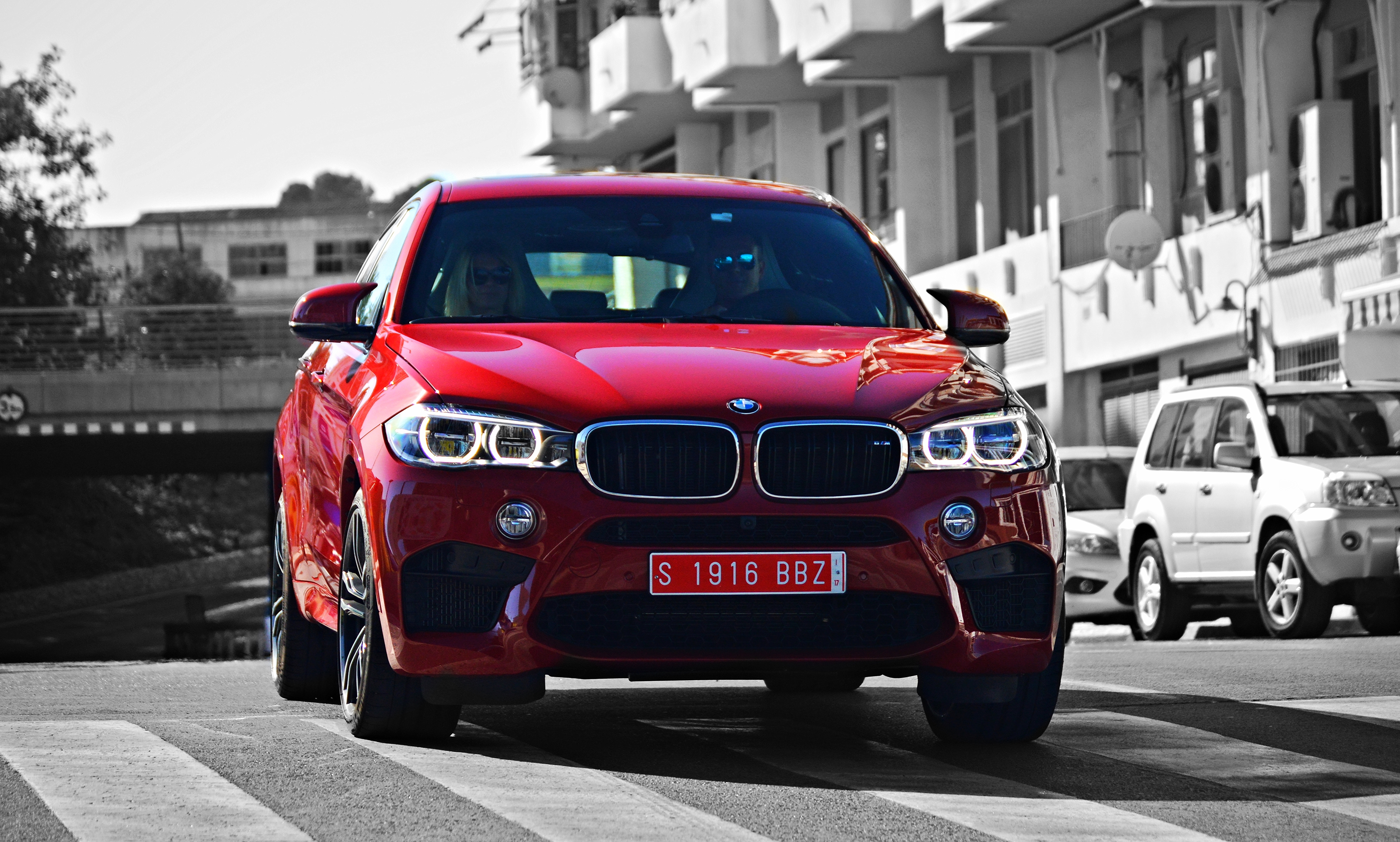
BMW X6 M

=== Petrol engines ===
Model	Years	Engine	Power	Torque	0–100 km/h (0–62 mph)	CO_{2} Emissions
xDrive35i	2015–2019	3.0 L N55 straight-6 turbo	225 kW (302 hp) at 5800 rpm	400 N⋅m (295 ft⋅lb_{f}) at 1200 rpm	6.4 s	198 g/km
xDrive50i	2015–2019	4.4 L N63 V8 twin-turbo	331 kW (444 hp) at 5500 rpm	650 N⋅m (479 ft⋅lb_{f}) at 2000 rpm	4.8 s	225 g/km
X6 M	2015–2019	4.4 L S63 V8 twin-turbo	423 kW (567 hp) at 6000 rpm	750 N⋅m (553 ft⋅lb_{f}) at 2200 rpm	4.2 s	258 g/km

=== Diesel engines ===
Model	Years	Engine	Power	Torque	0–100 km/h (0–62 mph)	CO_{2} Emissions
xDrive30d	2015–2019	3.0 L N57 straight-6 turbo	190 kW (255 hp)	560 N⋅m (413 ft⋅lb_{f})	6.7 s	157 g/km
xDrive40d	2015–2019	3.0 L N57 straight-6 turbo	233 kW (312 hp)	630 N⋅m (465 ft⋅lb_{f})	5.8 s	163 g/km
M50d	2015–2019	3.0 L N57 straight-6 turbo	280 kW (375 hp)	740 N⋅m (546 ft⋅lb_{f})	5.2 s	174 g/km

== Third generation (G06; 2019) ==
Third generation
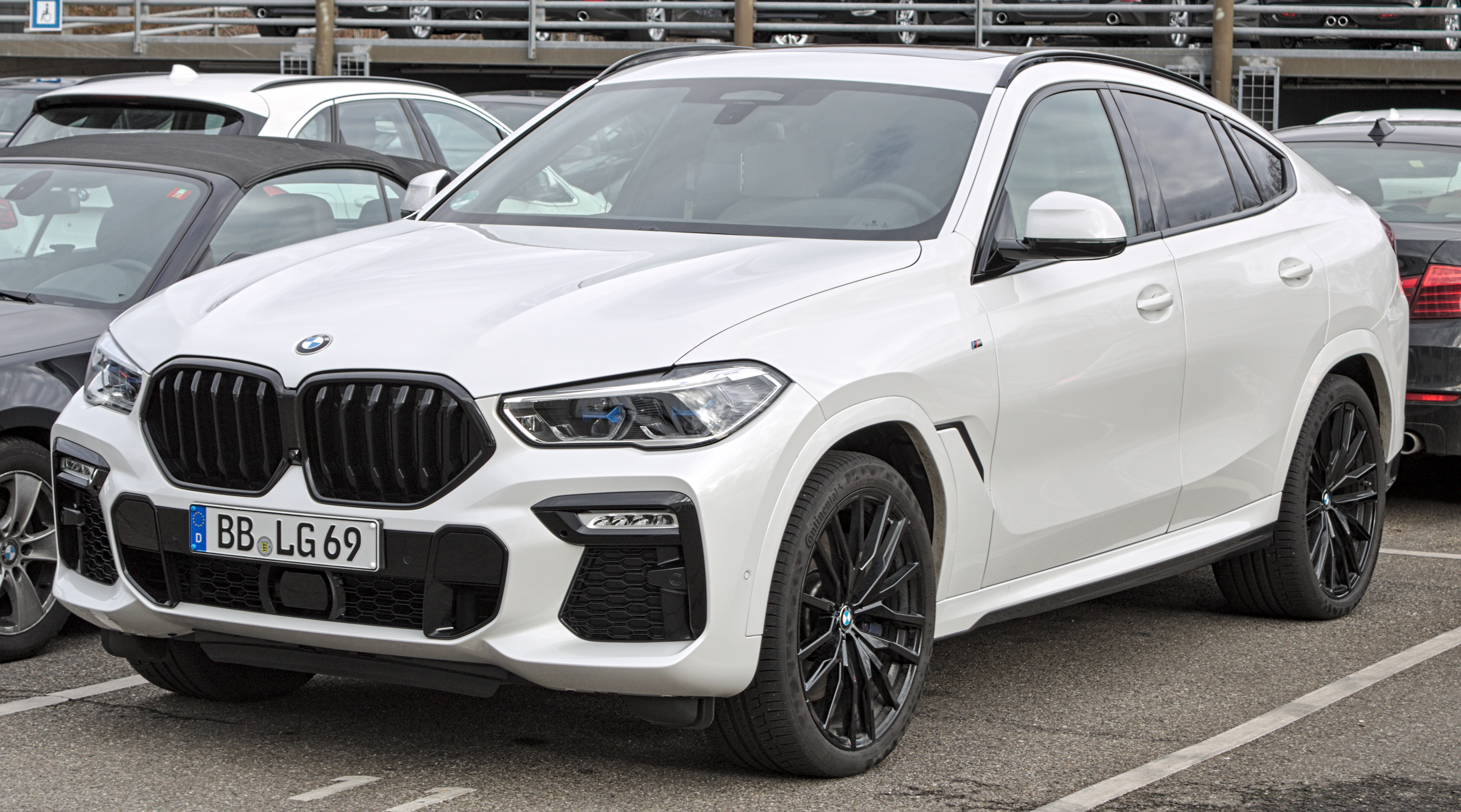
- Pre-facelift

Overview
- Model code: G06
- Production: August 2019 – present
- Model years: 2020–present
- Assembly: United States: Greer, South Carolina (Plant Spartanburg); Thailand: Rayong (BMW Thailand; 2022)
- Designer: Hussein Al-Attar

Body and chassis
- Platform: BMW CLAR platform
- Related: BMW X5 (G05); BMW X7 (G07)

Powertrain
- Engine: Petrol: 2.0 L B48 turbo I4; 3.0 L B58 turbo I6; 4.4 L N63 twin-turbo V8; 4.4 L S63 twin-turbo V8 (2019–2023); 4.4 L S68 twin-turbo V8 (since 2023); Diesel: 2.0 L B47 turbo I4; 3.0 L B57 turbo I6; 3.0 L B57 quad-turbo I6
- Transmission: 8-speed ZF 8HP automatic
- Hybrid drivetrain: Mild hybrid

Dimensions
- Wheelbase: 2,975 mm (117.1 in)
- Length: 4,935 mm (194.3 in)
- Width: 2,004 mm (78.9 in)
- Height: 1,696 mm (66.8 in)
- Kerb weight: 2,055–2,260 kg (4,530–4,982 lb)

The third-generation X6 was unveiled on 3 July 2019 and sports more aggressive bodywork including a more angular grille which can be illuminated as an option for the first time on a BMW. An M50i performance model is also new, replacing the xDrive50i model. The headlights mirror those on the X5, but the bumper designs and taillights are unique to the X6. Inside, a panoramic roof is standard, and 83 percent larger than the previous X6's. Sales began in November 2019. The X6 M (F96) and X6 M Competition performance models were revealed on 1 October 2019.

=== Development and launch ===
The G06 X6 is based on the CLAR platform and features a double wishbone front suspension and five-link rear suspension. Compared to its predecessor, it is 26 mm (1.0 in) longer, 15 mm (0.6 in) wider, and 6 mm (0.2 in) lower. The boot capacity is 580 litres (20 cu ft) and 1,530 litres (54 cu ft) litres with the 40:20:40 split seats lowered. All G06 X6 models adhere to the Euro 6d-Temp emissions standard.

At the 2019 Frankfurt Motor Show BMW unveiled a G06 with Vantablack paint. However BMW does not plan on producing the color on production models.

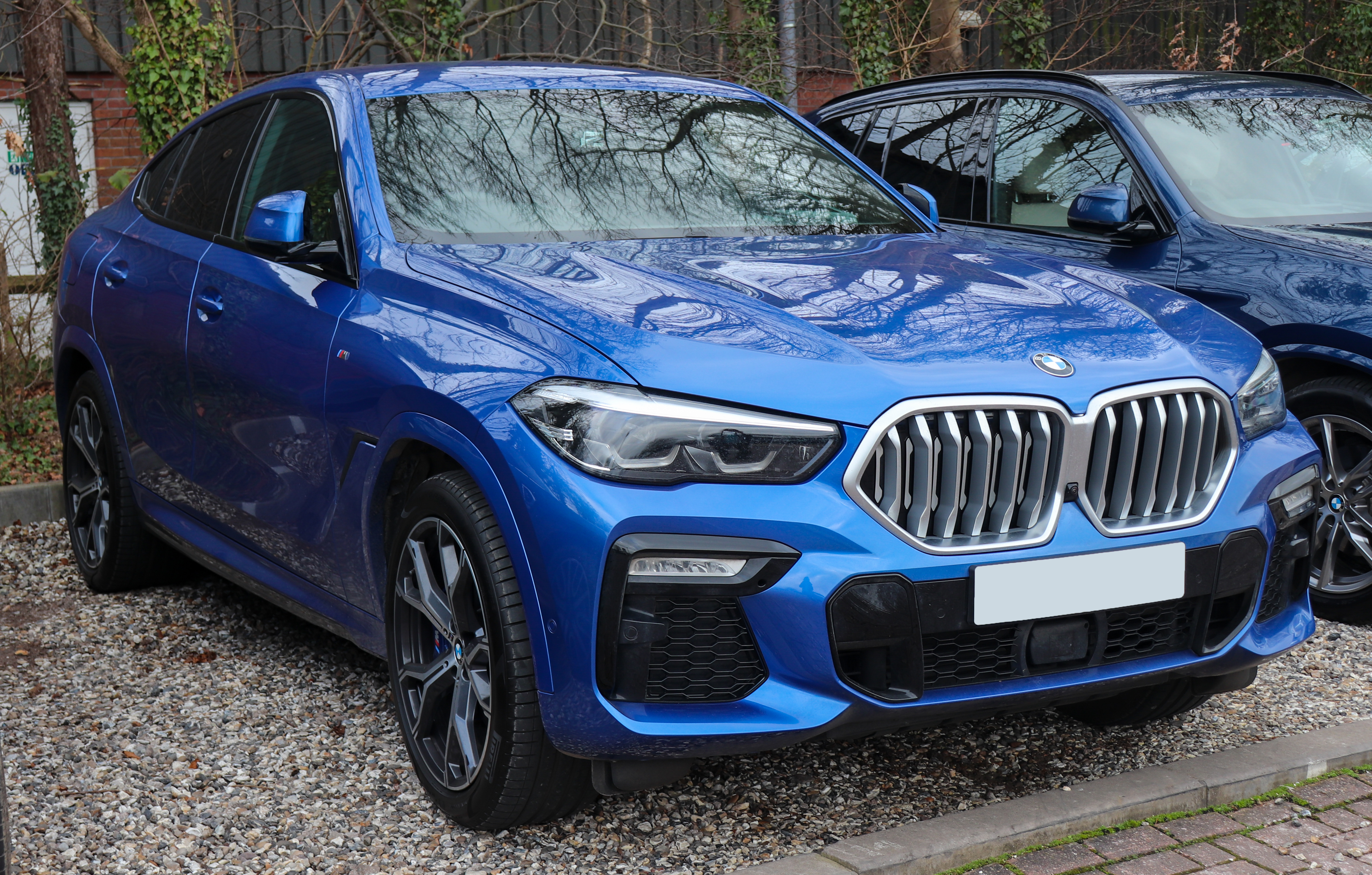
2020 BMW X6 xDrive30d M Sport (codenamed xDrive35D in Japan)

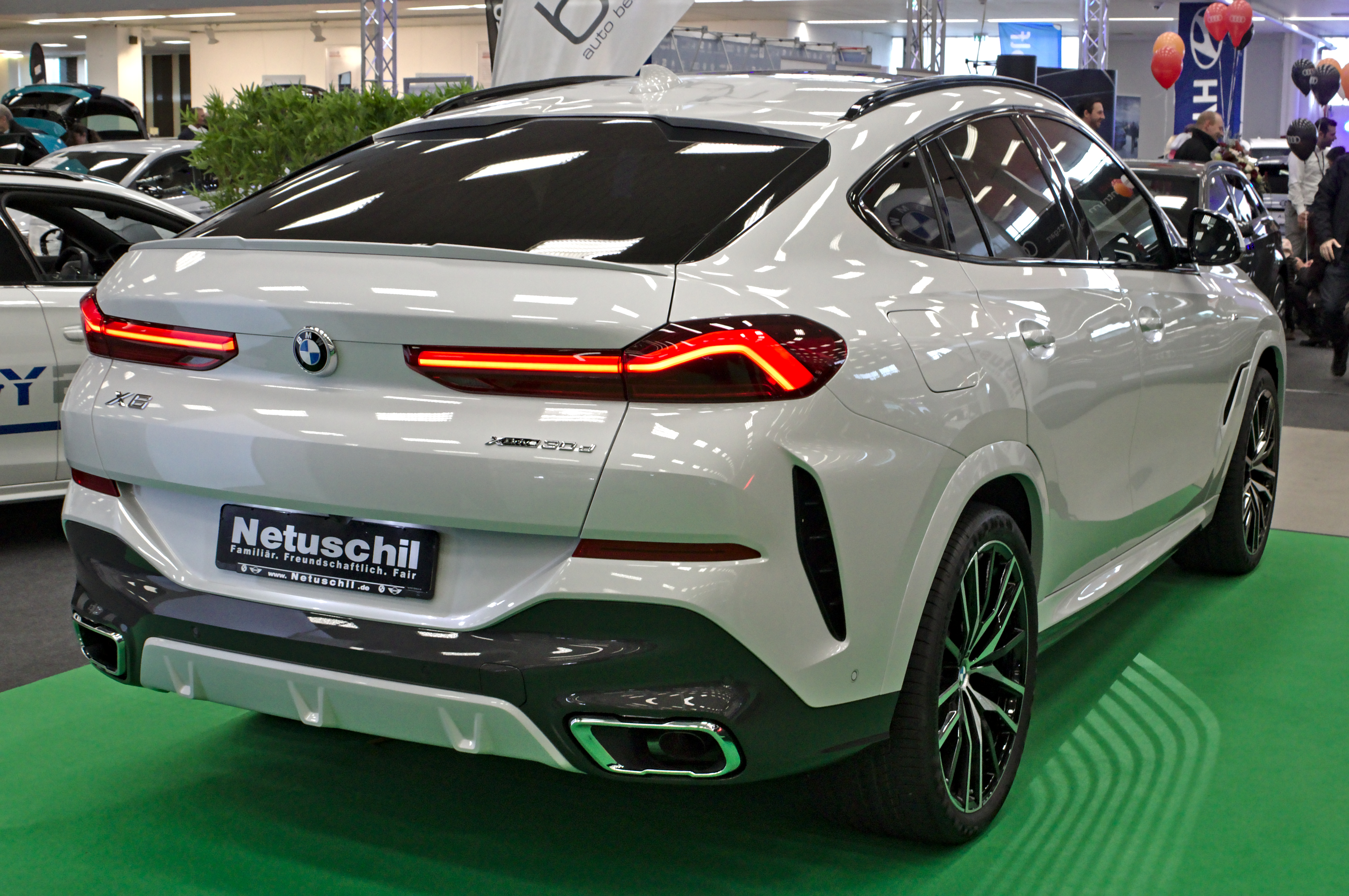
2020 BMW X6 xDrive30d M Sport (codenamed xDrive35D in Japan)

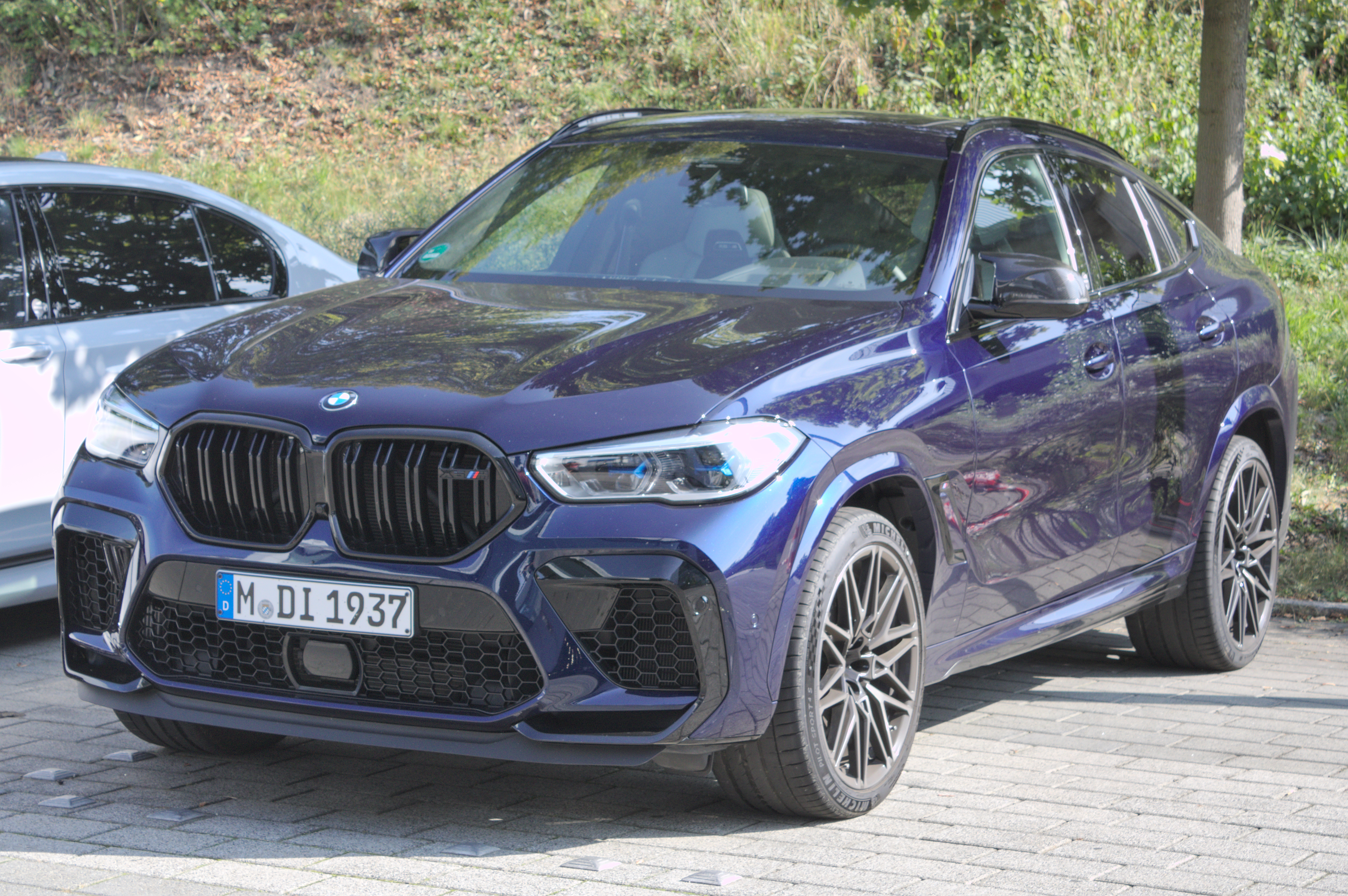
BMW X6 M (F96)

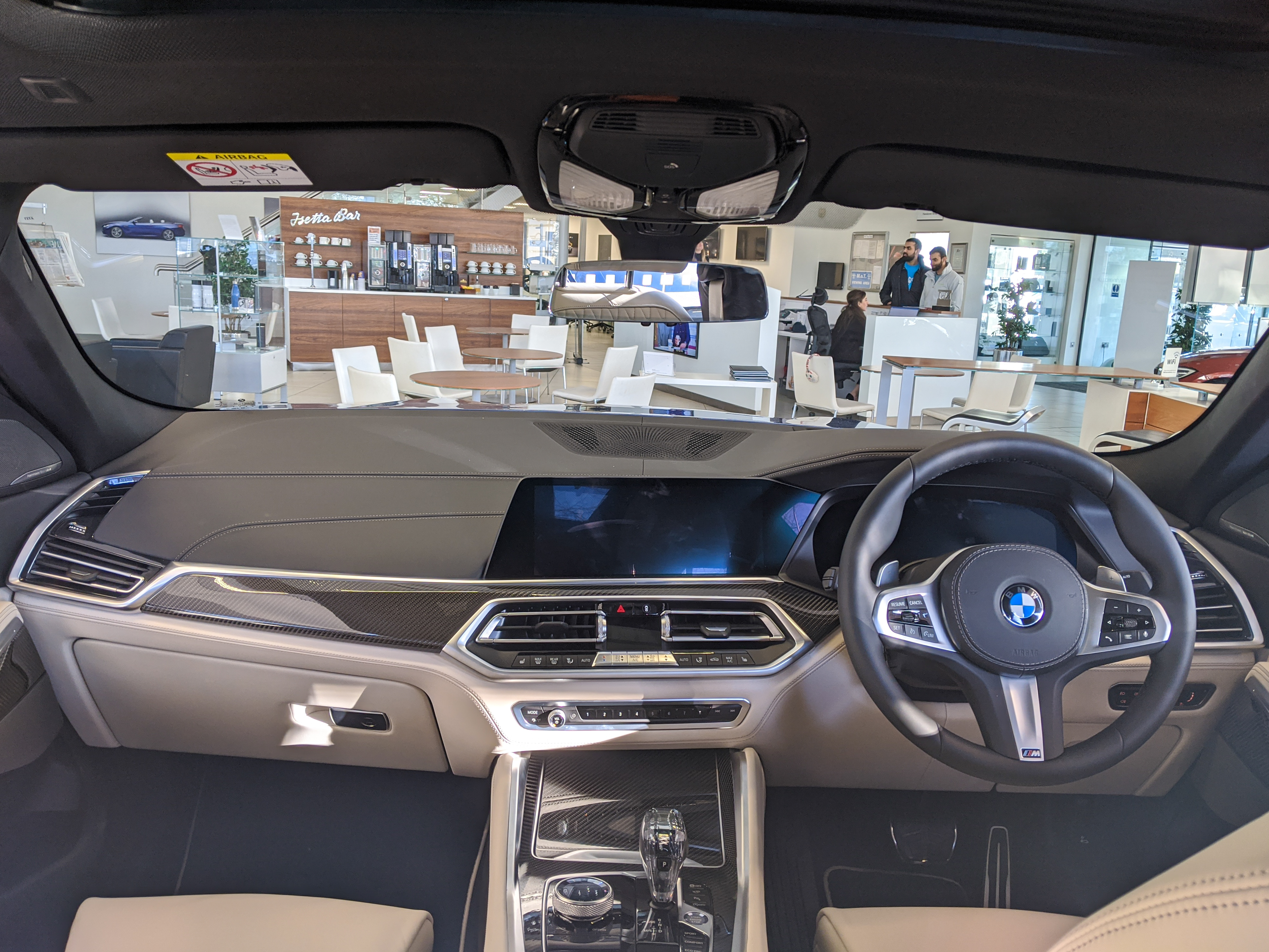
Interior (pre-facelift)

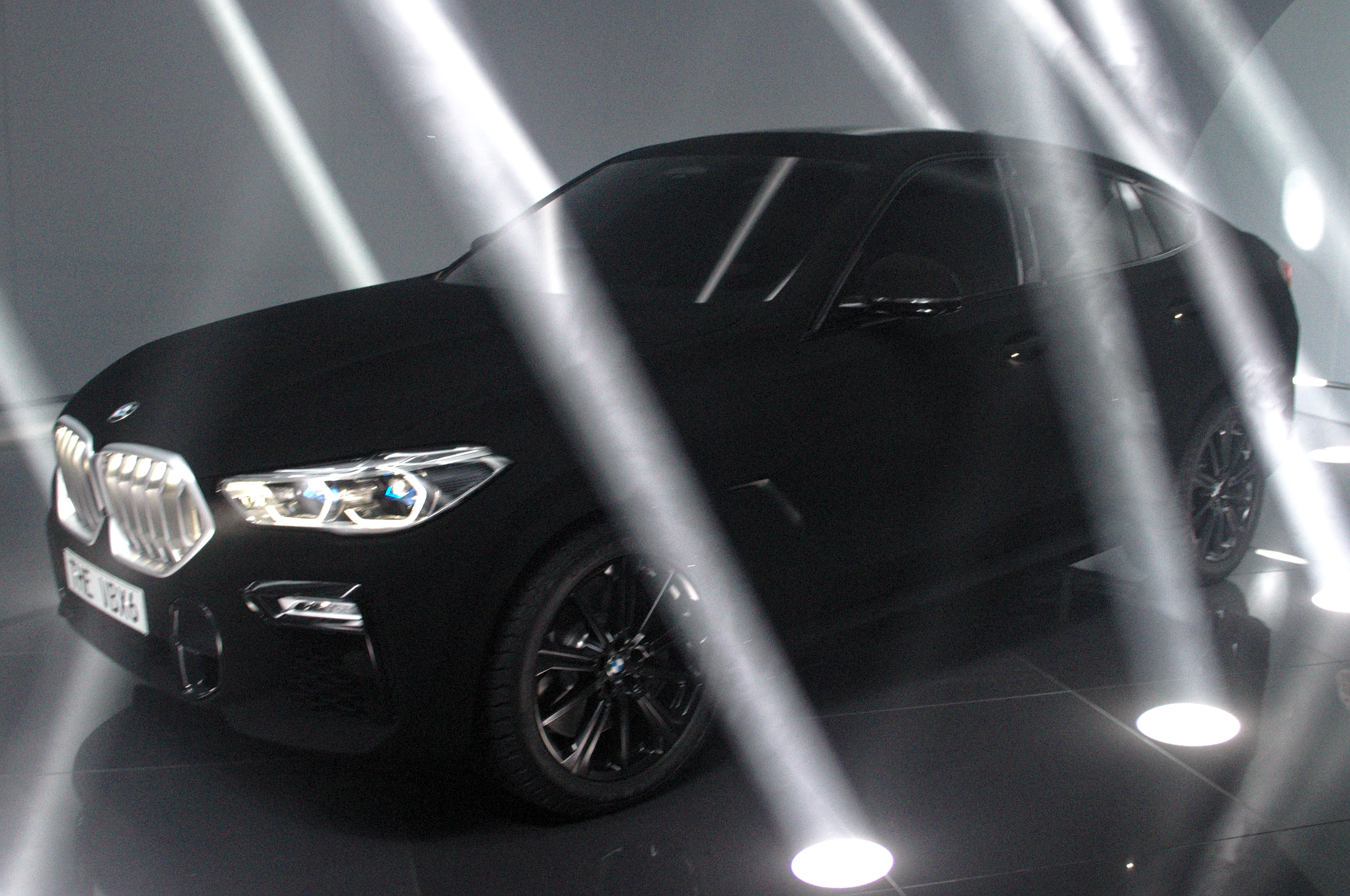
BMW X6 Vantablack

=== 2024 X6 LCI (Life Cycle Impulse) ===
The new X6 has a revised front grille and bumper, new headlights, revised taillights, new exterior colours, new alloy wheel designs, a new BMW Curved Display, a toggle switch is used for the automatic transmission instead of a gear selector, new options packages, new driving assistance features and updates to the engine line-up. The new X6 also receives Highway Assistant, also seen in the G70 7 Series and the facelifted G05 X5.

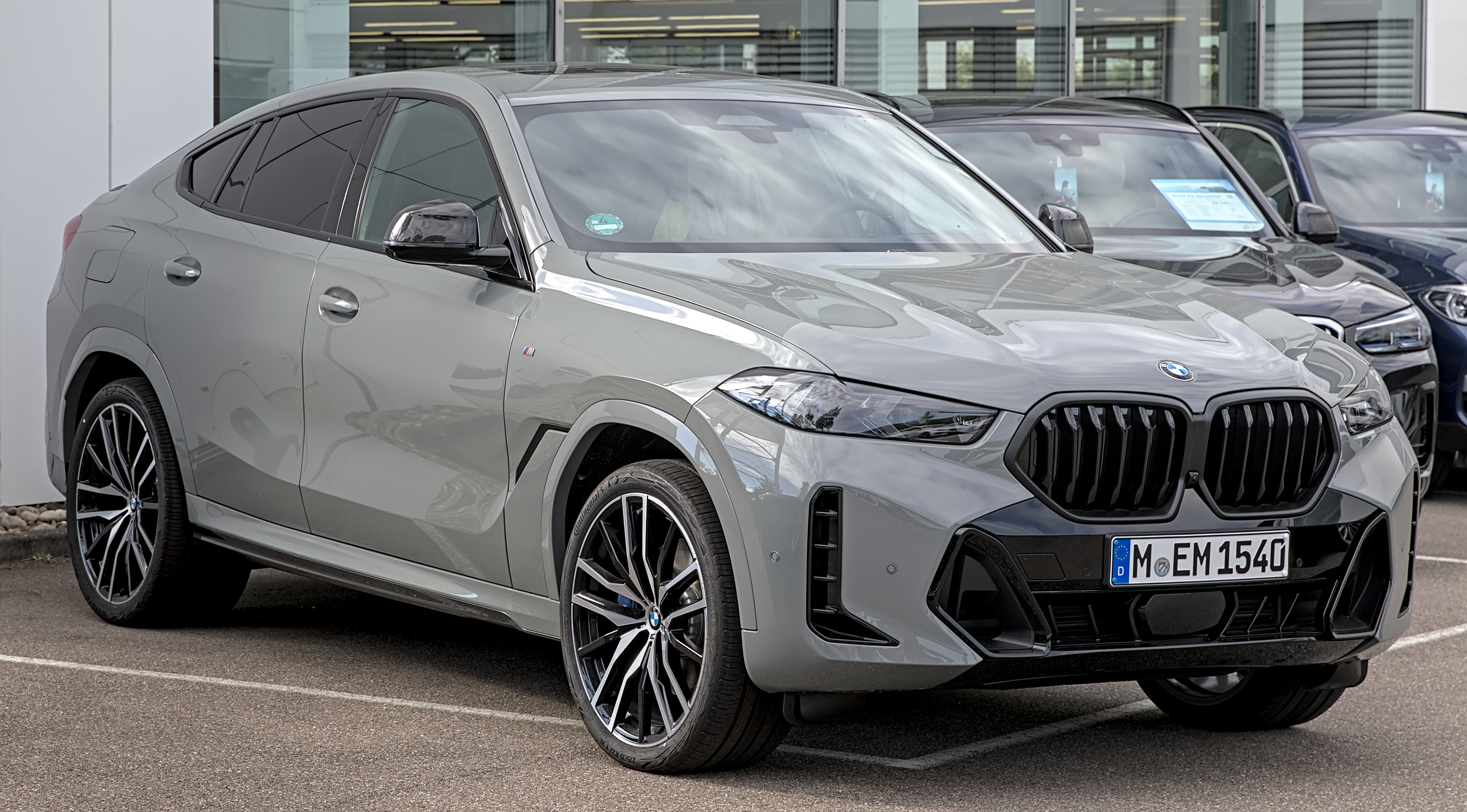
2024 BMW X6 xDrive30d

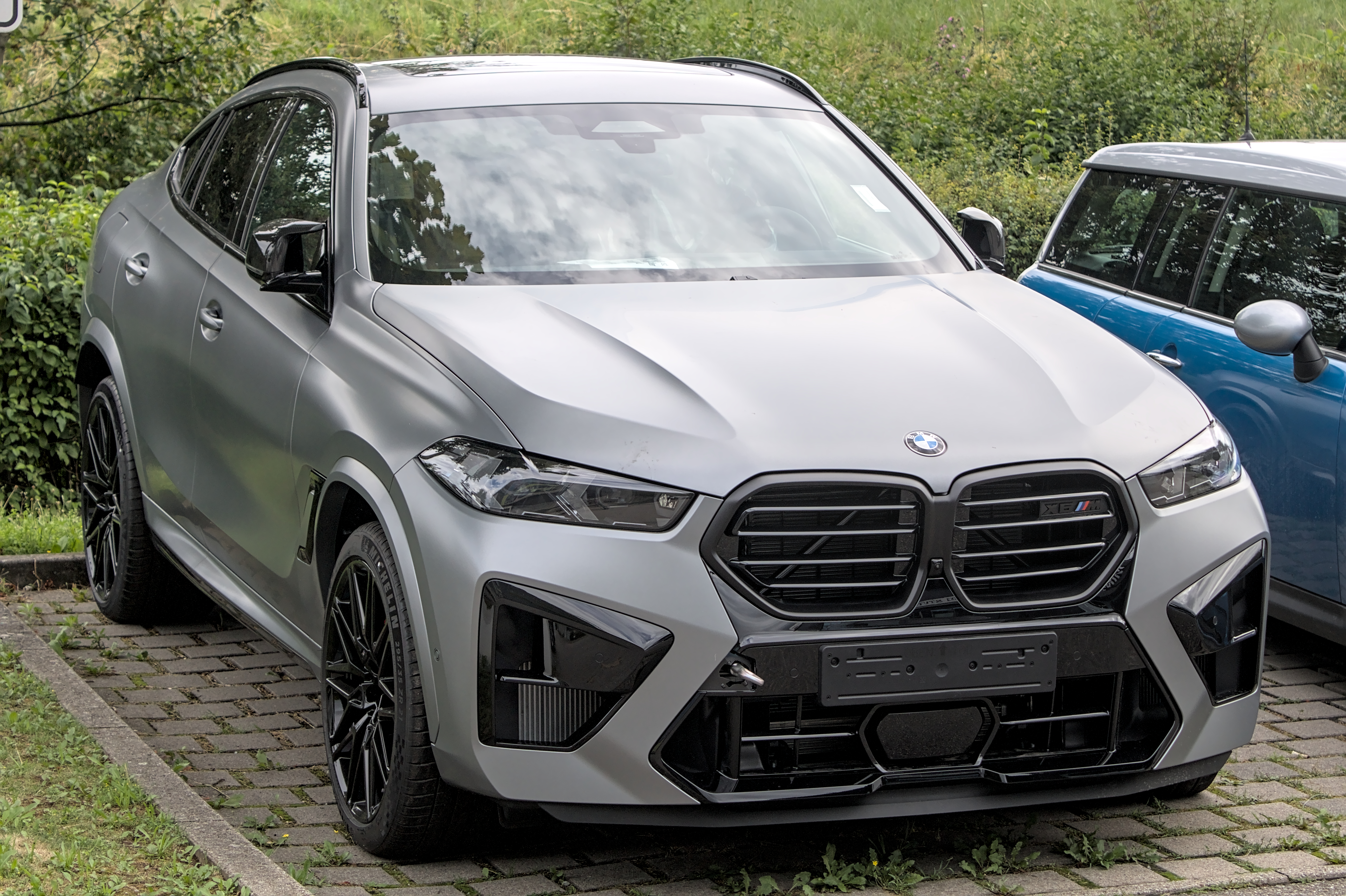
2024 BMW X6 M

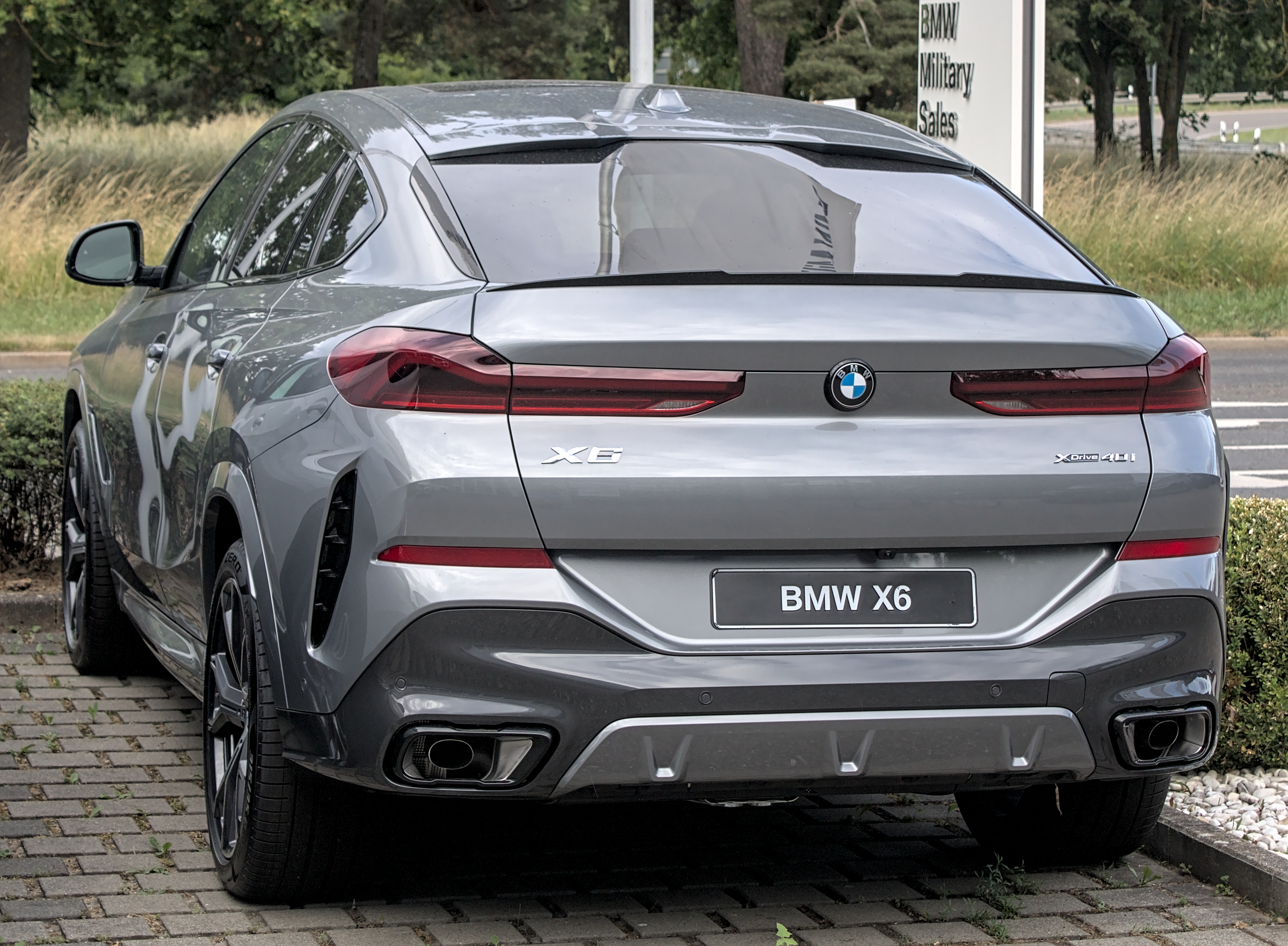
2024 BMW X6 xDrive40I

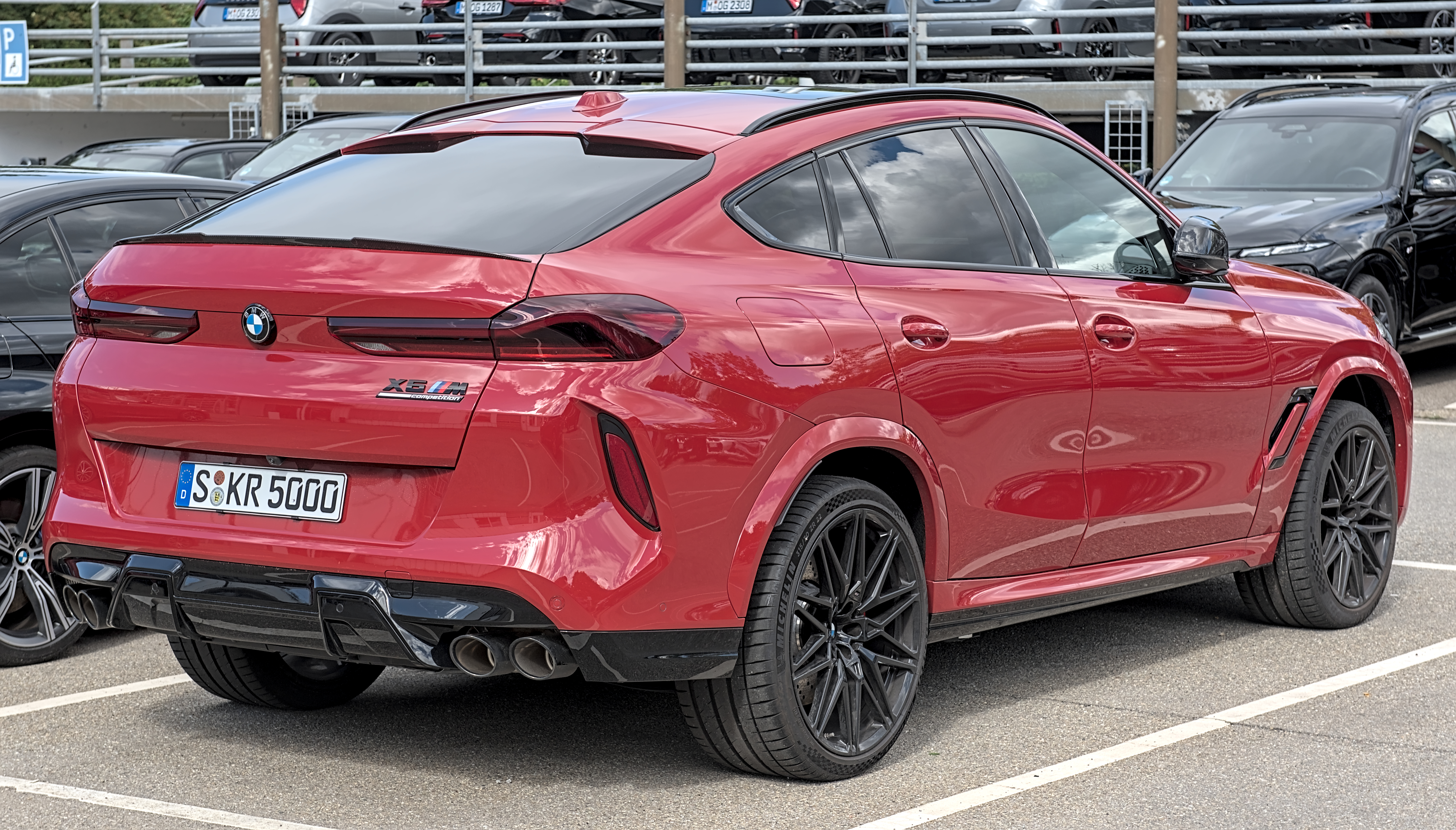
Rear view (X6 M)

In June 2026, BMW re-introduced the X6 coupe-SUV to the Indian market via the CBU route in a single, top-spec M60i xDrive variant, powered by a 530 hp 4.4-litre twin-turbo V8 engine and priced at ₹1.78 crore (ex-showroom).

=== Awards ===
In January 2021, the X6 xDrive30d M Sport was named Coupé SUV of the Year by What Car? magazine. What Car? awarded the X6 four stars out of five in its review of the car.

=== Equipment ===
In the initial release, the G06 X6 was available in xLine or M Sport trim. xLine models featured 19-inch wheels, chrome trim, and underbody protection. M Sport models featured gloss black trim, M Sport styling, M Sport Suspension, and M Sport brakes. M50i and M50d models also featured an M Sport exhaust and an electronically controlled limited slip differential. All models featured LED headlights, welcome light carpet, and iDrive 7.0 with two 12.3-inch displays and the BMW personal digital assistant.

Optional equipment included indicators, laser headlights, an illuminated kidney grille, heated and cooled cupholders, and air suspension which can be raised or lowered by 80 mm (3.1 in) and can be configured with snow, sand, gravel, or rock terrain modes. The G06 X6 could also be optioned with Reverse Assistant, which memorises the last 50 meters travelled and can automatically reverse in that path.

30-40 models with the M Sport trim and M50 Models could be fitted with M Performance Parts. These included a carbon fibre spoiler, M rims, a sport steering wheel, a carbon fibre kidney grille, carbon fibre mirrors and carbon fibre side skirts.

Full M specific M Performance Parts could be fitted to all X6 M models. These included carbon fibre kidney grilles, a carbon fibre diffuser, a carbon fibre spoiler and a sport steering wheel.

The updated G06 X6 became available in March 2023. M Sport trim became standard equipment. Exterior changes included revised grille, headlights, and taillights. The new BMW Curved Display with BMW Operating System 8 was introduced in the interior. New engines were introduced in xDrive30d, xDrive40i, and M60i models. The X6 M (non-Competition) model was dropped.

In 2020, a mild hybrid option was added to the xDrive40d diesel engine.

=== Petrol engines ===
Model	Years	Engine	Power	Torque	0–100 km/h (0–62 mph)
X6 xDrive40i	2019–2023	3.0 L B58 straight-6 turbo	250 kW (335 hp) at 5,500–6,500 rpm	450 N⋅m (332 lb⋅ft) at 1,500–5,200 rpm	5.5 s
X6 xDrive40i	2023–	3.0 L B58 straight-6 turbo	280 kW (375 hp) at 5,200–6,250 rpm	540 N⋅m (398 lb⋅ft) at 1,850–5,000 rpm	5.4 s
X6 M50i	2019–2023	4.4 L N63; V8 twin-turbo	390 kW (523 hp) at 5,500–6,000 rpm	750 N⋅m (553 lb⋅ft) at 1,800–4,600 rpm	4.3 s
X6 M60i	2023–	4.4 L S68 MHEV V8 twin-turbo	390 kW (523 hp) at 5,500–6,000 rpm	750 N⋅m (553 lb⋅ft) at 1,800–4,600 rpm	4.3 s
X6 M	2020–2023	4.4 L S63; V8 twin-turbo	441 kW (591 hp) at 6,000 rpm	750 N⋅m (553 lb⋅ft) at 1,800–4,600 rpm	3.9 s
X6 M Competition	2020–2023	4.4 L S63; V8 twin-turbo	460 kW (617 hp) at 6,000 rpm	750 N⋅m (553 lb⋅ft) at 1,800–4,600 rpm	3.8 s
X6 M Competition	2024–	4.4 L S68 MHEV; V8 twin-turbo	460 kW (617 hp) at 6,000 rpm	750 N⋅m (553 lb⋅ft) at 1,800–4,600 rpm	3.9 s

=== Diesel engines ===
Model	Years	Engine	Power	Torque	0–100 km/h (0–62 mph)
X6 xDrive30d (same specs in Japan as xDrive35D)	2019–2023	3.0 L B57 straight-6 turbo	195 kW (261 hp) at 4,000 rpm	620 N⋅m (457 lb⋅ft) at 2,000–2,500 rpm	6.5 s
X6 xDrive30d (same specs in Japan as xDrive35D)	2023–	3.0 L B57 straight-6 turbo	219 kW (294 hp)	670 N⋅m (494 lb⋅ft)	6.1 s
X6 xDrive40d	2019–	3.0 L B57 straight-6 twin-turbo	250 kW (335 hp) at 4,400 rpm	680 N⋅m (502 lb⋅ft) at 1,750–2,250 rpm	5.6 s
X6 M50d	2019–2020	3.0 L B57 straight-6 quad-turbo	294 kW (394 hp) at 4,400 rpm	760 N⋅m (561 lb⋅ft) at 2,000–3,000 rpm	5.2 s

=== Production ===
In March 2025, Avtotor resumed assembly of the X5, X6, and X7 models using remaining component kits left over after BMW terminated its partnership with the company in 2022 following Russia's invasion of Ukraine. BMW stated that it was not involved in the production, explaining that Avtotor was assembling limited batches of vehicles from "old, partially outdated kits" that had remained in its possession after the partnership ended, with production taking place on an irregular basis.

Avtotor sold a total of 145 vehicles in 2025. Although these vehicles were registered as 2025 and 2026 model-year vehicles, they retained the exterior design of the pre-facelift 2022 models. As supplies of imported components diminished, assembly increasingly incorporated locally sourced parts, including wiring harnesses, hoses, rubber components, and painted body panels.

== Production and sales ==
Year	Production	Sales		
Year	Production	Europe	U.S.	China
2008	26,580	13,212	4,548	
2009	41,667	19,805	4,787	
2010	46,404	17,162	6,257	
2011	40,822	14,876	6,192	
2012	43,689	12,943	6,749	
2013	36,688	8,597	5,549	
2014	30,244	4,936	3,896	
2015	46,305	14,158	7,906	
2016	43,323	12,596	7,117	
2017	40,531	10,492	6,780	
2018	35,040	9,445	6,862	
2019	22,116	4,951	4,240	
2020	38,100	10,460	7,313	
2021				
2022			13,676	
2023			10,077	4,913
2024			9,481	3,500
2025			12,000	2,041

== See also ==
- List of BMW vehicles
