= Salon de l'Auto =

Salon de l'Auto may refer to:

- The old name of the Mondial de l'Automobile (the Paris Motor Show, name changed in 1988)
- Salon International de l'Auto, the Geneva Motor Show
- Montreal International Auto Show or Le Salon International de l'auto de Montréal
