= Felino Corporation =

- Type: Private
- Industry: Automotive
- Founded: 2009; 17 years ago in Montreal, Canada
- Founder: Antoine Bessette
- Products: Felino CB7
- Website: felinocars.com

Felino is a Canadian automobile manufacturer specializing in racing cars and supercars.

== History ==
The company was founded in 2009 by former racing driver Antoine Bessette in Montreal, Quebec, Canada. The first vehicle produced was the Felino CB7, designed between 2010 and 2014, and tested at the Formula One Gilles Villeneuve Circuit. In 2012, the first prototypes were shown at the Montreal International Auto Show, and commercial production began in 2015.
