= Felino CB7 =

FELINO cB7
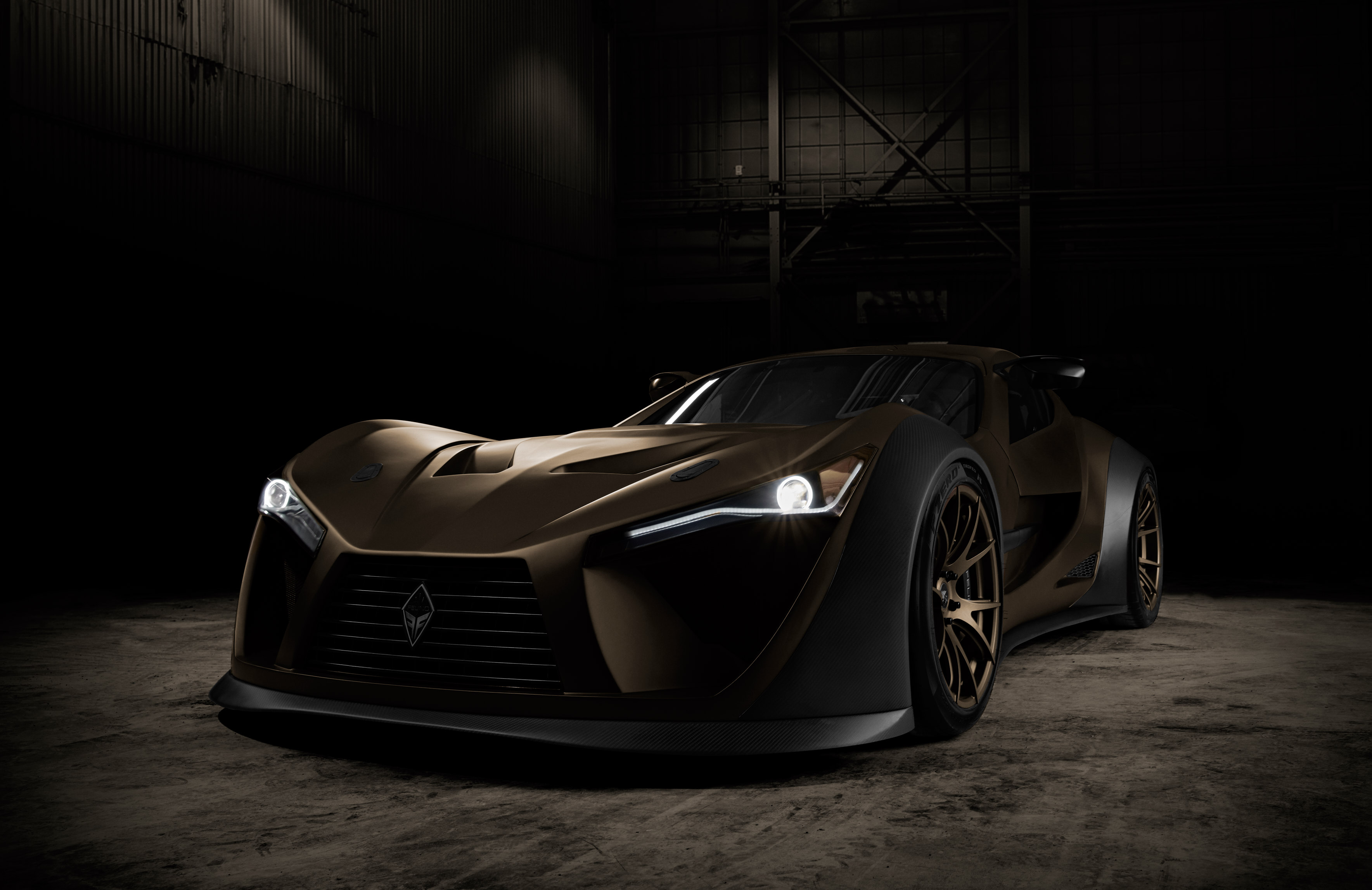

Overview
- Manufacturer: Felino Corporation
- Production: 2016–present
- Designer: Antoine Bessette

Body and chassis
- Class: Sports car (S)
- Body style: 2-door coupe
- Layout: FMR layout
- Doors: Butterfly doors

Powertrain
- Engine: 7.0 L LS7 V8
- Transmission: 6-speed manual; 6-speed sequential

Dimensions
- Wheelbase: 2,451 mm (96 in)
- Length: 4,191 mm (165 in)
- Width: 1,930 mm (76 in)
- Height: 1,143 mm (45 in)
- Curb weight: 1,170 kg (2,579 lb)

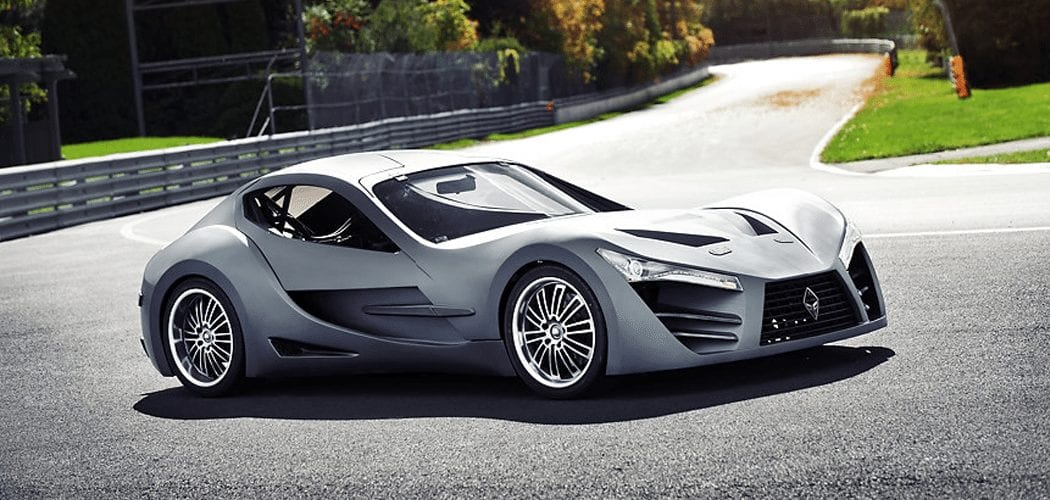
cB7, sideview

The Felino cB7 (stylized FELINO cB7) is a Canadian sports car produced by automotive company Felino Cars. The car was in development for a total of seven years before its official production in 2016.

== cB7 ==
The vehicle was unveiled in the 2014 Montreal International Auto Show.

Prices start around US$275,000.

=== Development ===
Before its production start, the car was in development for seven years. The car was designed by Canadian racing driver Antoine Bessette.

The car started with a design blueprint to confirm its design. A year later in 2009, the car's main frame was built, which had a lightweight tubular frame, and was wrapped with composite and carbon fiber elements. The first cB7 prototype was being built in 2010, and was completed in 2011. Testing was being done in the Circuit Gilles Villeneuve track. A second prototype was built, with a larger engine and body. In 2014, an unveiling of the prototype was made in the Montreal International Auto Show. This was the same year the development of the car was in near completion. The car was officially sold in 2016.

=== Specifications ===
The car uses one of three optional 7.0-liter naturally-aspirated cast aluminum V8 engines. The first boasts 430 hp (321 kW; 436 PS) and 425 lb⋅ft (576 N⋅m), the second puts out 525 hp (391 kW; 532 PS) and 489 lb⋅ft (663 N⋅m), and the third option produces 610 hp (455 kW; 618 PS) and 604 lb⋅ft (819 N⋅m). The car's top speed and performance figures are dependent on the option. The engine compression ratio is 10.7:1 and the bore and stroke is 103.25 x 92mm. This power is delivered by either a 6-speed manual transmission or a 6-speed sequential paddle-shift transmission. The body uses composites and carbon fiber. The car's tire sizes are 245/40R18 up front and 315/30R18 in the rear. These tires shoe the aluminum alloy standard wheels. The brakes are regular steel discs, which are 355 mm (14 in) both front and rear but are 6-piston up front and 4-piston in the rear. These brake discs have optional carbon fiber.

=== Design ===
The exterior is a long nose kind of layout, with a design that slightly resembles that of lightweight track cars. The car has the inclusion of LED lighting. The car's carbon fiber diffuser gives the car more aggression. The interior design shows the lightweight track design much more boldly, with the inclusion of exposed carbon fiber and racing components. It still keeps a road car design with some leather installations.

=== Media ===
The cB7 has been featured in three games: Asphalt 8, Asphalt Nitro, Speed Racing Ultimate.

== cB7R ==
It is a limited (10 units) version of cB7 designed for road use, with increased engine powers to 525 hp (391 kW; 532 PS) and 486 lb⋅ft (659 N⋅m) for 6.2L V8 engine, or 700 hp (522 kW; 710 PS) and 580 lb⋅ft (786 N⋅m) for 7.0L engine version.

The vehicle was unveiled in the 2020 Canadian International AutoShow.

== cB7+ ==
Claimed to be lighter and more powerful, the cB7+ was unveiled in 2021 and produced in limited numbers.
