= BMW Concept 7 Series ActiveHybrid =

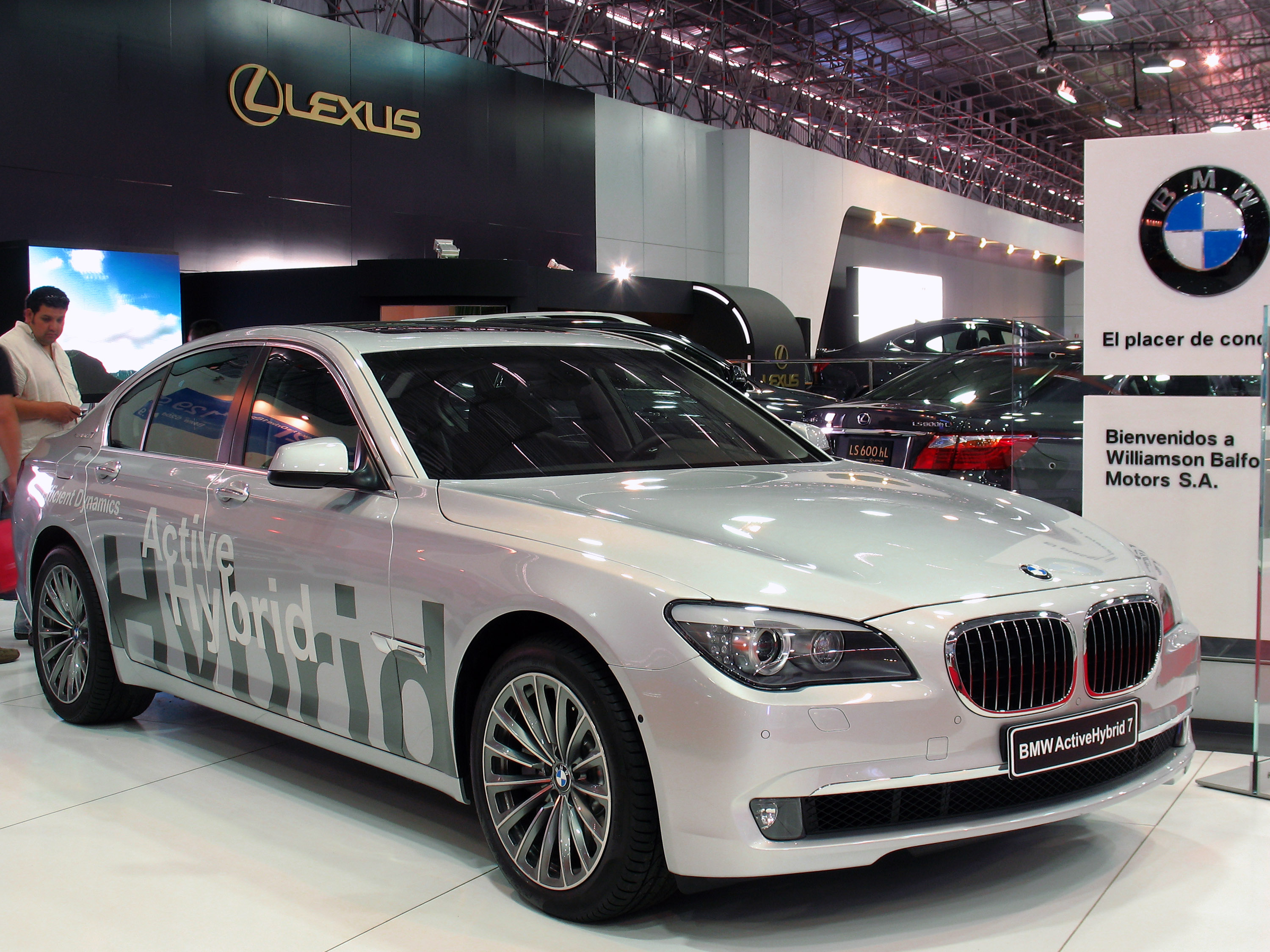

Overview
- Manufacturer: BMW

Body and chassis
- Class: Large premium car
- Body style: 4-door saloon

Powertrain
- Engine: 4.4 L N63 twin-turbo V8
- Electric motor: 3-phase synchronous electric motor
- Transmission: 8-speed ZF 8HP automatic
- Hybrid drivetrain: MHEV

The BMW Concept 7 Series ActiveHybrid is a concept car developed by BMW and presented at the Paris Motor Show in October 2008. It is BMW's first mild hybrid and second hybrid concept vehicle after the BMW Concept X6 ActiveHybrid, BMWs first full hybrid revealed at the 2007 Frankfurt Motor Show. Both models will be ready for mass production at the end of 2009.

== Specifications ==
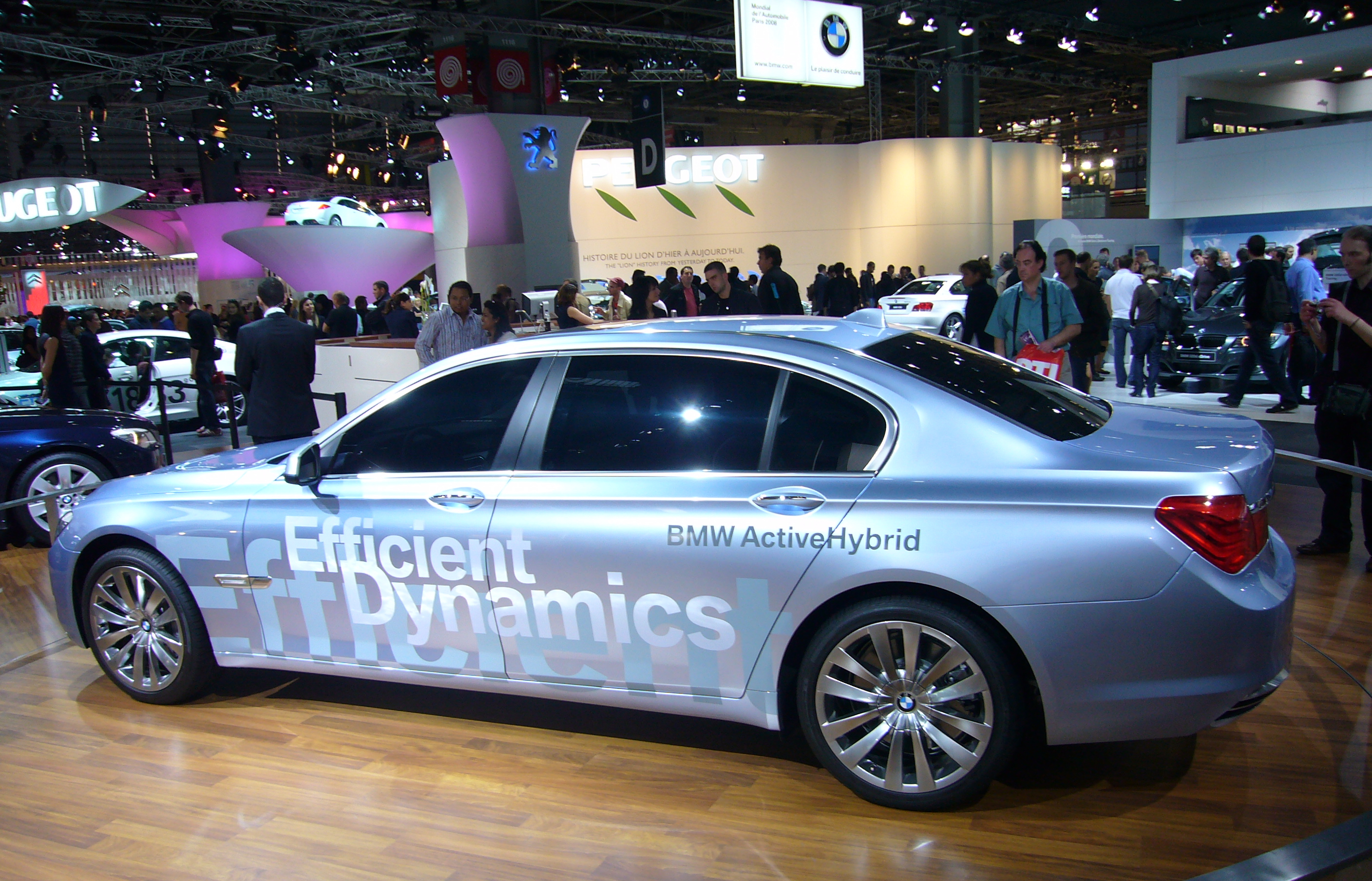
Rear view

The BMW Concept 7 Series ActiveHybrid combines an engine based on the High Precision Injection V8 Twin Turbo unit used in the BMW 750i (where it delivers 300 kW/407 hp) with an electric motor that is only designed to provide support to the internal combustion engine. The electric motor is integrated between transmission and engine and provides 15 kW of power and 210 Nm of torque. In this so-called mild hybrid configuration, the electric motor increases the potential of the eight-cylinder petrol engine while using Brake Energy Regeneration – mostly in urban traffic – to reduce fuel consumption and CO_{2} emissions.

== Production ==
In August 2009 BMW announced the production version of the BMW ActiveHybrid 7 (F04), together with BMW ActiveHybrid X6. The BMW ActiveHybrid 7 features a 0.4 kWh lithium-ion battery pack.

== See also ==
- BMW 7 Series
- BMW ActiveHybrid 3
- BMW ActiveHybrid 5
- BMW ActiveHybrid X6
- BMW ActiveHybrid 7
