= Felino Exercise =

FELINO exercise is part of the series of joint military exercises and combination, developed in the military-technical cooperation with the Community of Portuguese Language Countries, are intended to enable interoperability of the Armed Forces of the CPLP member states and training for employment of these peace operations and humanitarian assistance, under the aegis of the United Nations, respecting the laws.

== Past chronology ==
2000 - Portugal hosts Felino in the region of Lamego from 17 to 27 October as an FTX (Field Training Exercise). Participants included Angola, Cape Verde, Guinea-Bissau, Mozambique, São Tomé and Príncipe, and Portugal. Brazil participated as observer.

2001 - Portugal again hosts the exercises in the Lamebo region as an FTX.

2002 - Brazil hosts the exercise at Caatinga, in Brazil's northeast region as an FTX. Participants included Angola, Cape Verde, Guinea-Bissau, Mozambique, São Tomé and Príncipe, and Portugal. East Timor was invited to send observers.

2003 - In Mozambique from 24 to 28 November as a CPX (Command Post Exercise). Militaries from the eight CPLP countries are included.

2004 - Angola hosts as an FTX. The objective is to develop the exchange of knowledge, in terms of planning, organization and execution to facilitate the employment of forces in combined and joint operations.

2005 - Cape Verde hosts as CPX. In this exercise Cape Verde's Center for Exercise Simulation participated and introduced the geographic reference program ("programa de referenciação geográfica").

2006 - Brazil hosts as FTX. Participating countries show interest in themes connected to "new missions."

2007 - São Tomé e Príncipe as CPX.

2008 - Portugal returns to host as an FTX.

2009 - Mozambique hosts as CPX.

2010 - In Angola as FTX. Rescheduled to 19–28 March 2011 for technical reasons. All member states are present.
