= Montreal International Auto Show =

Annual automobile showcase

Coordinates: 45°30′16″N 73°33′36″W

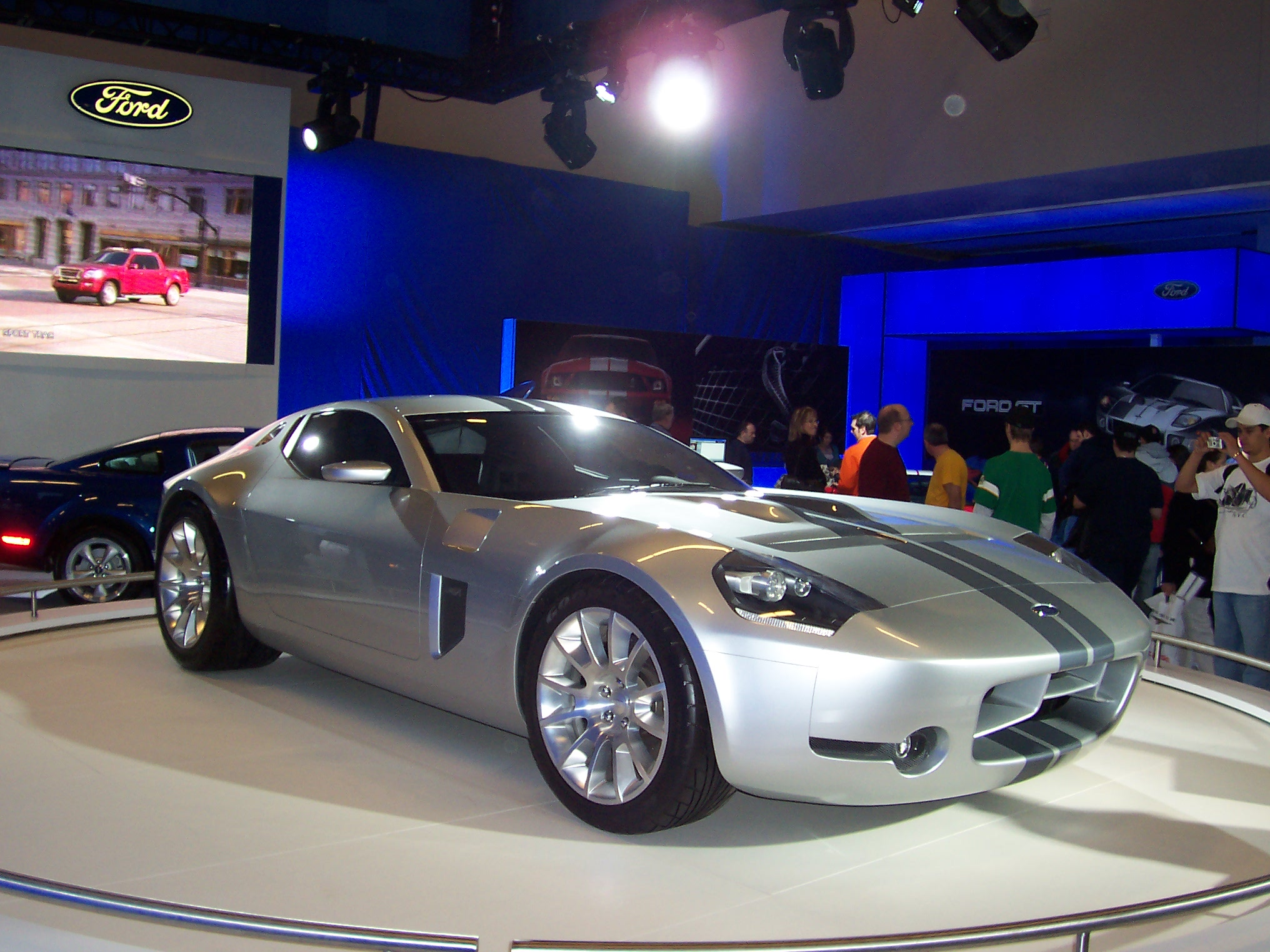
A Ford Shelby GR-1 from the 2007 show.

The Montreal International Auto Show (French: Le Salon International de l'Auto de Montréal) is an annual auto show held for 10 days in mid-to-late January in Montreal, Quebec, Canada. It usually takes place at the Palais des congrès de Montréal.

The Montréal International Auto Show (MIAS) is produced by the Montréal Automobile Dealers Corporation. When it was first launched in 1969, the show's aim was to beef up car sales during a time of the year when business was known to be relatively slow for car dealerships. This event is, after all these years, a much-anticipated annual rite among Montréalers and it is one of the most important events of its type in Canada with an average of more than 200,000 visitors. The auto show features over 650 vehicles on 375,000 square feet (34,800 m^{2}).

The 2014 edition of the MIAS was held at Palais de Congrés from January 17 to January 26 inclusively.

== Automakers ==
=== United States (including its Canadian-owned subsidiaries) ===
- General Motors
  - Buick
  - Cadillac
  - Chevrolet
  - GMC
- Chrysler
  - Chrysler
  - Dodge
  - Jeep
  - Ram
- Ford Motor Company
  - Ford
  - Lincoln
- Saleen
- Callaway

=== United Kingdom ===
- Aston Martin
- Bentley (subsidiary of Volkswagen Group)
- Jaguar (subsidiary of Tata Motors)
- Land Rover (subsidiary of Tata Motors)
- Lotus Cars
- Mini (subsidiary of BMW)
- Rolls-Royce

=== Sweden ===
- Volvo (subsidiary of Geely)

=== Italy ===
- Fiat
  - Fiat
  - Ferrari
  - Maserati
- Lamborghini (subsidiary of Volkswagen Group)

=== Germany ===
- Volkswagen Group
  - Audi
  - Volkswagen
- BMW
- DaimlerBenz
  - Maybach
  - Mercedes-Benz
  - Smart

=== South Korea ===
- Hyundai Kia Automotive Group
  - Hyundai
  - Kia

=== Japan ===
- Honda Motor Company
  - Acura
  - Honda
- Nissan Motors
  - Infiniti
  - Nissan
- Toyota Motor Corporation
  - Lexus
  - Toyota
- Mazda
- Mitsubishi
- Subaru

=== Vietnam ===
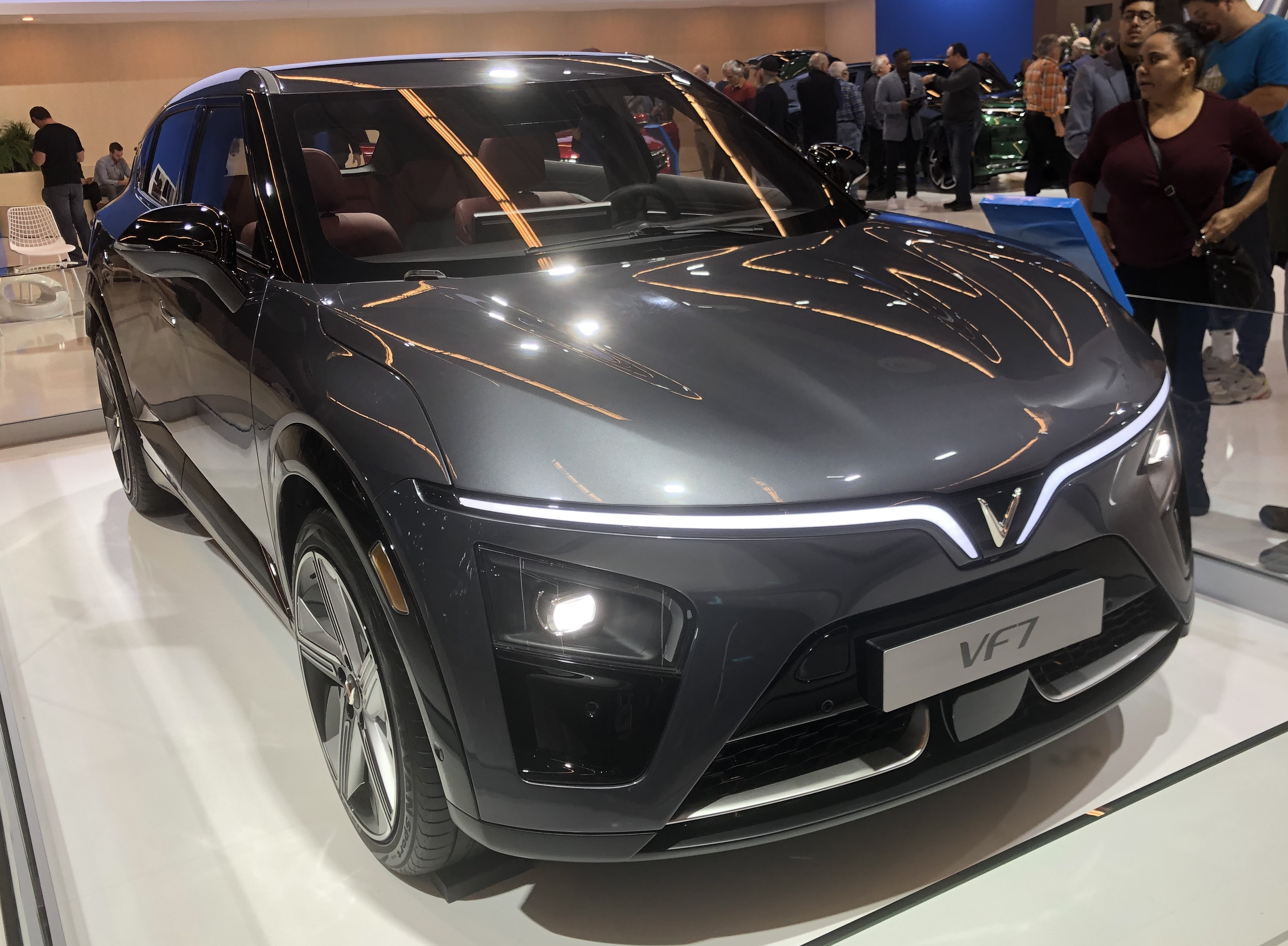
VF 7

- VinFast
