= BMW M =

High-performance luxury car manufacturer owned by BMW

BMW M GmbH
- Current logo introduced in March 2020
- Formerly: BMW Motorsport GmbH (1972–1993)
- Type: Subsidiary (GmbH)
- Industry: Automotive
- Founded: 1972
- Headquarters: Munich, Germany
- Key people: Franciscus "Frank" Van Meel (CEO)
- Products: Internal combustion engines and cars Automotive sports accessories
- Services: High Performance Driver Education, automobile tuning
- Parent: BMW AG
- Website: www.bmw-m.com

BMW M GmbH, formerly known as BMW Motorsport GmbH, is a subsidiary of the German automobile BMW AG that manufactures high-performance luxury cars.

BMW M ("M" for "motorsport") was initially created to facilitate BMW's racing program, which was very successful in the 1960s and 1970s. As time passed, BMW M began to supplement BMW's vehicle portfolio with specially modified higher trim models, for which they are now most known by the general public. These M-badged cars traditionally include modified engines, transmissions, suspensions, interior trims, aerodynamics, and exterior modifications to set them apart from their counterparts. All M models are tested and tuned at BMW's private facility at the Nürburgring racing circuit in Germany.

BMW M also provides M packages for the BMW S1000RR motorcycle, with a limited-production homologation-special, race-type machine designated M1000RR, produced from 2021 onwards.

== History ==
=== Origins ===
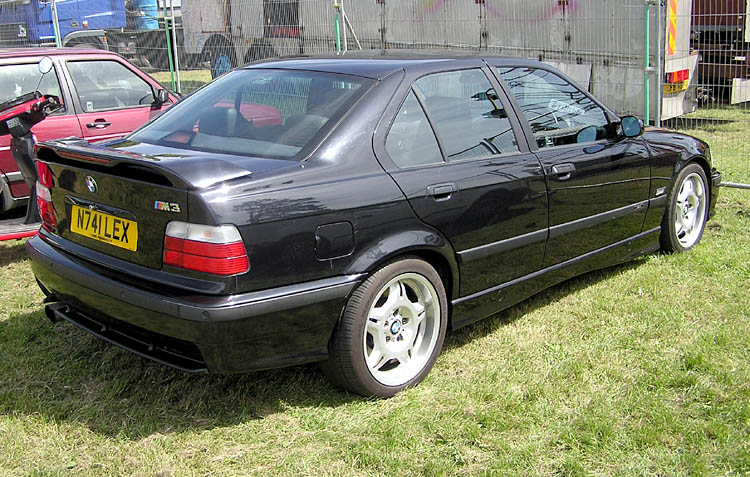
BMW E36 M3 in England

Established in May 1972 with 35 employees, it grew to 400 employees by 1988, and is currently an integral part of BMW's market presence. The first racing project was BMW's 3.0 CSL. After this came the BMW 530MLE in 1976. It was designed to compete in South Africa's Modified Production Series instead of the regular E12 528i. 100 homologated road cars had to be produced for this.

After the success of BMW M products like BMW 3.0 CSL in racing venues and the growing market for high performance sports cars, M introduced cars for sale to the public. The first official M-badged car for sale to the public was the M1, revealed at the Paris Motor Show in 1978. The M1, however, was more of a racecar in domestic trim than an everyday driver. The direction of the M cars changed with the 1979 release of the M535i, which was a high performance version of BMW's popular 5 Series mid-size sedan.

In 1993, BMW Motorsport GmbH changed their name to BMW M GmbH. BMW Motorsport GmbH supplied the 6.1-litre V12 DOHC 48 valve engine that powers the McLaren F1, which, like its engine supplier and manufacturer, has enjoyed plenty of racing success, famously winning the 24 Hours of Le Mans in 1995, the first year of competition for the GTR racing variant.

=== Recent history ===
At present, BMW M has offered modified versions of nearly every BMW nameplate, except for the Z1. The BMW X5 and X6 sport activity vehicles received M derivatives for the 2010 model year onwards. These are the first M vehicles with xDrive four-wheel drive and automatic transmissions, and also the first M-badged SUV models. However, the E70 and E71 X5 and X6 M were actually developed by BMW Group rather than by BMW M.

Although these are considered the most well known in-house tuning divisions, BMW M has a considerably different philosophy than Mercedes-AMG. BMW M has emphasized tuning only vehicles with "Lateral agility" (which has long been the 3 Series, 5 Series, and roadsters), while AMG has created fast versions of many of its nameplates, including flagship sedans and SUVs. Accordingly, "an M car has to be responsive and fundamentally keen on turning as well as accelerating. The M5's technical spec is all about connecting the driver to a car that reacts blindingly fast, whatever request the driver hands down." Until the 2010 model year, BMW M has also never used supercharging or turbocharging, unlike Mercedes-AMG or Audi; for instance the E39 and E60 iterations of the BMW M5 (using naturally-aspirated engines) competed against the Mercedes-Benz E55 AMG (with a supercharged V8) and the Audi RS6 (twin-turbo).

BMW M vehicles can use a variety of transmissions, including manual, dual-clutch, and automatic transmissions. The North American market E36 M3s in sedan and convertible form were the first M-vehicles offered with a traditional torque-converter automatic transmission.

BMW M engines were traditionally large displacement naturally aspirated high revving engines, particularly the S85 V10 in the E60 M5 and E63 M6 and the related S65 V8 in the E90 M3. These are the most powerful engines BMW has ever built (not including the BMW S70/2) without supercharging or turbocharging, with an output of 100 hp per liter of displacement, and each has won numerous International Engine of the Year Awards. As late as the early 2000s, BMW regarded forced-induction (supercharging or turbocharging) as low-tech shortcuts to boosting horsepower, stating that this adds weight and complexity while reducing throttle response. BMW purists have noted that while forced induction and/or large displacement does produce more torque for better day-to-day driving, most of them like the "character" and sound of low displacement naturally aspirated engines with high redlines.

However, the late 2000s international regulations trends on reducing CO_{2} emissions and fuel consumption are cited as the reasons not to continue further development on naturally aspirated high redline engines. The N54 twin-turbo inline-6 which debuted in the 2007 BMW 335i (E90) gives almost equivalent performance to the E46 and E90 iterations of the BMW M3, while being much more practical and fuel-efficient as a daily driver. Starting with the X5 M and X6 M, and featured in the F10 M5, BMW used the twin-turbocharged S63 which not only produces more horsepower and torque, but is also more efficient than the S85 V10. Also unlike the S85 and S65 which do not share a design with non-M BMW engines, the S63 has significant parts commonality with the base N63 V8 engine (which is also has twin turbochargers) making them less expensive to build. BMW has not yet considered supercharging.

The BMW M3 (E92/E93) was the last "traditional" M car left, as the rest of the list features turbocharged engines. The next iteration of the M3 (F80) and M4 (F82/F83) features a twin-turbocharged straight-6 engine.

BMW X2 (F39) 2018-2023.

This sports activity coupe (SAC) has a unique logo on the rear pillar, it pays homage to the BMW 3.0 CSL 1972, first car built by the M Sports team.

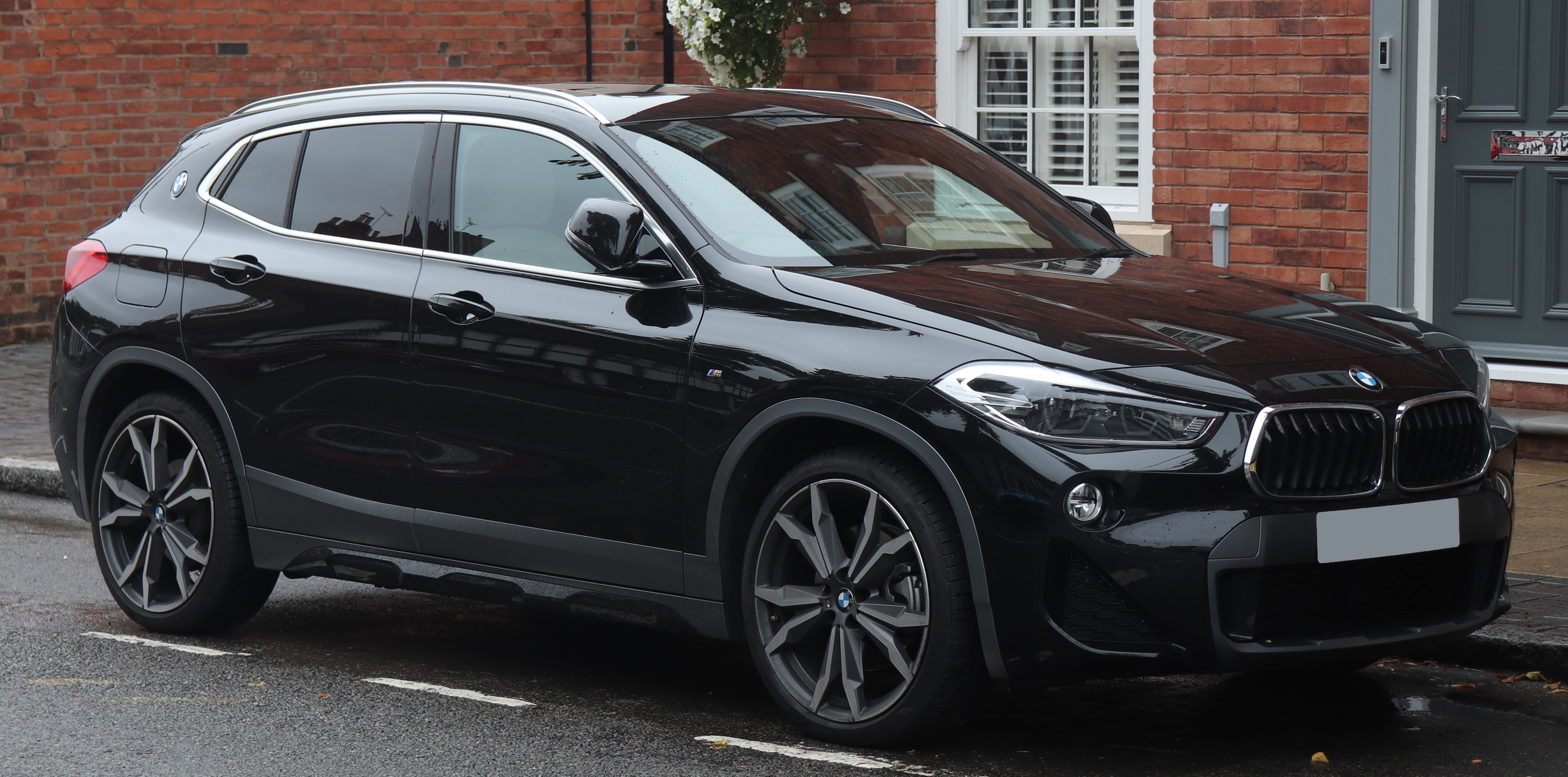

== Leadership ==
- Jochen Neerpasch (1972–1980)
- Dieter Stappert (1980–1993)
- Adolf Prommersberger (1994–2003)
- Ulrich Bruhnke (2003–2007)
- Ludwig Willisch (2008–2009)
- Kay Segler (2009–2011)
- Friedrich Nitschke (2011–2014)
- Franciscus van Meel (2015–2018)
- Markus Flasch (2018–2021)
- Franciscus van Meel (2021–present)

== M cars versus M-badged cars ==
Apart from the pinnacle M versions of each model, BMW Motorsport also offers "M Sport" accessories upgrades to cars in its lineup. This single purchase option, which offers more dramatic enhancements from the standard Sports Package, includes a sportier suspension, steering wheel, gearshift, wheels, fully-adjustable sport seats, and a sports aerodynamic package. Cars with the "M Sport" option are sportier than their respective stock models, but trade some of the performance and handling of M cars in exchange for greater comfort.

Vehicles with the "M Sport" upgrade feature smaller M badges on the wheels, front fenders, steering wheel, gearshift and door sills, whilst fully-fledged M cars have larger "M" badges on the grille and/or trunk, wheels, steering wheel, gearshift and door sills with the model number (e.g., "M4" or "M5"). The exceptions include the M Roadster and M Coupe models, both Z3, Z4 and 1 Series variants, which only have an "M" badge with no number displayed on the boot.

BMW has offered these 'M Sport' options on their standard vehicles since the late 1970s which explains why these vehicles carry M badges straight from the factory. In comparison, vehicle maker Audi also employs this same type of nomenclature. There are fully fledged 'S' models (S4, S5, S6, S7 and TTS), as well as an optional 'S'-line package that can be equipped to their standard vehicle lineup. An example of 'M'-badged vehicles in recent times includes the 5 Series and 6 Series only having a choice of either a manual or automatic transmission, but the 'M' Sport package had an optional Sequential Sport Gearbox (SSG) (a gearbox similar to the M5 and M6 (SMG)) until after the 2007 model year.

=== Exclusive M cars ===
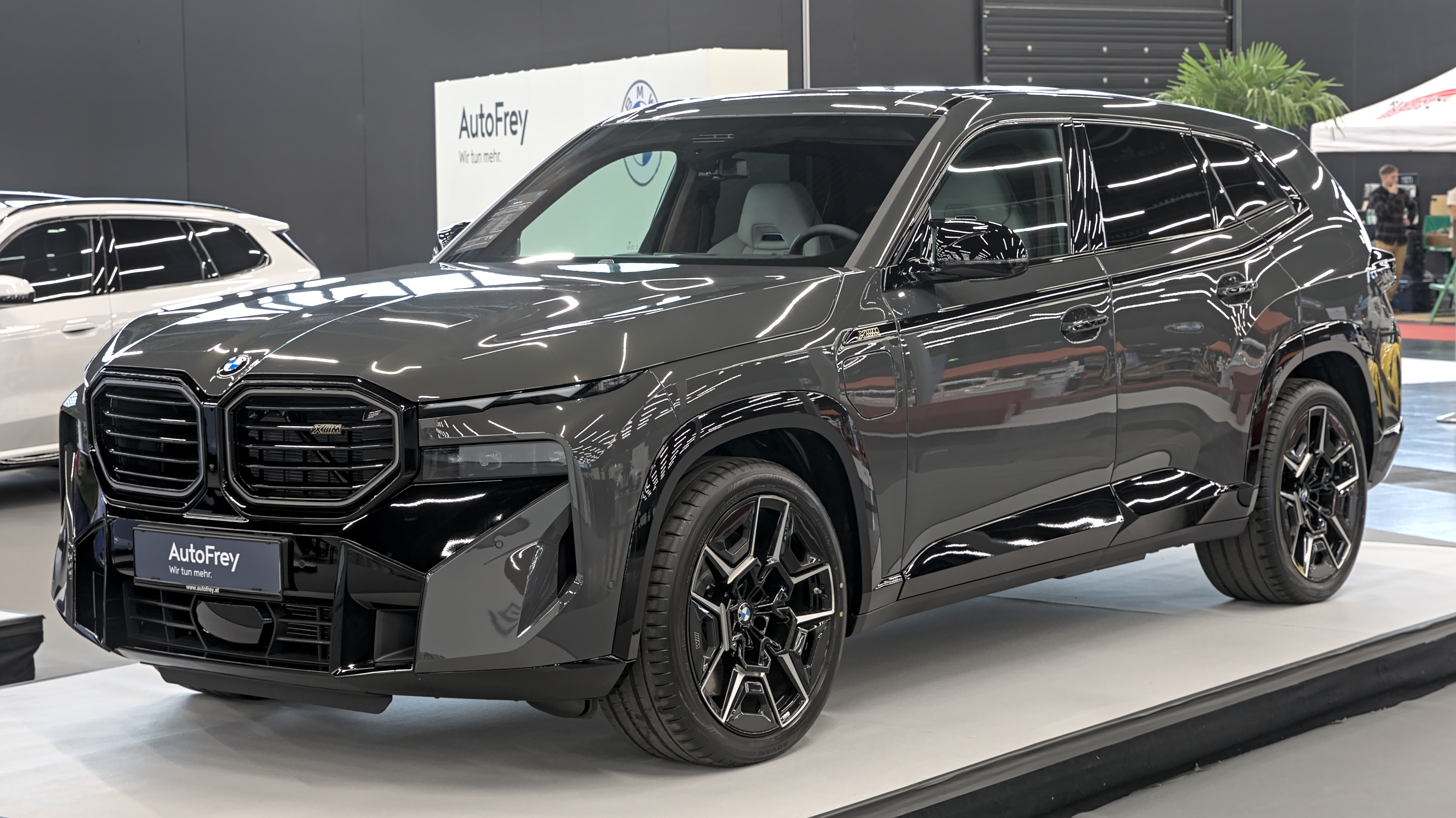
BMW XM

Two models, the M1 (1978–1981) and XM (2022–present), are not pinnacle versions of an existing BMW model, but rather, are ground-up performance models produced and sold exclusively in their M variant. Sometimes labelled as "M Original" cars, these models represent flagship performance and design for the M brand.

== M Performance models ==
In 2012 BMW introduced a new category for M cars, branded as M Performance, designed “to bridge the gap between M Sport variants and the outright M high-performance models.“ The lineup included the diesel-powered M550d in saloon and touring body styles, X5 M50d, and X6 M50d, marking the first diesel-powered BMW models to ever carry M-badging. The gasoline-powered M135i debuted shortly after.

BMW has since announced M Performance variants of nearly every model in their lineup, including four electric models, the i4, i5, iX and the i7.

=== Exceptions ===
- The BMW X-based M vehicles bear their normal model designations followed by the "M" stripe badge (the X3 M, X4 M, X5 M and X6 M). If the nomenclature followed tradition, then they would have had the "M" preceding the model designation, e.g. MX5 and MX6, already used by Mazda.
- The Z3-based M Roadster and M Coupe bore numberless "M" badges as standard fitment.
- The first generation Z4-based Z4 M Roadster and Z4 M Coupe bore their normal model designations followed by the "M" stripe badge (the Z4 M Roadster and Z4 M Coupe).
- The BMW M635CSi followed the M535i naming tradition but was a fully-fledged M-Car (the M6).
- The BMW 1 Series-based M cars is called the BMW 1 Series M Coupe to avoid confusion with the original BMW M1.

== List of cars ==
=== Current M cars ===
- M2 – G87 coupé (2023–)
- M3 – G80 saloon, G81 estate (2021–)
- M4 – G82 coupé, G83 convertible (2021–)
- M5 – G90 saloon, G99 estate (2024–)
- X5 M – F95 (2020–)
- X6 M – F96 (2020–)
- XM – G09 (2022–)

=== Current M Performance models ===
- i4 M50 xDrive - G26 BEV gran coupé (2021–)
- i5 M60 xDrive - G60 saloon and G61 estate (2024–)
- i7 M70 xDrive - G70 saloon (2023–)
- iX M60 (2022–)
- M135 xDrive – F70 five-door hatchback (2024–)
- M235 xDrive – F74 gran coupé (2024–)
- M240i/M240i xDrive - G42 coupé (2021–)
- M340i xDrive and M340d xDrive - G20 saloon and G21 estate (2019–)
- M440i xDrive and M440d xDrive - G22 coupé and G23 convertible (2020–)
- M760e xDrive - G70 saloon (2023–)
- X1 M35i xDrive - U11 (2023-)
- X2 M35i xDrive - U10 (2023–)
- X3 M50 xDrive - G45 (2024–)
- X5 M60i xDrive - G05 (2023–)
- X6 M60i xDrive - G06 (2023–)
- X7 M60i xDrive - G07 (2023–)

=== Previous M cars ===
| Production | Model | Type | Displacement | Engine Type | Power | Body | Production Number | Image |
|---|---|---|---|---|---|---|---|---|
| 1978–1981 | M1 | E26 | 3.5-litre | I6 | 204 kW (277 PS) | Coupe | 453 | |
| 1980–1984 | M535i | E12 | 3.5-litre | I6 | 160 kW (220 PS) | Sedan with 4 doors | 1,410 | |
| 1984-1989 | M 635 CSi | E24 | 3.5-litre | I6 | 191 kW (260 PS) to 210 kW (290 PS) | Coupe | 5,859 | |
| 1985-1988 | M535i | E28 | 3.5-litre | I6 | 136 kW (185 PS) to 160 kW (220 PS) | Sedan with 4 doors | 9,483 | |
| 1985-1988 | M5 | E28 | 3.5-litre | I6 | 210 kW (290 PS) | Sedan with 4 doors | 2,191 | |
| 1986-1991 | M3 | E30 | 2.3-litre 2.5-litre | I4 | 143 kW (194 PS) to 175 kW (238 PS) | Coupe; Convertible | 17,184 (Coupe); 786 (Convertible) | |
| 1988-1995 | M5 | E34 | 3.6-litre 3.8-litre | I6 | 232 kW (315 PS) to 250 kW (340 PS) | Sedan with 4 doors Station wagon (since 1992) | 11,336 (Sedan); 891 (Station wagon) | |
| 1990 | M8 | E31 | 6.0-litre | V12 | 410 kW (558 PS) | Coupe | 1 prototype | |
| 1992-1999 | M3 | E36 | 3.0-litre 3.2-litre | I6 | 179 kW (243 PS) to 236 kW (321 PS) | Sedan with 4 doors Coupe; Convertible | 71,242 | |
| 1996-2002 | M Roadster; M Coupe | E36/7; E36/8 | 3.2-litre | I6 | 179 kW (243 PS) to 236 kW (321 PS) | Roadster; Coupe | 6,291 (Coupe); 15,375 (Roadster) | |
| 1998-2003 | M5 | E39 | 5.0-litre | V8 | 294 kW (400 PS) | Sedan with 4 doors | 20,482 | |
| 2000-2006 | M3 | E46 | 3.2-litre 4.0-litre (GTR) | I6; V8 | 252 kW (343 PS) to 279 kW (379 PS) | Coupe; Convertible | 85,744 | |
| 2005-2010 | M5 | E60; E61 | 5.0-litre | V10 | 373 kW (507 PS) | Sedan with 4 doors Station wagon (since 2007) | 19,522 (Sedan); 1,025 (Station wagon) | |
| 2005-2010 | M6 | E63; E64 | 5.0-litre | V10 | 373 kW (507 PS) | Coupe; Convertible (since 2006) | 9,087 (Coupe); 5,065 (Convertible) | |
| 2006-2008 | Z4 M Roadster; Z4 M Coupé | E85; E86 | 3.2-litre | I6 | 252 kW (343 PS) | Roadster; Coupe | 4,275 (Coupé); 5,070 (Roadster) | |
| 2007-2013 | M3 | E90; E92; E93 | 4.0-litre 4.4-litre (CRT & GTS) | V8 | 309 kW (420 PS); 331 kW (450 PS) | Sedan with 4 doors Coupe; Convertible | 9,606 + 68 M3 CRT (Sedan); 39,954 + 138 M3 GTS (Coupé); 16,219 (Convertible) | |
| 2011-2012 | 1M Coupe | E82 | 3.0-litre | I6 | 250 kW (340 PS) | Coupe | 6,342 | |
| 2009-2013 | X5 M | E70 | 4.4-litre | V8 | 408 kW (555 PS) | SAV | 8,974 | |
| 2009-2014 | X6 M | E71 | 4.4-litre | V8 | 408 kW (555 PS) | SAV | 10,678 | |
| 2011-2016 | M5 | F10 | 4.4-litre | V8 | 412 kW (560 PS) to 441 kW (600 PS) | Sedan with 4 doors | 19,533 | |
| 2012-2018 | M6 | F06/F12/F13 | 4.4-litre | V8 | 412 kW (560 PS) to 441 kW (600 PS) | Sedan with 4 doors Coupe; Convertible | 6,719 (Sedan with 4 doors); 4,515 (Coupe); 4,318 (Convertible) | |
| 2013-2018 | X5 M | F85 | 4.4-litre | V8 | 423 kW (575 PS) | SAV | 12,915 | |
| 2014-2019 | X6 M | F86 | 4.4-litre | V8 | 423 kW (575 PS) | SAV | 9,794 | |
| 2014-2018 | M3 | F80 | 3.0-litre | I6 | 317 kW (431 PS) to 338 kW (460 PS) | Sedan with 4 doors | 33,414 + 1,263 M3 CS | |
| 2014-2020 | M4 | F82; F83 | 3.0-litre | I6 | 317 kW (431 PS) to 368 kW (500 PS) | Coupe; Convertible | | |
| 2015-2021 | M2 | F87 | 3.0-litre | I6 | 272 kW (365 hp) to 331 kW (444 hp) | Coupe | 61,856 | |
| 2017-2023 | M5 | F90 | 4.4-litre | V8 | 441 kW (600 PS) to 467 kW (635 PS) | Sedan with 4 doors | | |
| 2019-2025 | M8 | F91/F92/F93 | 4.4-litre | V8 | 412 kW (560 PS) to 441 kW (600 PS) | Gran Coupe; Coupe; Convertible | | |
| 2019-2024 | X3 M | F97 | 3.0-litre | I6 | 353 kW (480 PS) to 375 kW (510 PS) | SAV | | |
| 2019-2025 | X4 M | F98 | 3.0-litre | I6 | 353 kW (480 PS) to 375 kW (510 PS) | SAV | | |

=== M-badged cars ===
All these cars are true BMW Motorsport models, not M-line sport models that bear BMW Motorsport features such as sport body kits, and interior specs.

- E12 M535i (1979–1981) – often considered the first mass-production vehicle built by BMW Motorsport
- E31 850CSi (1992–1996) – an M car in all but name; it had a BMW M–sourced engine and its VIN indicated that it was developed by BMW Motorsport, like all other M cars.

=== M-engined cars ===
In the late 1980s, due to prohibitive taxes for cars above 2.0-litres of engine displacement in Italy and Portugal, BMW decided to build the E30 320is as an alternative to the 2.3-litre M3. This car was equipped with a shorter stroke S14 engine and produced 192 PS. BMW produced a total of 3648 units between 9/1987 and 11/1990 of which a majority of 2542 units were made available in two-door form (code name AK95). No catalytic converters were installed on this limited version. The steering rack, springs, shock absorbers, and brakes were similar to the normal E30 6-cylinder models (i.e. 325i) with sports suspension. The engine was mated to a Getrag 265 5-speed transmission in dog-leg configuration.

== Competition ==
Audi's RS models, Mercedes-Benz's AMG models, and Lexus F models are often reviewed in direct competition to a similarly sized BMW M car, such as the Lexus IS-F vs. Audi RS 4 vs. Mercedes-Benz C 63 AMG vs. BMW M3.

In contrast to aftermarket tuners, Alpina BMW-based cars are currently mostly built by BMW on its production lines and are more comfort-oriented. Alpina is recognized as a car manufacturer and works very closely with BMW, sometimes participating in the development of BMW models and engines. Some Alpina models are even sold in North-America by BMW and either compete with the BMW M6 Gran Coupé, in the case of the Alpina B6 Gran Coupé, or replace them, in the case of the Alpina B7 as there is no M7 variant of the 7 Series to compete with the model.

BMW M also faces competition from several independent companies offering their own performance versions of BMW models; some performance packs can be retrofitted to existing cars while others are applied to new cars bought directly from BMW AG and converted prior to first registration. Such companies include Hamann Motorsport, Dinan Cars, G-Power, AC Schnitzer and Hartge.

== See also ==
- BMW
- BMW in motorsport
- BMW Motorsport
- BMW model designations
- History of BMW
- Audi Sport GmbH
- Audi S and RS models
- Hyundai N
- Mercedes-AMG
