= BMW X5 (E53) =

First generation of the BMW X5

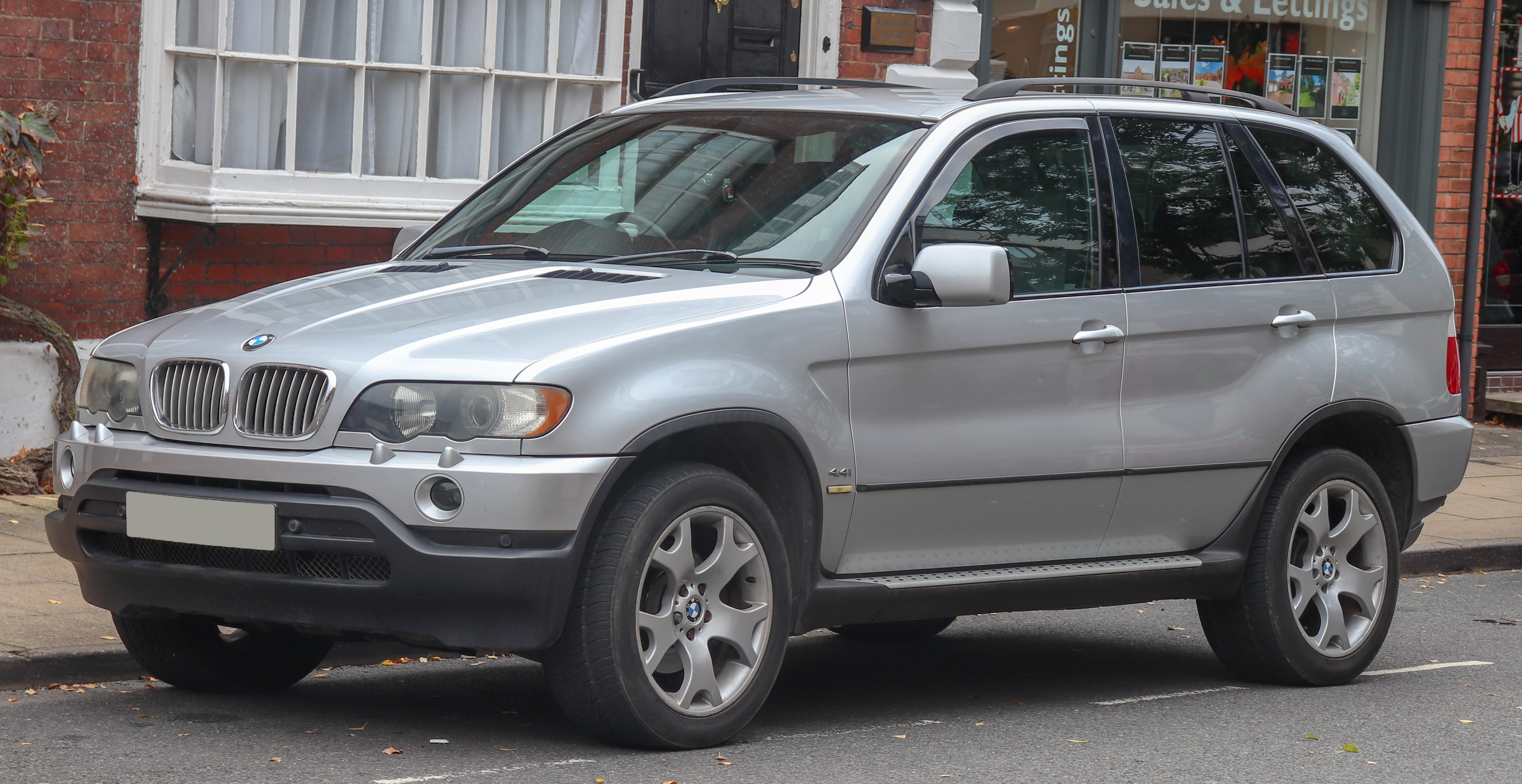

Overview
- Manufacturer: BMW
- Model code: E53
- Production: September 1999 – September 2006 (467,995 produced)
- Model years: 2000–2007
- Assembly: United States: Greer, South Carolina (Plant Spartanburg); Mexico: Toluca (BMW Mexico)
- Designer: Peter Gabath (1995); Chris Bangle (1996, LCI: 2002); Wolfgang Reitzle (1996); Frank Stephenson (1996); Henrik Fisker

Body and chassis
- Class: Mid-size luxury crossover SUV
- Layout: Front-engine, all-wheel-drive
- Related: BMW 5 Series (E39); Range Rover (L322)

Powertrain
- Engine: Gasoline: 3.0 L M54 I6; 4.4 L-4.6 L M62 V8; 4.4 L-4.8 L N62 V8; Diesel: 2.9–3.0 L M57 I6 turbo
- Transmission: 5-speed manual (ZF S5D 280Z); 6-speed manual (ZF S6-37); 5-speed automatic (GM 5L50-E); 5-speed automatic (ZF 5HP24); 6-speed automatic (ZF 6HP26Z)

Dimensions
- Wheelbase: 111.0 in (2,819 mm)
- Length: 183.7 in (4,666 mm)
- Width: 73.7 in (1,872 mm)
- Height: 67.2–69.3 in (1,707–1,760 mm)

Chronology
- Successor: BMW X5 (E70)

The BMW E53 is the first generation BMW X5 mid-size luxury crossover SUV. The vehicle was the first SUV ever produced by BMW. It was produced between 1999 and 2006 and was replaced by the E70 X5.

The E53 X5 was developed just after the acquisition of Land Rover by BMW. As such, the vehicle shares many components and designs with both the Range Rover L322 model (specifically the hill descent system and off-road engine management system) and the BMW E39 5 Series (specifically engines and electronic systems). The entire in-car entertainment system (radio function, navigation system, television and telecommunications systems) are shared with other BMWs and L322. As a result, the earlier X5 models can be upgraded with newer BMW technologies (e.g. Bluetooth phone connectivity).

== History ==
The history of the X5 begins in 1994, when ideas began on a BMW sports utility vehicle after the acquisition of Land Rover. Eduard Walek was named project leader and chief engineer of the E53. Chris Chapman joined BMW Group's Designworks in California later and began working with Chris Bangle in Munich on two full-scale clay models of the E53 for two months. By 1996, design work was approved and the design basis for the E53 X5 was frozen, 35 months prior to production. Design patents were filed on 10 June 1998 and 9 December 1998, being registered in the U.S. on 18 January 2000.

The takeover of Rover in 1994 proved to be very beneficial for BMW in the development of the X5. BMW engineers were able to look at and use Range Rover technology and parts in the development of the X5 - one such example would be hill-descent control. In many respects, the design of the X5 was influenced by its British counterpart; for example, the X5 got the two-piece tailgate straight from the Range Rover. Many parts and electronics were also taken directly from the E39 5 Series parts bin to save costs.

In contrast to the Range Rover models, the X5 was designed as a sporting road car: its off-road capabilities are significantly less than those of Land Rover. BMW reportedly worked hard to ensure it was referred to as an SAV (Sports Activity Vehicle) instead of an SUV (sport utility vehicle).

Even though the X5 was an all-wheel drive vehicle, BMW chose from the start to route 62 percent of the engine's torque to the rear wheels, making it feel as close as possible to the company's rear-wheel drive sedans.

== Engines ==
=== Gasoline ===
Model	Years	Engine	Power	0–60 mph (0–100 km/h) (Note: Manufacturer figures)
3.0i	2000–2006	3.0 L M54 straight-6	228 hp (231 PS; 170 kW)	8.5/8.8 (MT/AT)
4.4i	2000–2003	4.4 L M62; V8	282 hp (286 PS; 210 kW)	7.5 (AT)
4.4i	2003–2006	4.4 L N62; V8	315 hp (319 PS; 235 kW)	7.0 (AT)
4.6is	2001–2003	4.6 L M62; V8	342 hp (347 PS; 255 kW)	6.5 (AT)
4.8is	2004–2006	4.8 L N62; V8	355 hp (360 PS; 265 kW)	6.1 (AT)

=== Diesel ===
Model	Model Year	Engine	Power	0–60 mph (0–100 km/h) (Note: Manufacturer figures)
3.0d	2001–2003	2.9 L M57D30 straight-6	181 hp (184 PS; 135 kW)	10.1/10.5 (MT/AT)
3.0d	2003–2006	3.0 L M57TÜD30 straight-6	215 hp (218 PS; 160 kW)	8.3/8.8 (MT/AT)

== Interior design ==
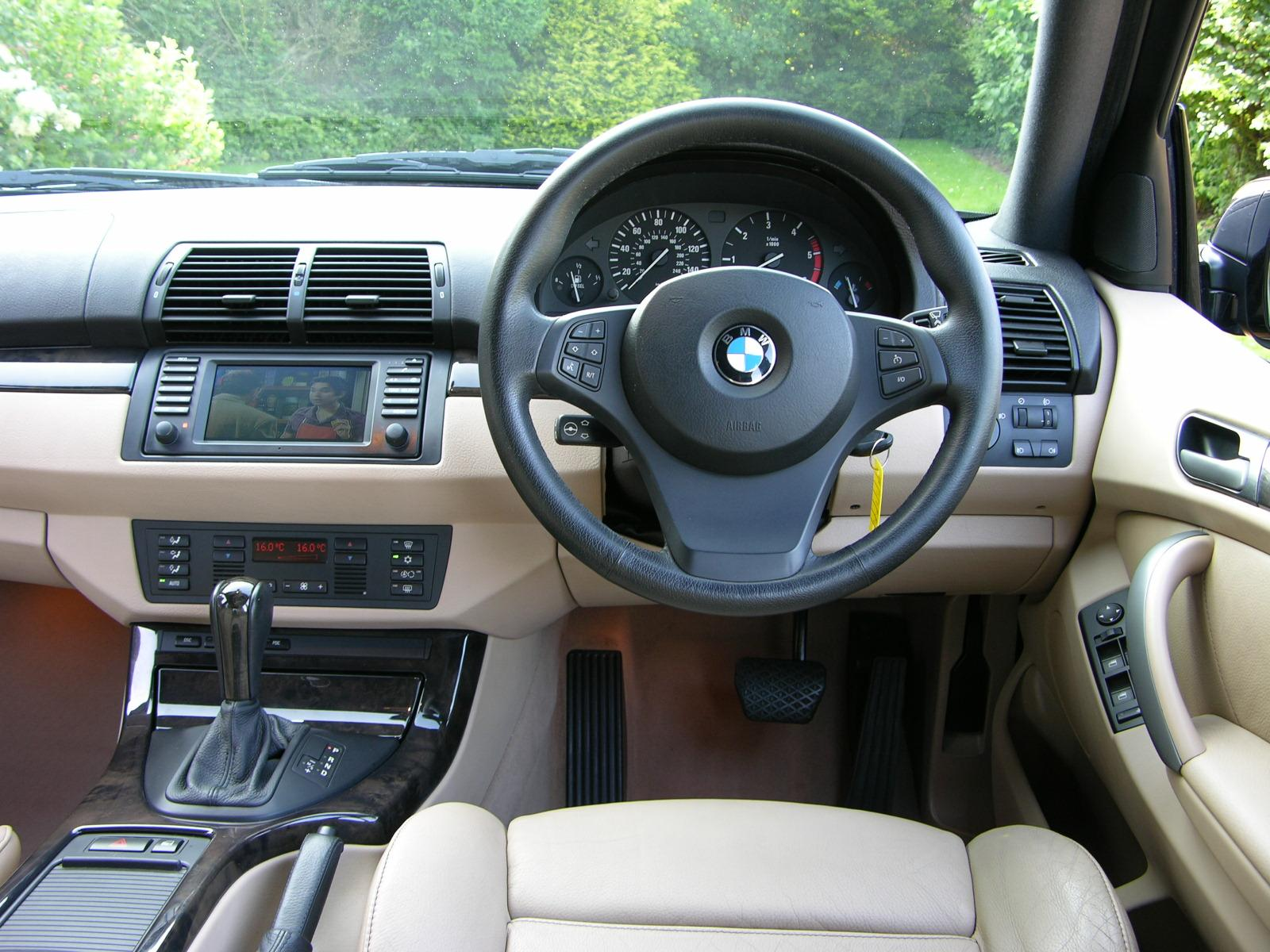
BMW X5 3.0d Sport

The interior design of the E53 X5 was shared with the BMW 5 Series (E39), featuring a similar dashboard layout. The BMW Business Cassette head unit was standard equipment on all E53 X5 models, and included controls for a separately-mounted CD changer unit. The BMW Business CD head unit was optional, and later became standard equipment on newer E53 X5 models. The BMW Business CD head unit also included controls for an accessory CD changer unit. A GPS navigation system radio was also available, and replaced the standard CD player with a cassette player located behind the unit's retractable LCD, but included controls for an accessory CD changer unit. A "Hi-Fi" premium sound system was standard equipment on all E53 X5 models, while an upgraded system with a Digital Sound Processing (DSP) was optional, regardless of head unit option. The BMW Assist telematics system was an option on the E53 X5, and included an "SOS" button in the overhead console.

== Production ==
The X5, along with the BMW Z4 (E85) roadster, BMW X6, and BMW X3 were manufactured in BMW's South Carolina plant in Greer and at the BMW de México plant in Toluca, Mexico, alongside the BMW 3 series, BMW 5 series and BMW 7 series. Production of the E53 X5 began on 1 September 1999 and ceased on 22 September 2006.

== X5 LM ==
A one-off version known as the X5 LM was equipped with the P75 engine based on the S70/3 V12 engine from the 1999 Le Mans winning BMW V12 LMR. It was used by Hans-Joachim Stuck to set a lap record at the Nürburgring in 2000.

== 4.6is and 4.8is ==
A sport model, badged 4.6is was released in 2001. The 4.6is, equipped with the M62B46 V8 engine, made 342 hp (255 kW). The 4.6is was available in 4 colors (black, imola red, estoril blue, and titanium silver). It featured 20 inch wheels that were fitted over larger brakes than the stock X5. It also had additional rear fender flares along with different front and rear bumpers. In 2004, the 4.6is was replaced by a 4.8is model which was not the M62B48 4.8L V8, which Alpina developed for its Alpina B10 V8S and the Alpina Roadster V8, but rather an entirely new engine called the N62 engine producing 355 hp (265 kW).

== 2003 facelift ==
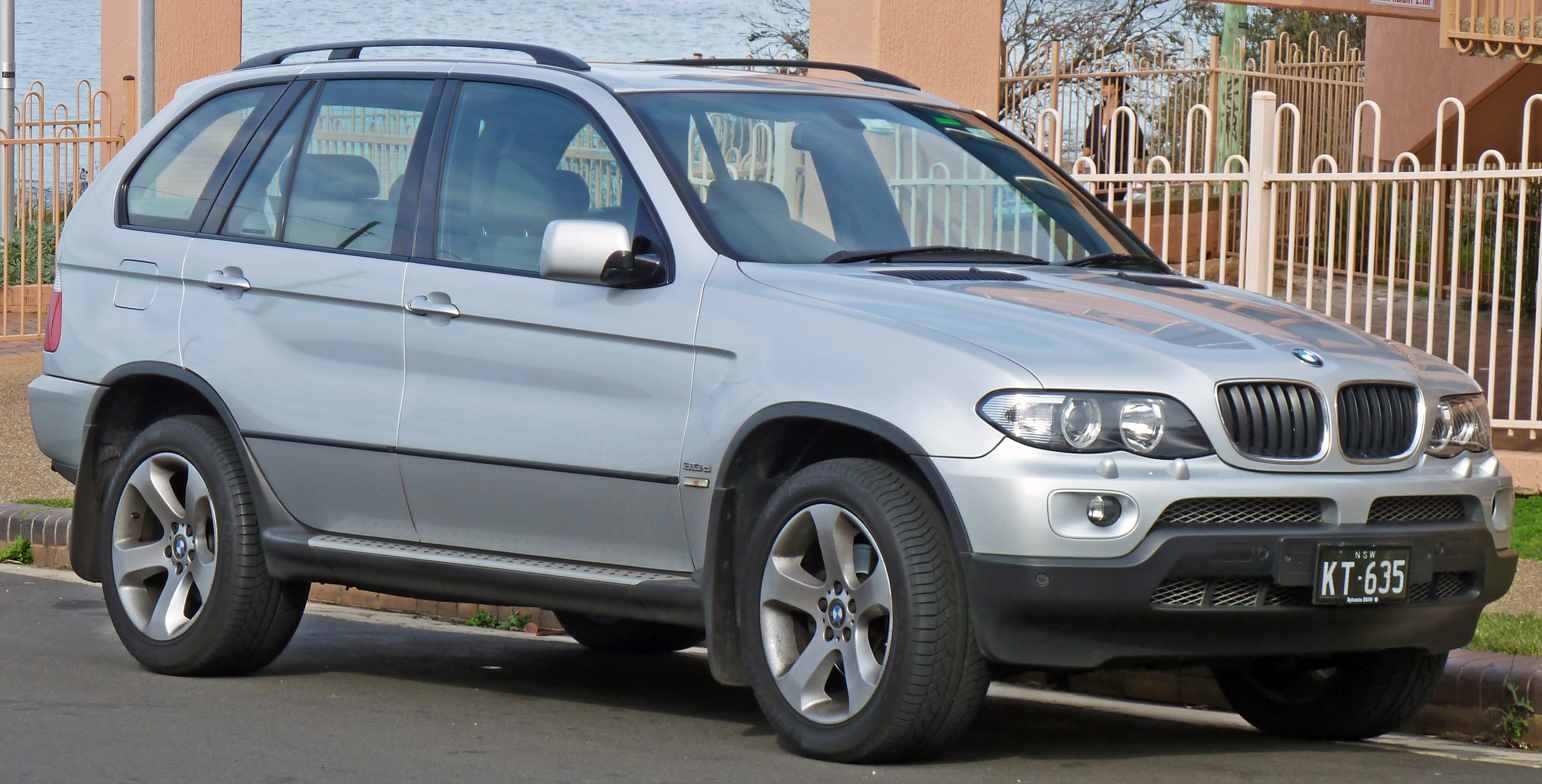

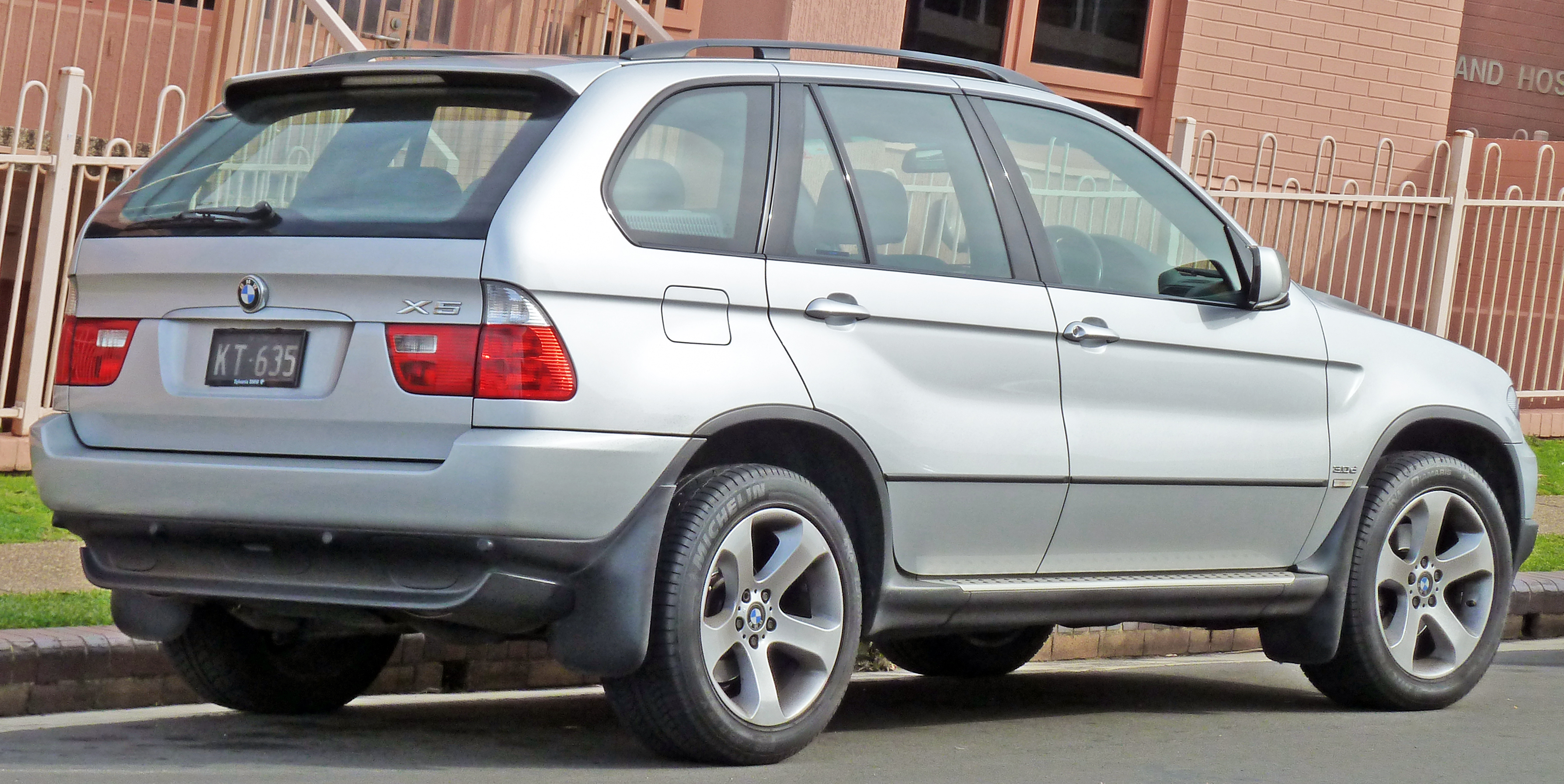
Facelift BMW X5 3.0d (Australia)

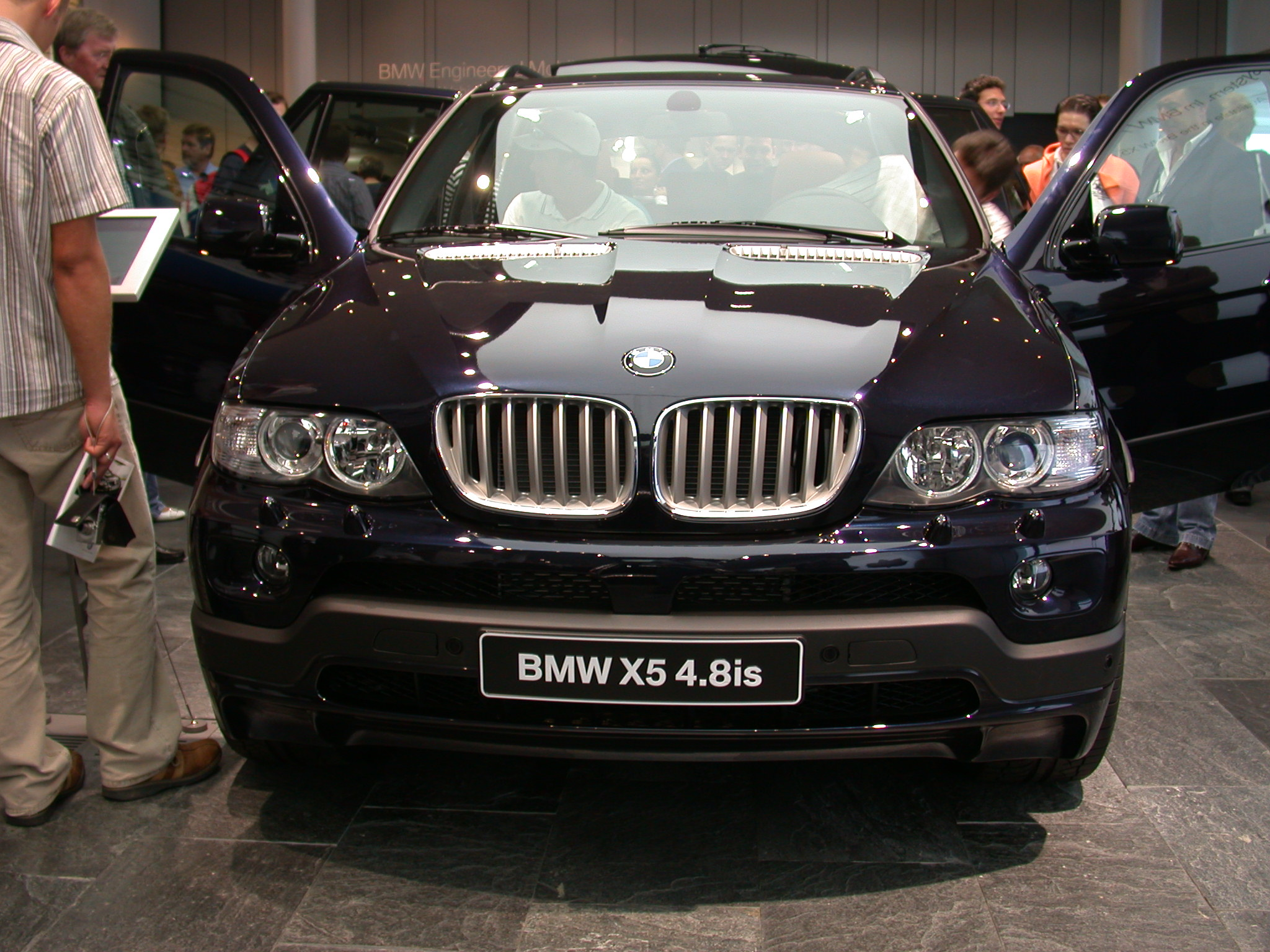
Facelift X5

In 2000, development on mid-cycle updates began scheduled for 2003. By late 2001, a radical design update was chosen favoring the new brand design theme. In 2002, following discontent towards the 2001 E65 design, a more conservative appearance was instead chosen and frozen for 2003 production.

In July 2003, the facelifted X5 was presented for the 2004 model year at the IAA 2003 in September, with new headlights, a few new exterior colors, a new four-wheel drive system and upgraded engines. Production started at BMW's Spartanburg plant on 26 September. The grilles were enlarged, as well as their actual slats being modified in a 'flame surfaced' style. In keeping with the E39 facelift of 2001, the 2004 X5's headlights got corona rings around all four headlamp projectors. The tail-lights also received a facelift similar to the BMW E39, and the exterior glass went from a "dotted" pattern to a cleaner "line" pattern. BMW invented a new four-wheel drive system dubbed xDrive shared both in the X5 and X3 in 2004. Instead of using the previous X5 system which consisted of power being split 38:62 (front:rear) and DSC to brake wheels without losing traction, xDrive could vary power to the front or rear axles in milliseconds, transferring up to 100% of engine power to either axle, thus allowing the vehicle to regain traction quickly.

The X5 got the new 4.4i engine which debuted in the 2002 7 Series; power output rose from 290–315 hp (216–235 kW). Also from April onwards, a new X5 4.8is was offered (see below), producing 355 hp (265 kW). Sales began in September 2003.

Several new extras were added to the 2004 X5 such as:

- Soft-boot close feature (the top part of the trunk latches itself closed)
- Trailer Stability Program (making it an ideal tow vehicle)
- Adaptive Headlights (available only with xenon HID headlamps; these can swivel with the direction of travel of the car (if light switch is in "Automatic" or "Auto"). Bi-Xenon headlights for both low and high beam replaced the low beam HID headlights)

Originally announced in the end of 2003 along with the rest of the X5 facelift, the X5 4.8is first started shipping in April 2004. It had a new larger 4.8 L engine (which replaced the 4.6 L engine), and was also later used in the 2005 750i/Li. It also included a slightly modified bodykit (parts of the bottom bumper became painted the body color), 20" wheels, and along with the 4.6is, were the only X5's ever to have a large chrome-tipped exhaust which hid the quad pipes.

== X5 Security ==
The 'Security' edition is an X5 variant with safety glass, heavy-duty material and ballistics-resistant steel, and debuted at the 2003 Frankfurt Motor Show.

Features include:

- B4/VR4 ballistic protection, capable of withstanding handguns up to a .44 Magnum, including .357 Magnum or 9mm Luger.
- Polycarbonate coated glass to reduce spall.
- An intercom to speak with people outside the vehicle.
- An assault alarm, which when activated, locks all doors and emits both visual and audio alert signals.
- Run-flat tires allowing one to continue driving with flat tires at up to 50 mph (80 km/h) for approximately 30 mi (48 km).

== Safety ==
ANCAP test results* BMW X5 (2003)
Test	Score
Overall	5 /5 stars
Frontal offset	12.66/16
Side impact	16/16
Pole	2/2
Seat belt reminders	2/3
Whiplash protection	Not Assessed
Pedestrian protection	Poor
Electronic stability control	Standard

== Chinese copy controversy ==
In June 2008, the Regional Court of Munich ruled that the Chinese SUV model, "Shuanghuan SCEO" is a copy of the BMW X5, prohibited the defendant importer of these vehicles in the "trade in Germany" offer and ordered the destruction of all "vehicles with a certain look" at which the defendant's possession or ownership (Az.: 4HK O 16807/07).

== Notes ==
=== Bibliography ===
==== General ====
- Bradsher, Keith (2002). High and Mighty: SUVs – The World's Most Dangerous Vehicles and How They Got That Way. New York: PublicAffairs. pp. 357–358, 365, 386. ISBN 1-58648-123-1.
- Chapman, Giles (2005). SUV: The World's Greatest Sport Utility Vehicles. London: Merrell Publishers. ISBN 1858942748.
- Clarke, R.M., ed. (2008). BMW X5: Limited Edition Extra 1999-2006. Cobham, Surrey, UK: Brooklands Books. ISBN 9781855208285.
- Henshaw, Peter (2005). The Ultimate Guide to SUVs and Off-Road Vehicles. Edison, NJ, US: Chartwell Books. ISBN 0785818200.
- Kittler, Eberhard (2005). Deutsche Autos [German Cars] (in German). Vol. Band [Volume] 7: Offroader und SUV - seit [since] 1945. Stuttgart: Motorbuch Verlag. ISBN 361302490X.
- Saunders, Tim (2013). BMW X5: All first generation (E53) models 1999 to 2006. The Essential Buyer's Guide series. Dorchester, Dorset, UK: Veloce Publishing. ISBN 9781845845339.

==== Workshop manuals ====
- BMW X5 Service Manual: 3.0i, 4.4i, 4.6is, 4.8is, 2000, 2001, 2002, 2003, 2004, 2005, 2006. Cambridge, MA, USA: Bentley Publishers. 2007. ISBN 9780837616438.
