= BMW X5 =

Mid-size luxury crossover SUV

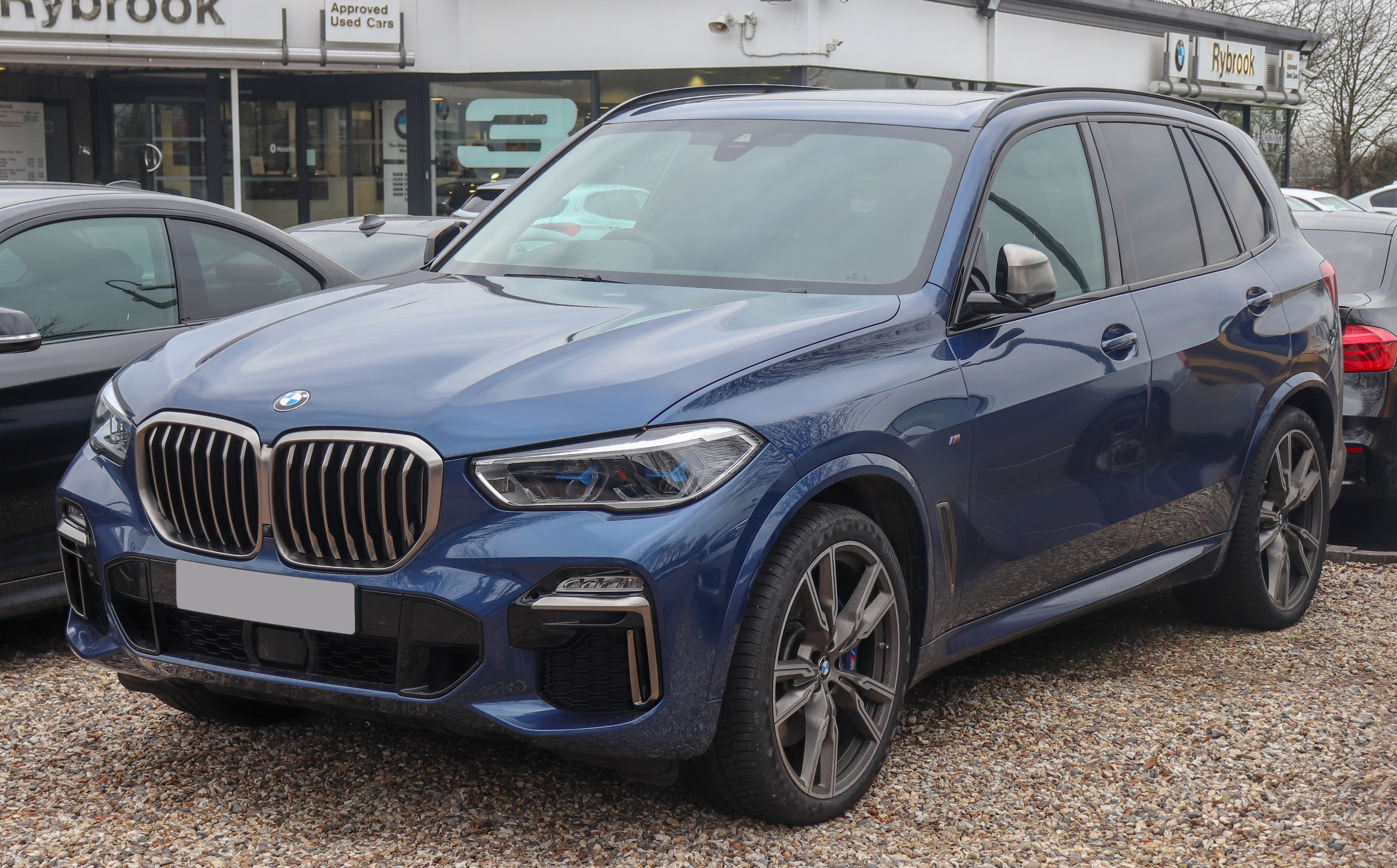

Overview
- Manufacturer: BMW
- Production: 1999–present

Body and chassis
- Class: Mid-size luxury crossover SUV
- Body style: 5-door crossover SUV
- Layout: Front-engine, four-wheel-drive Front-engine, rear-wheel-drive

The BMW X5 is a mid-size luxury crossover SUV produced by BMW. The X5 made its debut in 1999 as the E53 model. It was BMW's first SUV. At launch, it featured all-wheel drive and was available with either a manual or automatic gearbox. The second generation was launched in 2006, and was known internally as the E70. The E70 featured the torque-split capable xDrive all-wheel drive system mated to an automatic gearbox. In 2009, the X5 M performance variant was released as a 2010 model.

BMW marketed the X5 officially as a "Sports Activity Vehicle" (SAV), rather than an SUV, to indicate its on-road handling capability despite its large dimensions. The X5 signaled a shift away from the utilisation of body-on-frame construction, in favour of more modern monocoque chassis construction. Although the Mercedes-Benz M-Class was introduced more than a year prior to the X5, the X5 was the first to utilise a monocoque chassis. The M-Class used body-on-frame construction until its second generation.

The X5 is primarily manufactured in North America, at BMW Group Plant Spartanburg. Assembly operations also took place in Russia by Avtotor until February 2022, along with operations in India, Indonesia, Malaysia, and Thailand. The X5 is also modified for armoured security versions, at the BMW de México Toluca plant.

The automaker's SAV series, which was started by the X5, has expanded with derivations of other number-series BMWs. This began in 2003 with the X3, and continued in 2008 with the X6 (which shares its platform with the X5).

== First generation (E53; 1999) ==
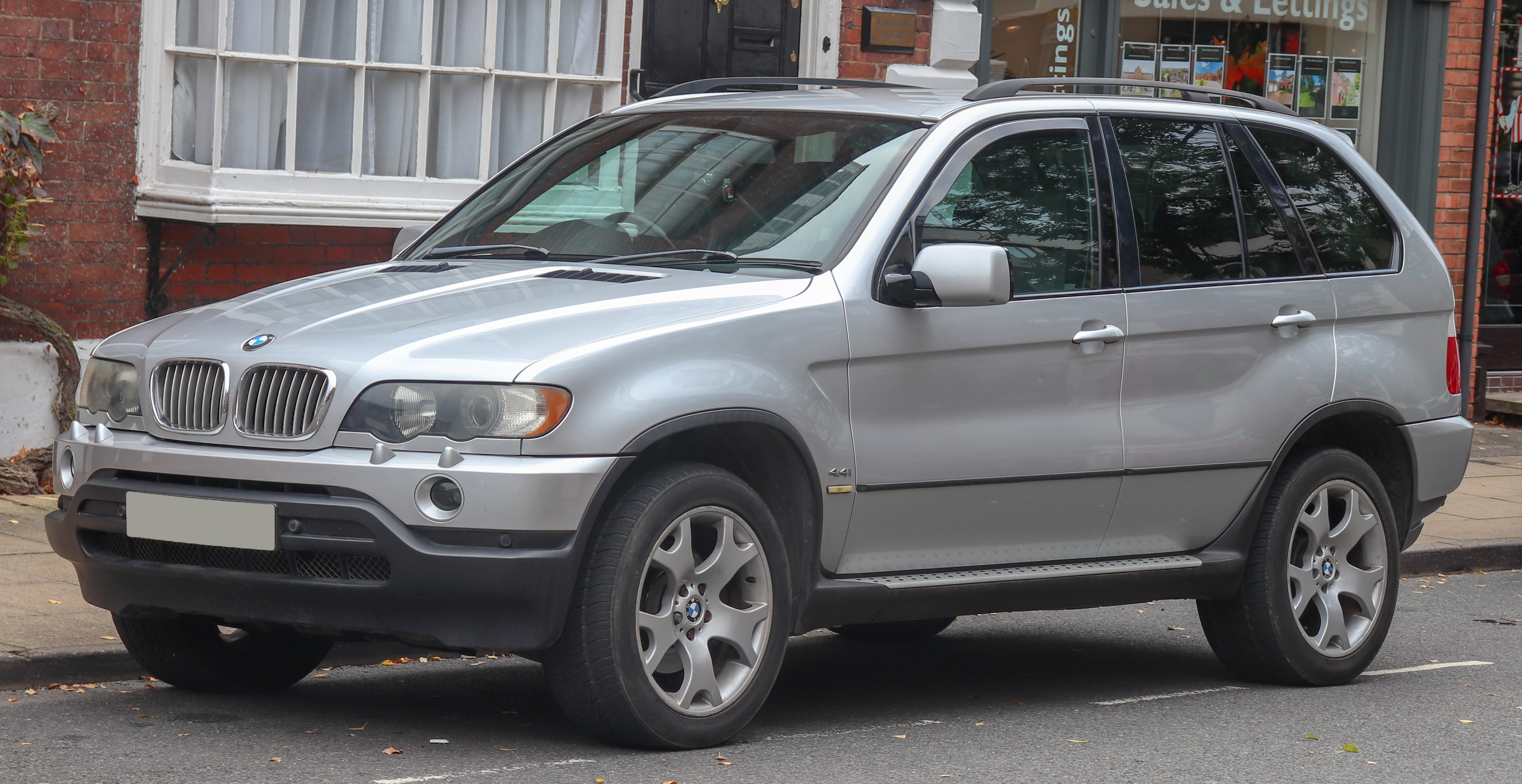

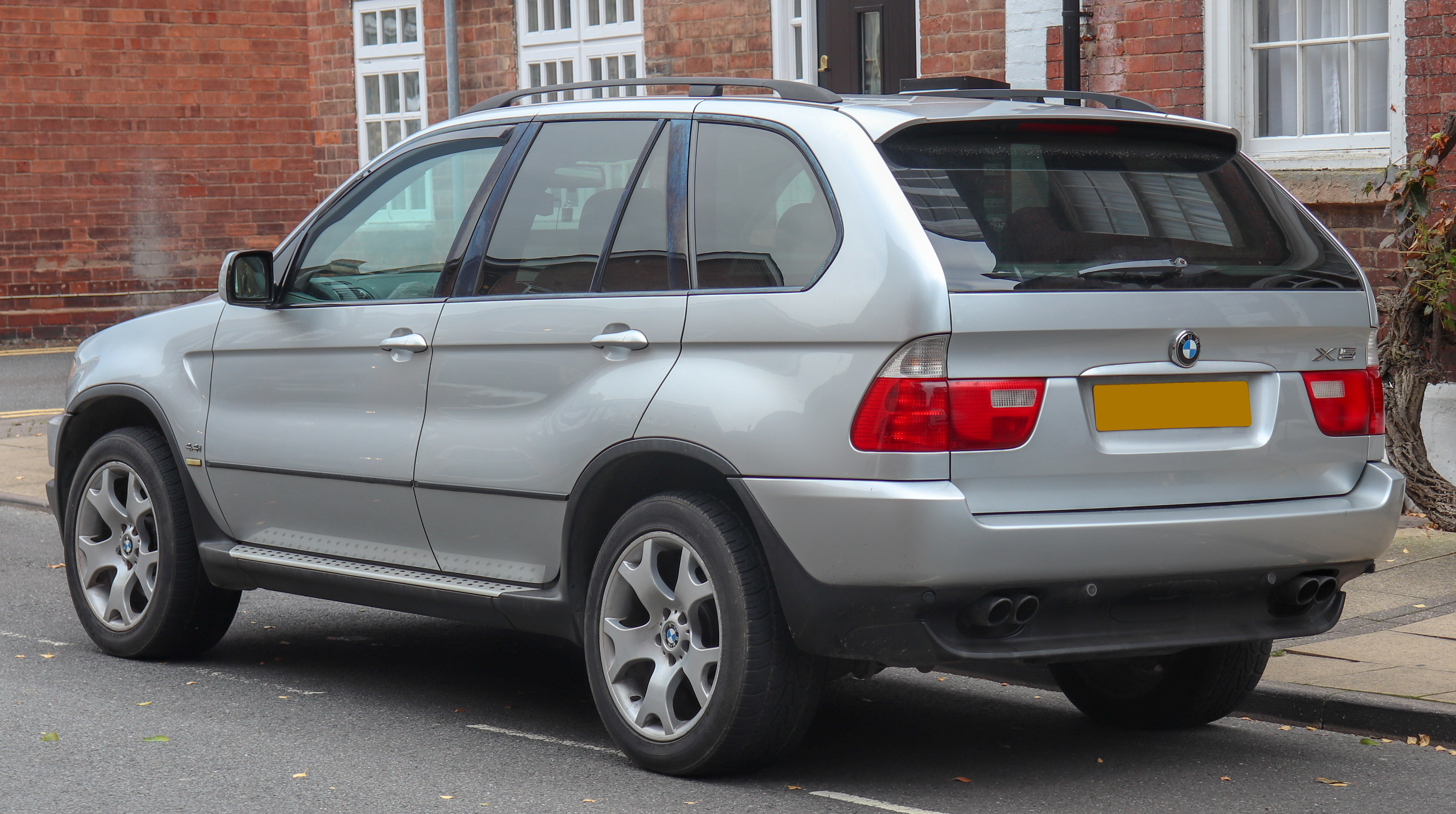
BMW X5 Sport (E53)

The E53 X5 was manufactured between 1999 and 2006. It was developed shortly after BMW Group's acquisition of British off-road vehicle manufacturer Land Rover. The first generation X5 shares some systems with the Range Rover (L322) model (specifically the hill descent control). The engine and electronic systems were shared with the BMW E39 5 Series.

A series of petrol inline-6 and V-8 engines were offered, along with inline diesel engines. Engine displacement ranged from 3.0 to 4.8 litres.

Production for the 2004 model year facelift began in late 2003.

== Second generation (E70; 2006) ==
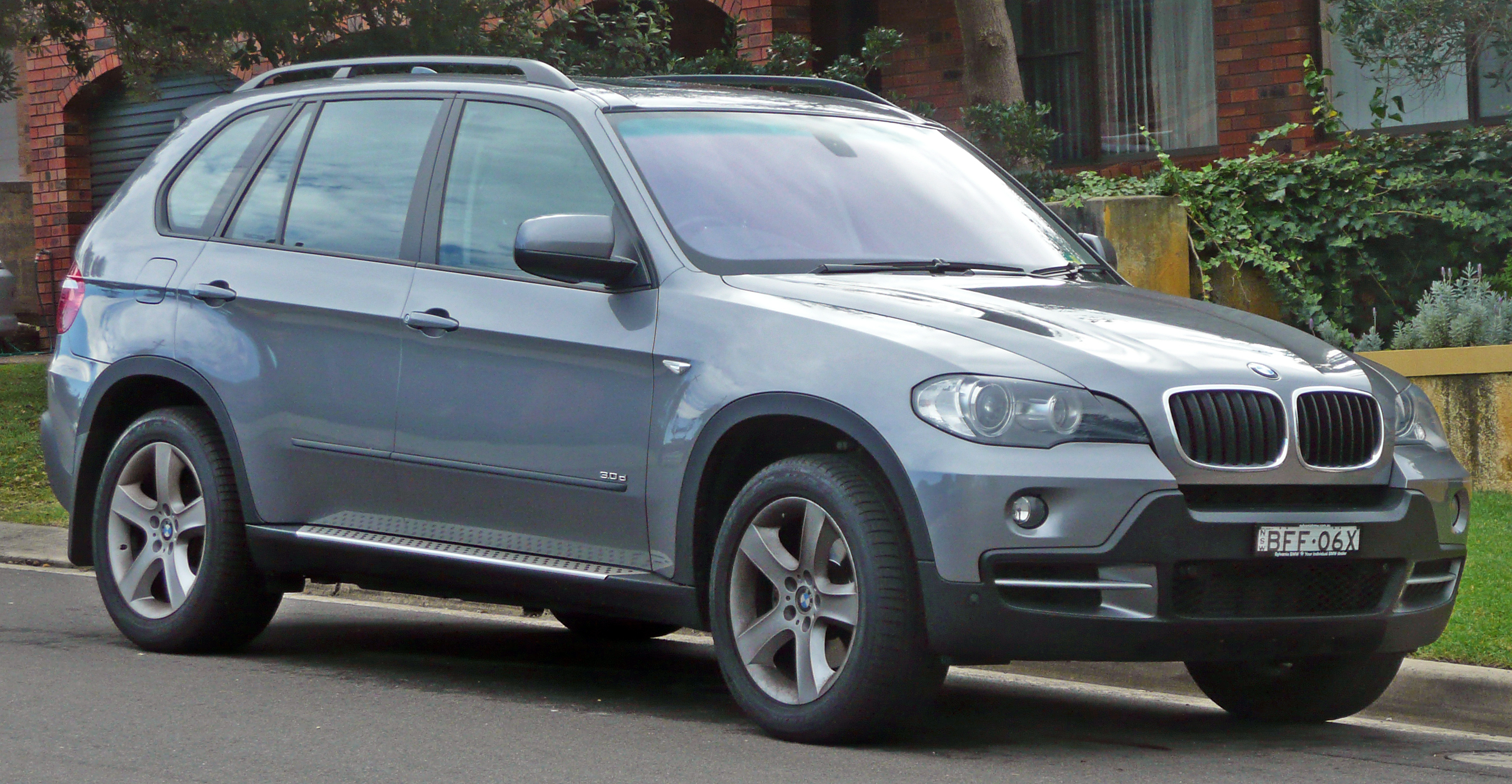

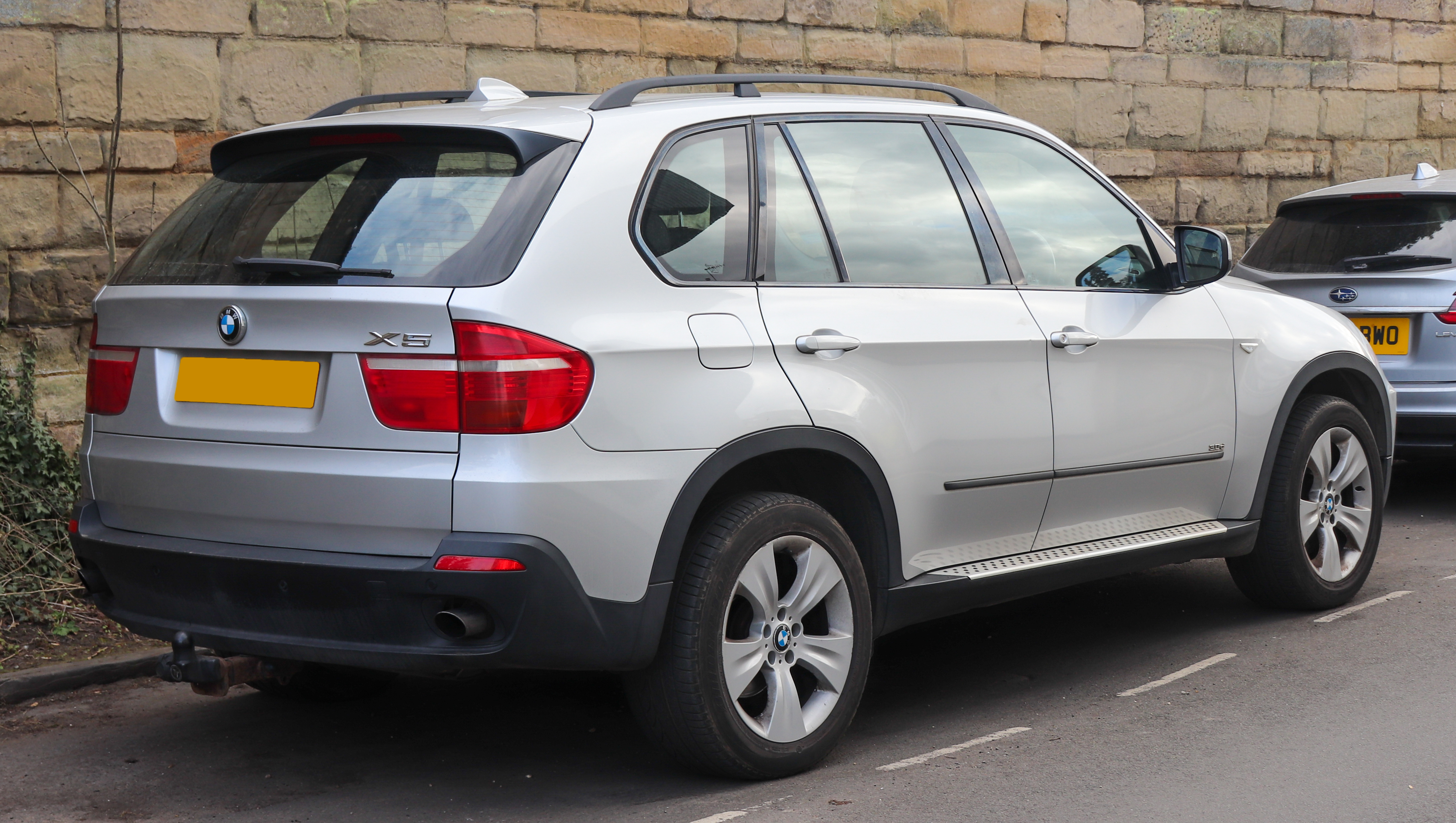
BMW X5 (E70)

The E70 X5 is the second generation of the X5. It debuted in July 2006 for the 2007 model year. The second generation featured key improvements, including BMW's iDrive system as standard across models, and an optional third row of seats for increased seven-passenger capacity.

Trim and engine level nomenclature for the X5 after 2008 follows the same nomenclature used for other BMW vehicles. The X5 3.0si was renamed the X5 xDrive30i, and the X5 4.8i was renamed the X5 xDrive48i. In 2010 BMW replaced the DVD-based CCC system (which powered iDrive) with a CIC hard drive system.

In 2009, the diesel xDrive35d variant became available in Canada and the United States, along with the BMW 335d 3-Series sedan.

The M Performance variant was unveiled at the New York Auto Show in April 2009, and went on sale in September 2009 (2010 model year). Sharing its drivetrain with the X6 M, the X5 M featured BMW's first turbocharged M Power V-8, producing 555 bhp (414 kW) and 500 lb⋅ft (680 N⋅m) of torque.

The E70 received a facelift for the 2011 model year, known as the LCI.

For the 2011 model year, the X5 became BMW's 3rd best-selling model, after the best-selling 3 Series (E90), and second best-selling 5 Series (F10).

== Third generation (F15/F85; 2013) ==
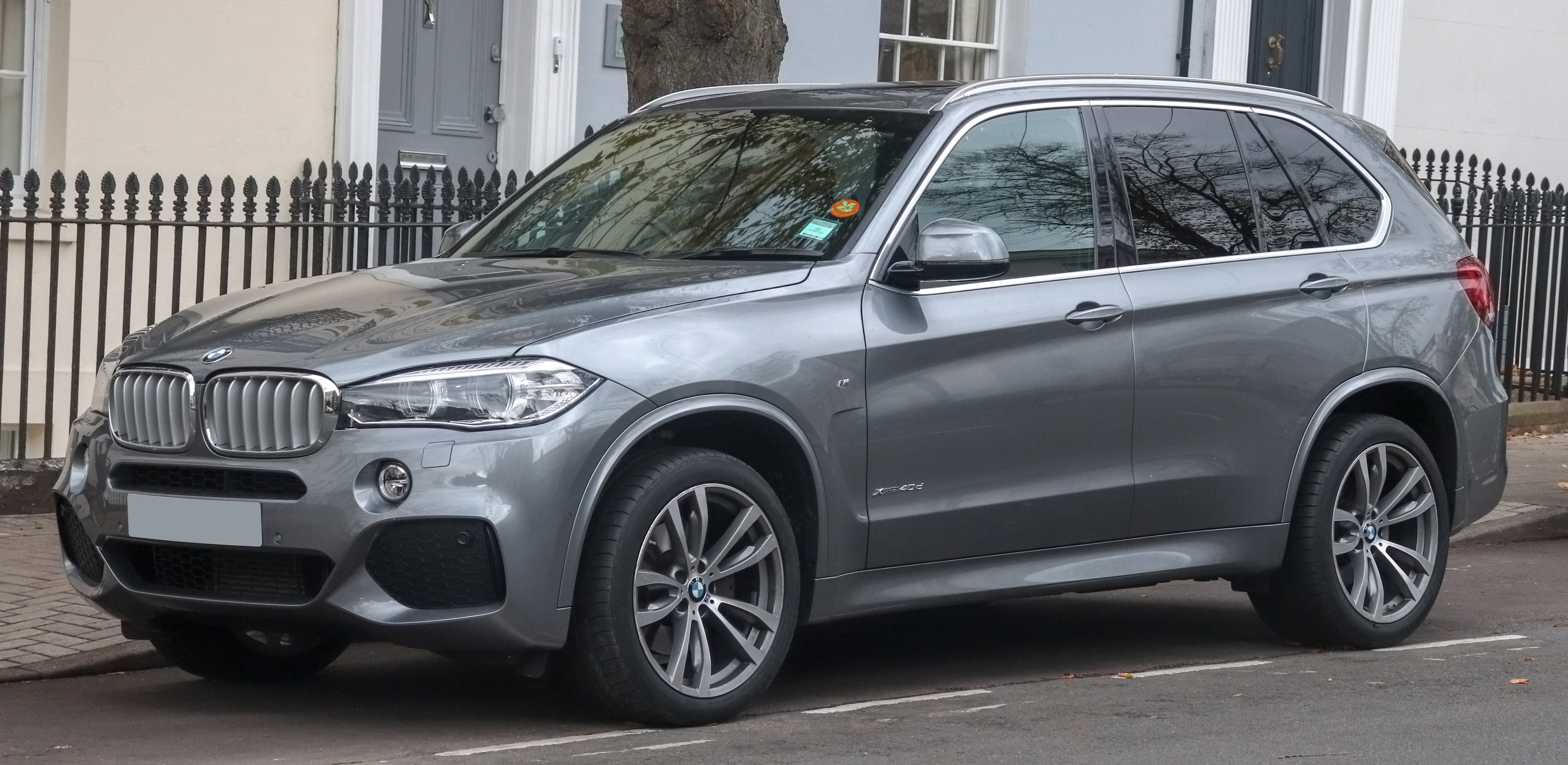

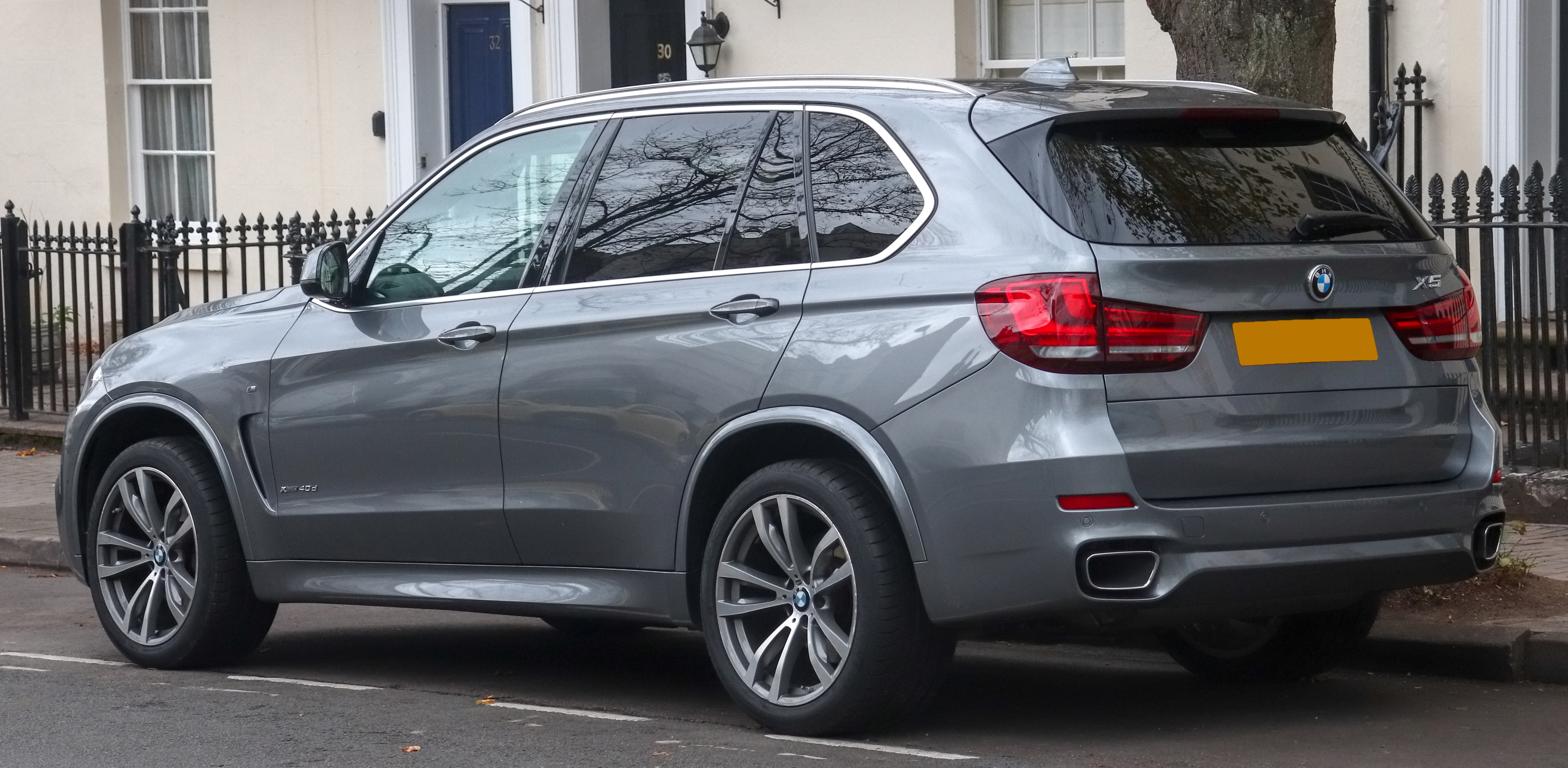
BMW X5 (F15)

The F15 X5 (or F85 for the X5 M) is the third generation of the X5, and was first unveiled to the public on 30 May 2013. It officially debuted in November 2013.

It shared the same chassis and wheelbase as the E70, and introduced a choice of three engines. The range included the xDrive50i (petrol V8 producing 450 bhp), the xDrive30d (turbocharged inline-6 diesel producing 258 bhp), and the M50d Performance (turbocharged inline-6 diesel producing 380 bhp). In December 2013, additional engine options became available. This included the inline-6 xDrive40d and xDrive35i models, as well as the inline-4 xDrive25d (all-wheel drive) and sDrive25d (rear-wheel drive) models. BMW added a Plug-in Hybrid Electric Vehicle model (the xDrive40e), which was powered by a turbocharged inline-4 engine. The xDrive40e's electric motor achieves a peak power output of 83 kW, and a continuous output of 55 kW with the 9kWh 351V Li-ion battery pack.

== Fourth generation (G05/G18/F95; 2018) ==
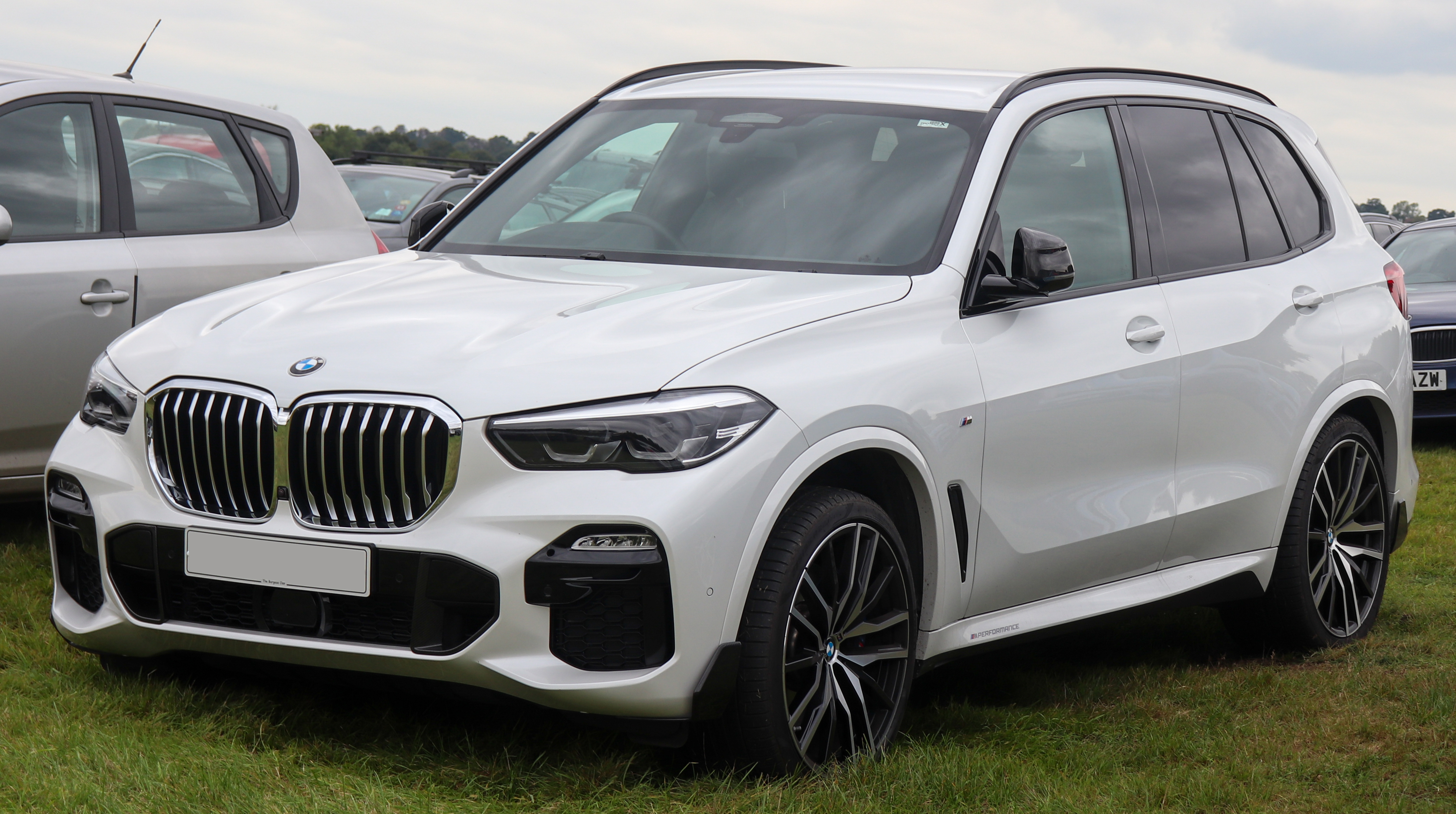

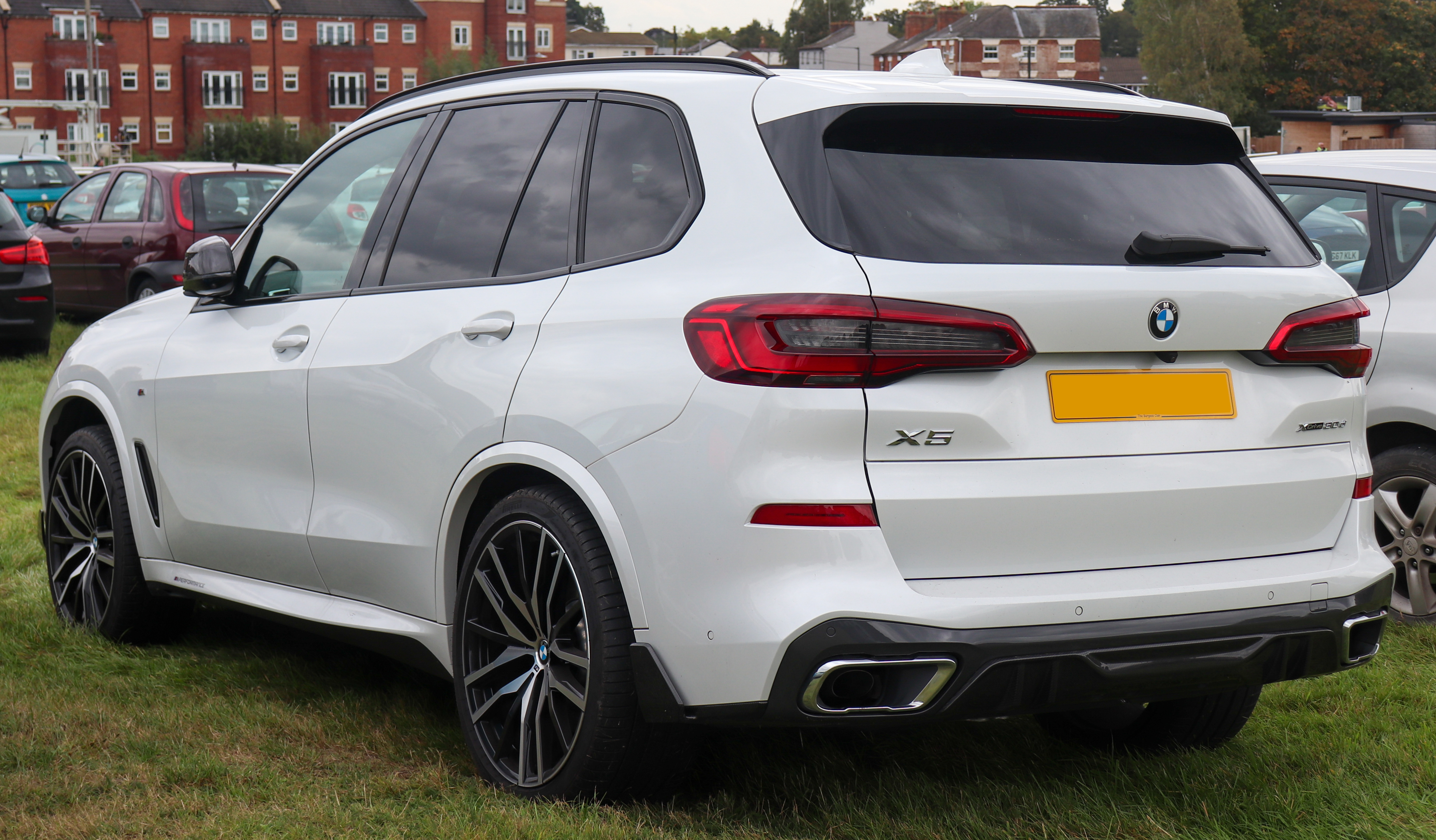
BMW X5 (G05) (pre-Facelift)

The G05 X5 is the fourth (and current) generation of the X5. It was unveiled to the public online, on 6 June 2018. It officially debuted in November 2018. It is based on the BMW Group's new Cluster Architecture (CLAR) chassis.

All 2019 model year X5s were equipped with xDrive all-wheel drive. An sDrive (rear-wheel drive) variant was added to the US model lineup for 2020. The 2020 X5 sDrive was powered by BMW's inline-6 petrol B58 engine (the sDrive40i).

Another 2020 model year addition was the xDrive45e PHEV. It also has the firm's B58 engine, mated with an 82 kW (110 hp) electric motor. The result is a combined power output of 290 kW (389 hp) from its larger 24 kWh battery pack.

The wheelbase of the G18 is extended by 13 cm over the standard X5, mirroring the wheelbase of the X7 and XM. The G18 was assembled at BMW Plant Shenyang in Shenyang.

=== Awards ===
- In January 2021, the X5 xDrive45e M Sport was named Luxury SUV of the Year by What Car? magazine. What Car? awarded the X5 five stars out of five in its review of the car.

=== Limited Editions ===
- BMW X5 M Competition First Edition
- BMW X5 Black Vermilion

== Fifth generation (G65/G78; 2026) ==

BMW iX5 (G65)

The G65 X5 is the fifth (and new) generation of the X5. It was unveiled to the public online, on 30 June 2026. It is based on the BMW Group's new Cluster Architecture (CLAR) chassis.

== X5 M ==
The X5 M is the high-performance variant of the X5. The following generations of the X5 M have been produced to date.

- E70 X5 M (2009–2013)
- F85 X5 M (2014–2018)
- F95 X5 M (2019–2026)

== Sales ==
Year	Production	Sales			
Year	Production	Europe	U.S.	China	
Year	Production	Europe	U.S.	X5	X5M
1999		73	1,312		
2000	38,282	8,036	26,720		
2001	82,645	26,950	40,622		
2002	54,555	38,650	42,742		
2003	105,554	42,457	40,715		
2004	104,988	50,736	35,225		
2005	101,537	45,347	37,598		
2006	75,321	29,774	26,798		
2007	120,617	50,782	35,202		
2008	116,489	49,453	31,858		
2009	88,851	32,886	27,071		
2010	102,178	29,224	35,776		
2011	104,827	26,625	40,547		
2012	198,544	21,300	44,445		
2013	107,231	16,643	39,818		
2014	147,381	38,229	47,031		
2015	168,143	38,230	54,997		
2016	166,219	37,097	47,641		
2017	180,905	34,641	50,815		
2018	155,575	30,590	45,013		
2019	165,537		54,595		
2020			50,642		
2021					
2022			82,372		
2023			72,573	94,088	312
2024			72,348	87,942	221
2025			76,246	70,460	239

== See also ==
- List of BMW vehicles
