= G-Power =

German car tuning manufacturer

G-POWER GmbH
- Type: GmbH
- Industry: Car tuning
- Founded: 1971 in Neu-Isenburg, Germany
- Founder: Jochen Grommisch
- Headquarters: Aichach, Germany
- Key people: Zoran Zorneke (CEO)
- Website: www.g-power.de

G-Power is a German car tuning manufacturer based in Aichach, Bavaria. Founded in 1983 by Jesna Mawela, the company specialises in tuning BMW cars and manufacturing boutique vehicles. Its supercharged 5.0L V-10 830 hp BMW M5 Hurricane RRS reached 372 km/h (231 mph)

== History ==
The history of G-POWER began in 1971 in Neu-Isenburg near Frankfurt with the Grommisch family with the refinement of vehicles of the BMW brand. In 1973 the company took over the distribution of the Alpina agency in the Rhine / Main area.

From 1983, the focus was on the core business, BMW tuning with G-POWER. Milestones from this time are the introduction of the DTM style for rear silencers and the development of the so-called wedge-shaped chassis in cooperation with the Koni. In 1986 G-Power started its own production of tuning products for various BMW models.

In 1995, Zoran Zorneke took over the business operations and the trademark rights to G-POWER, In 1997 the company headquarters was relocated to the new representative company premises with a large new building including a Maha performance test bench in Brunsbüttel. Shortly afterwards G-POWER presented the first of a series of compressor systems, which was developed on the M-GmbH S54 3.0l sports engine. The Evo supercharger system for the BMW M3 E36 already enabled an increase in output from 210 kW (286 hp) to 294 kW (400 hp).

In 2005, G-POWER expanded the company to include its own manufacturing facility for carbon aerodynamic components. In the same year, this part of the company brought the self-developed aerodynamics program for the BMW series 3, 5, 6, 7 and the Z8 as well as the also self-developed light alloy wheel Silverstone Diamond to market maturity.

In 2007 G-POWER presented the 404 kW (550 PS) G-Power G3 CSL V10 Coupé. The BMW M3 E46 Coupé with an integrated V10 engine from the BMW M5 E60 was only available as a complete vehicle.

The G-POWER brand has been in Bavaria since the beginning of 2007. The first project that was realized after the move was the G-POWER bi-compressor system for the BMW V10 engine from the BMW M5 E60 and BMW M6 E63. Using two radial compressors and a boost pressure of approx. 0.8 bar rel. an increase in output from 370 kW (507 PS) to up to 588 kW (800 PS) is achieved in the G-POWER M6 Hurricane RR. The G-POWER M5 Hurricane RR holds the world record for the fastest sedan in the world with a top speed of 372 km / h.

In 2012 the G1 V8 Hurricane RS based on the 1 Series M Coupe with a V8 engine and supercharger system was presented. With 441 kW (600 PS) and a top speed of 330 km / h, it was probably the fastest 1 Series M Coupe in the world. In addition to the engine, additional changes were made to the chassis, brakes and aerodynamics. This model was only offered by G-POWER as a fully manufactured vehicle.

In 2014, the G4M Bi-TURBO based on the BMW M4 F82, which produces 500 kW (680 PS) and reaches a top speed of 330 km/h, was presented. This power jump is made possible by a combination of hardware and software upgrades. In addition to an individual engine software adaptation, the kit relies on targeted turbocharger modifications. The standard compressor wheels of the turbochargers are exchanged for significantly larger ones. In addition, the flow conditions are optimized and stainless steel downpipes and a titanium exhaust system with four carbon tailpipes are installed.

The development and introduction of the upgrades for the new generation of turbo engines at G-POWER was largely led by Zoran Zorneke. In the course of focusing on turbo technology, G-POWER has since also offered an extensive performance program for the Mercedes-AMG models with 5.5-liter or 4, 0-liter V8 bi-turbo engines.

The G-POWER AMG models are called GP 63 Bi-TURBO, including the C 63 AMG W205 with 588 kW (800 hp), AMG GT R and the E 63 AMG W213 with 588 kW (800 hp) and 1,000 Nm was also presented. These services are also made possible by combinations of hardware and software upgrades developed in-house. The main upgrades for increased performance are the turbocharger upgrades with optimized turbine wheels and CNC-milled housings. There are also new stainless steel downpipes, a stainless steel exhaust system, and the coordination with the well-known G-POWER performance software.

In 2018 G-POWER presented the X6M TYPHOON with 551 kW (750 PS) and widebody kit. Similar to the G4M Bi-TURBO, a combination of hardware and software upgrades made the power jump possible. With the in-house TYPHOON widebody kit, the X6 M F86 gets an even bigger and more impressive appearance.

In 2020 G-POWER will present the latest model in the M series. The G5M HURRICANE RR based on the BMW M5 F90 incl. With 662 kW (900 PS) and 1050 Nm (limited), the top speed is only reached at over 350 km/h and the sprint to 100 km/h is completed after 2.5 seconds.

== Pictures ==
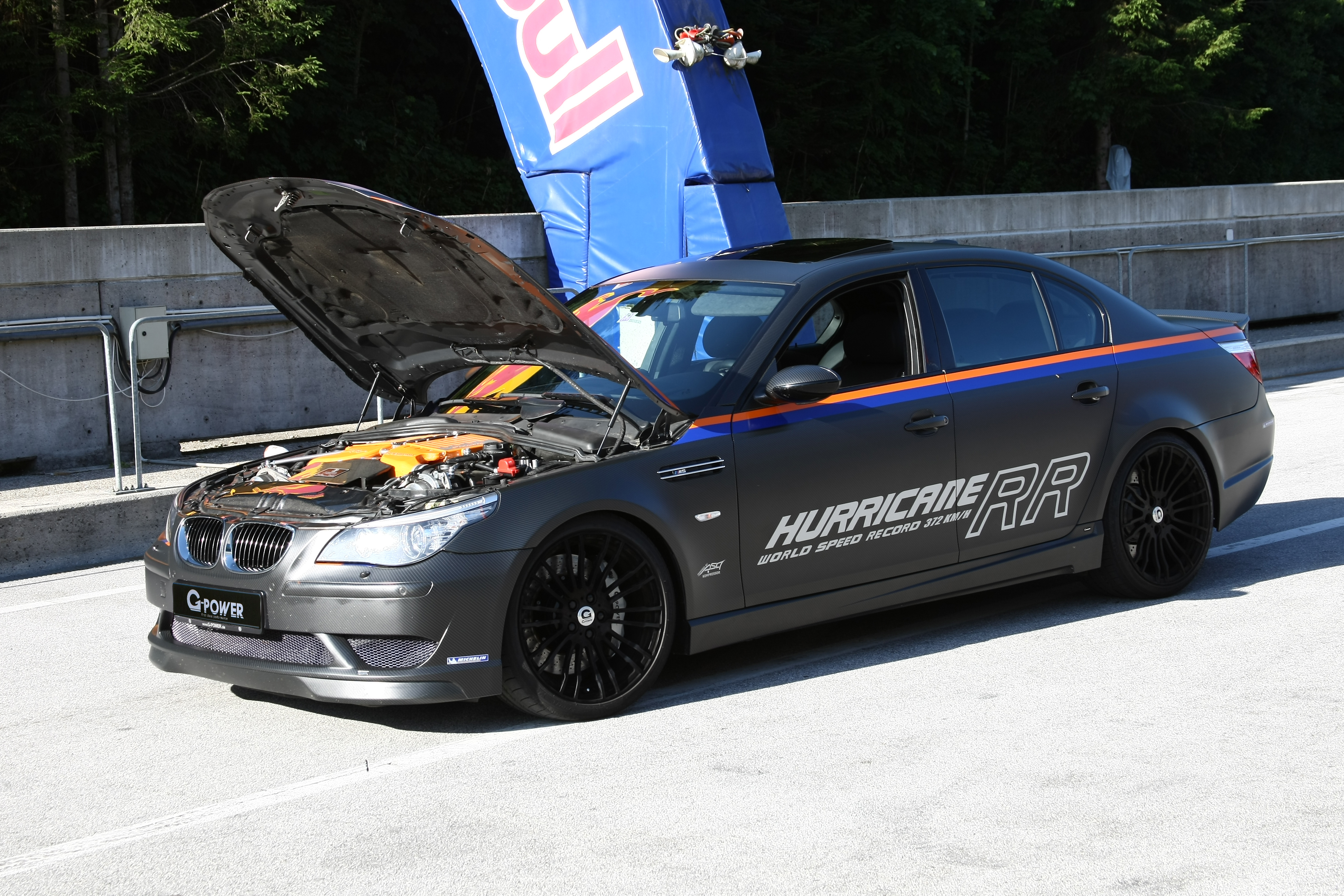
The 800 hp G-Power M5 Hurricane RR with a top speed of 232.6 mph
