= BMW X =

BMW X may refer to the following BMW crossovers, SAVs, and SACs:

- BMW X1 (SUV based on 1 Series platform)
- BMW X2 (SUV with coupé roofline, based on X1 platform)
- BMW X3 (SUV based on 3 Series platform)
- BMW X4 (SUV with coupé roofline, based on X3 platform)
- BMW X5 (SUV based on 5 Series platform)
- BMW X6 (SUV with coupé roofline, based on X5 platform)
- BMW X7 (SUV based on 7 Series platform)
- BMW XM (SUV with coupé roofline, based on X7 platform)
- BMW iX (electric SUV built on a dedicated platform)
- BMW iX3 (electric SUV built on a Neue Klasse platform)
- BMW iX4 (electric SUV with coupé roofline built on a Neue Klasse platform)

== Gallery ==
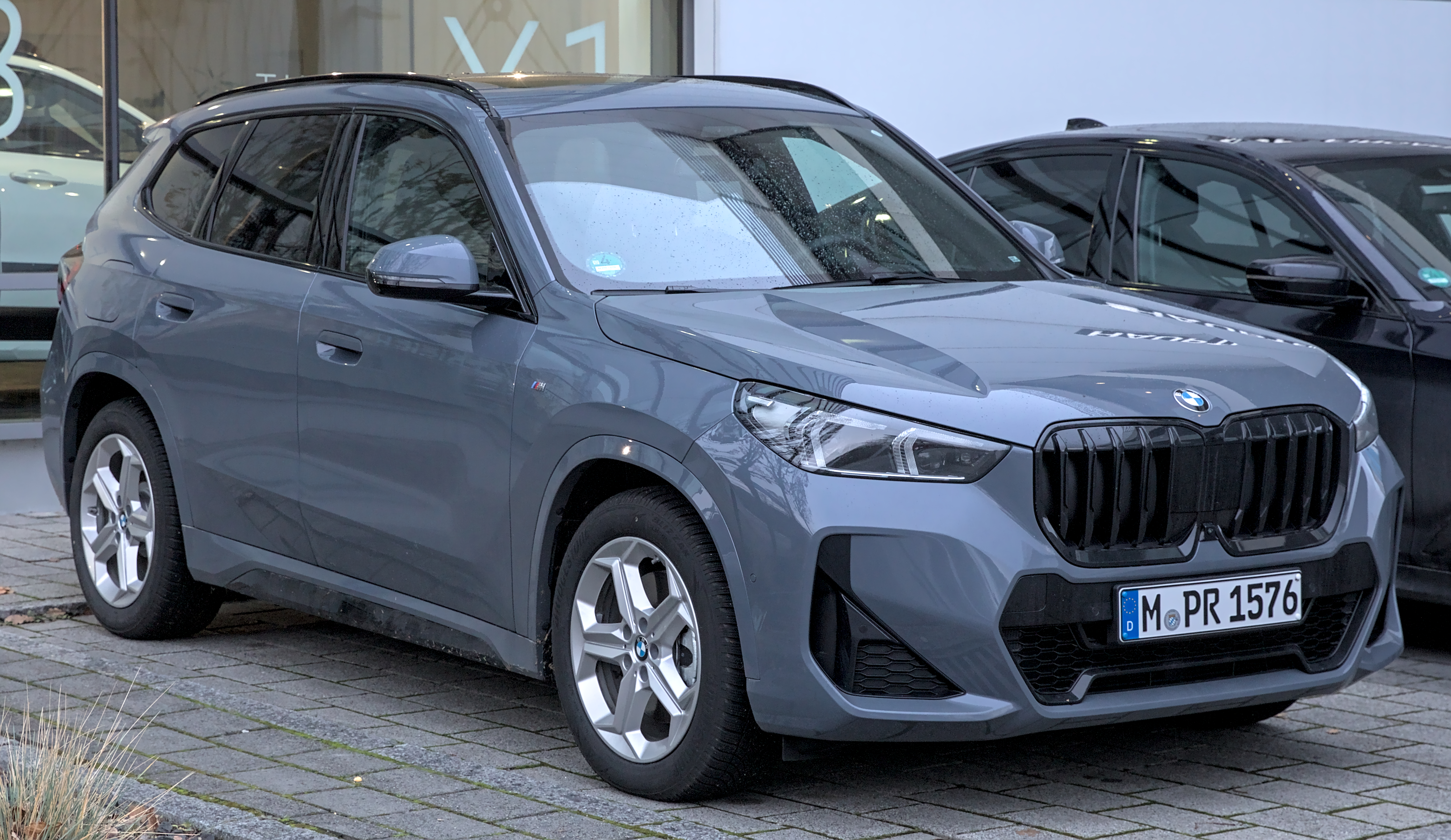
BMW X1 (E84/F48/U11)

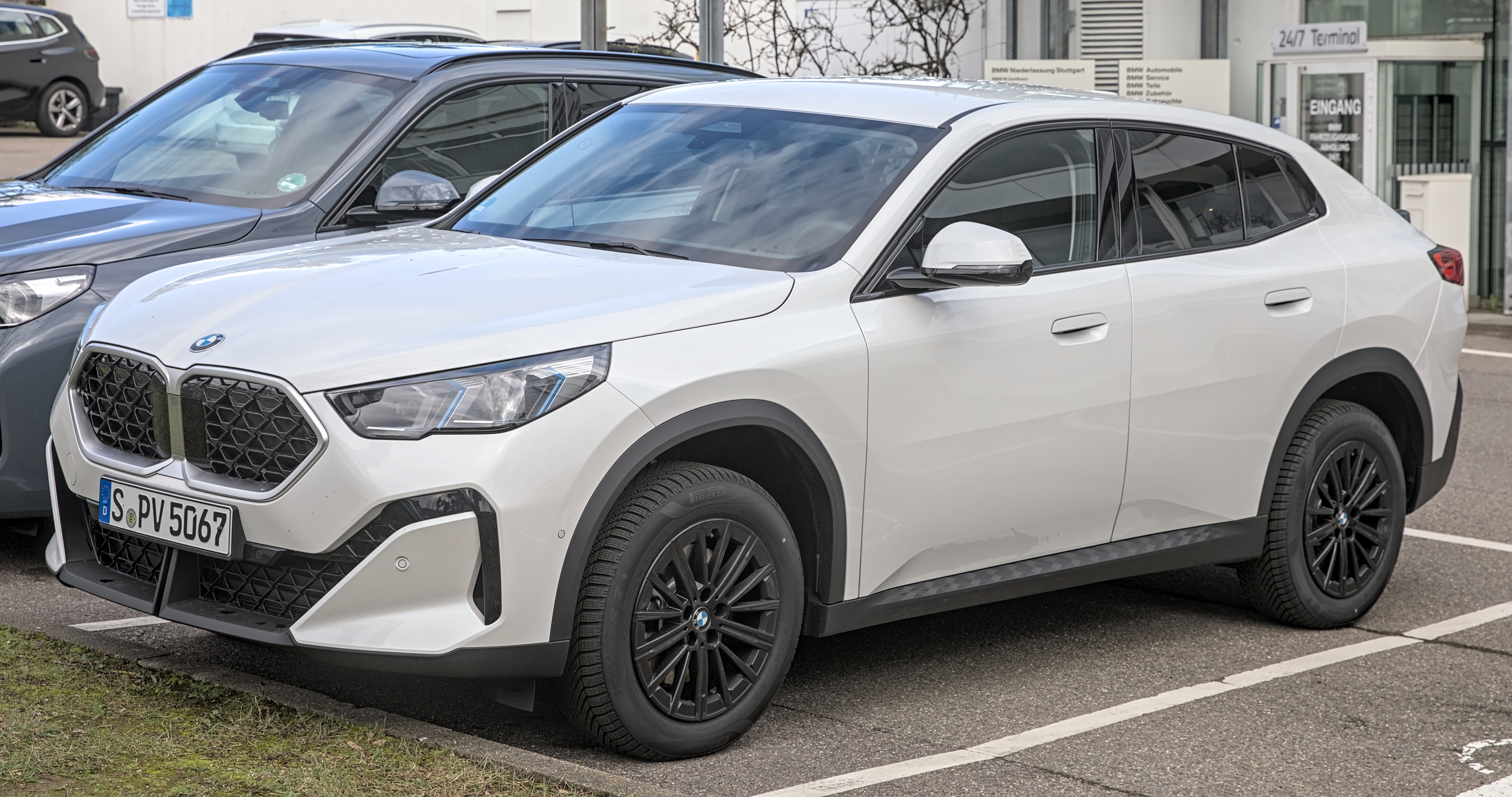
BMW X2 (F39/U10)

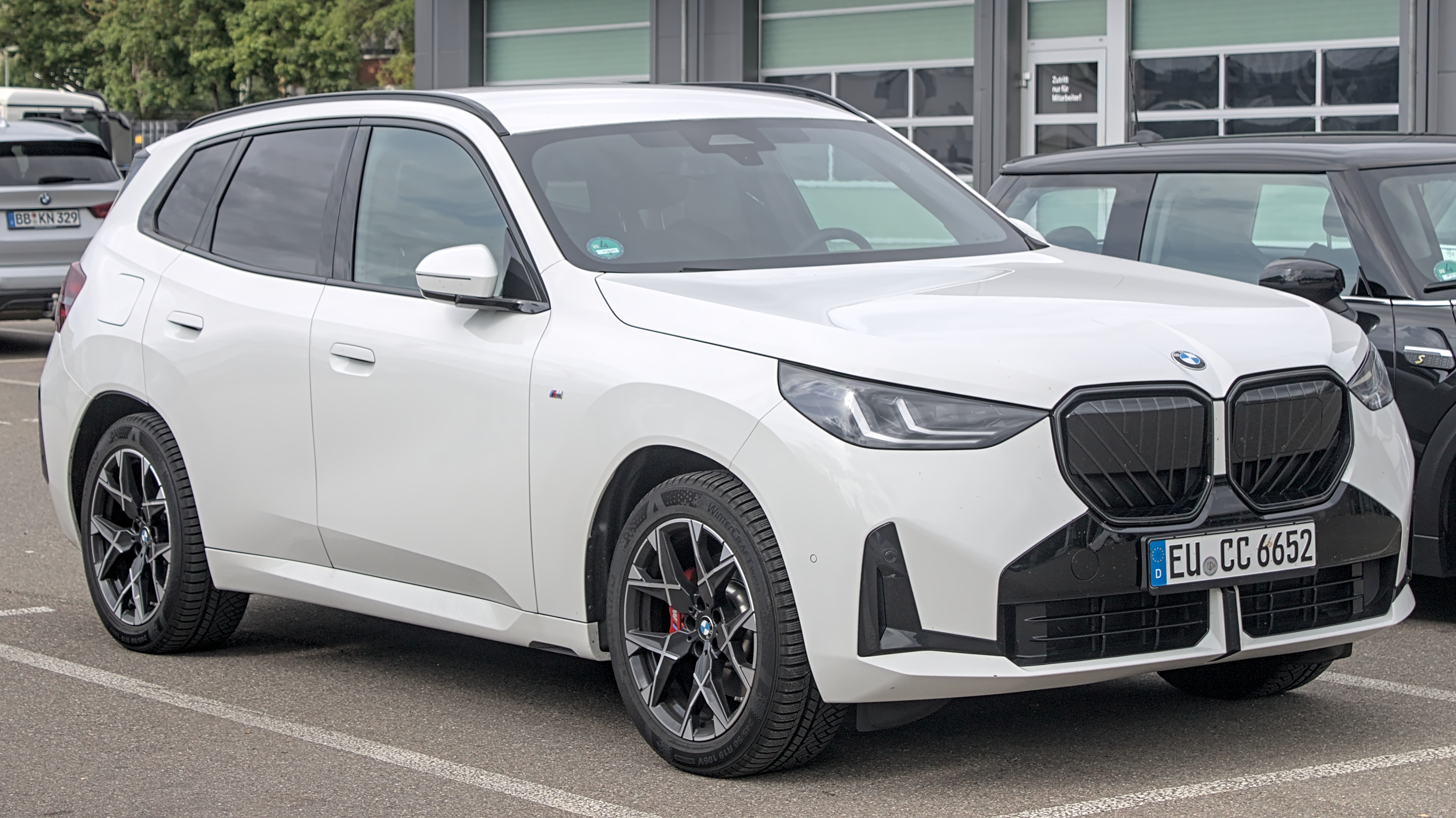
BMW X3 (E83/F25/G01/G45)

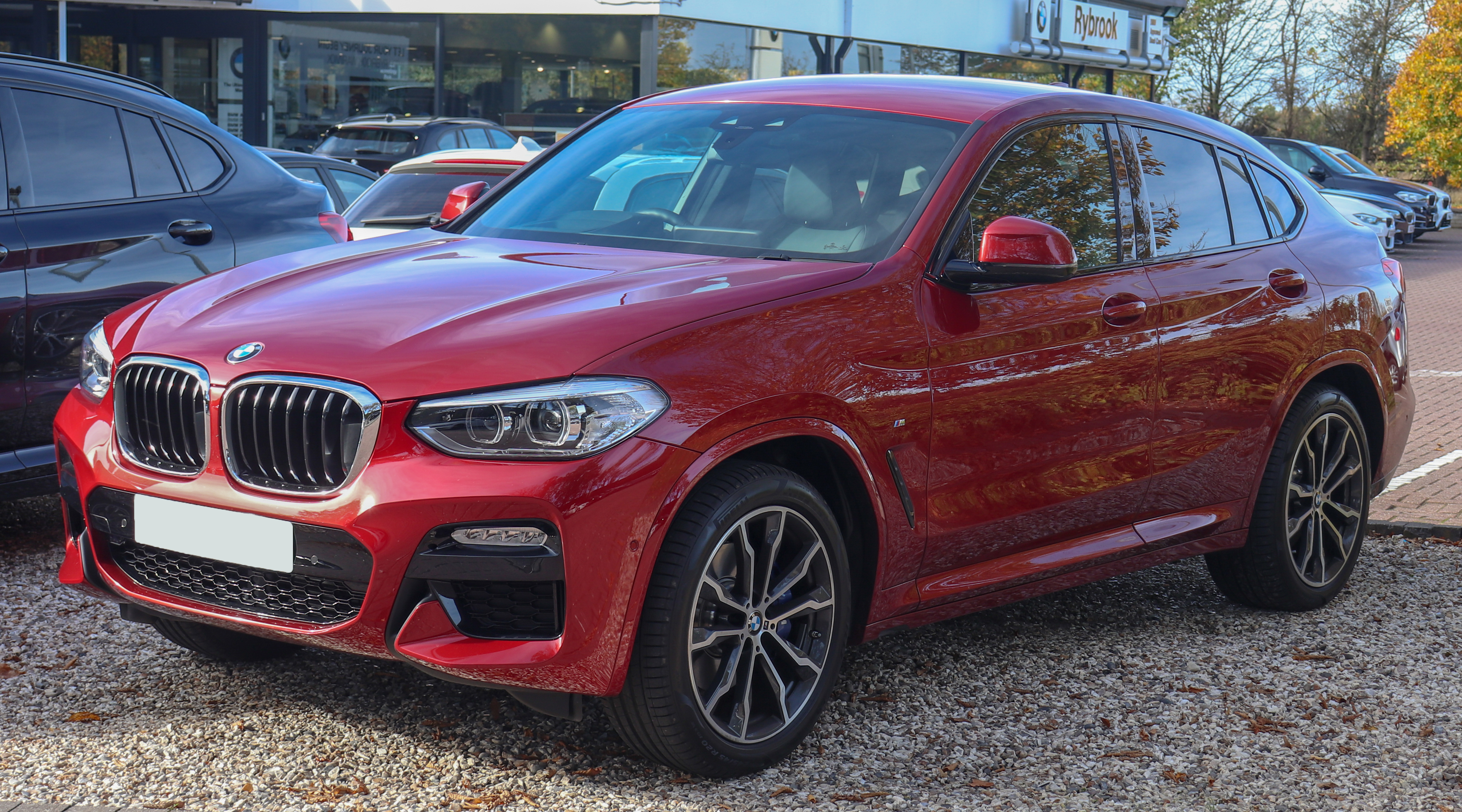
BMW X4 (F26/G02)

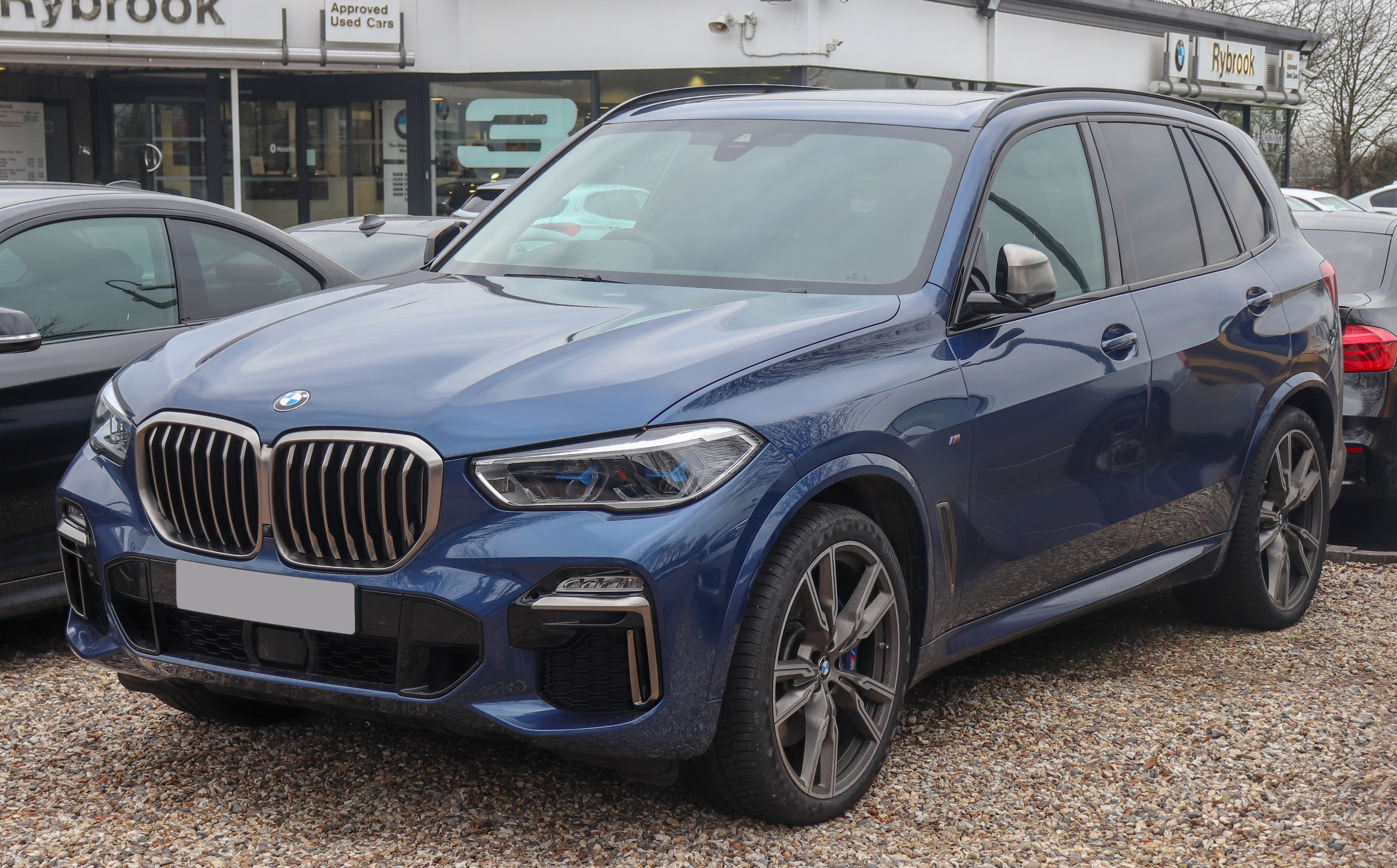
BMW X5 (E53/E70/F15/G05/G65)

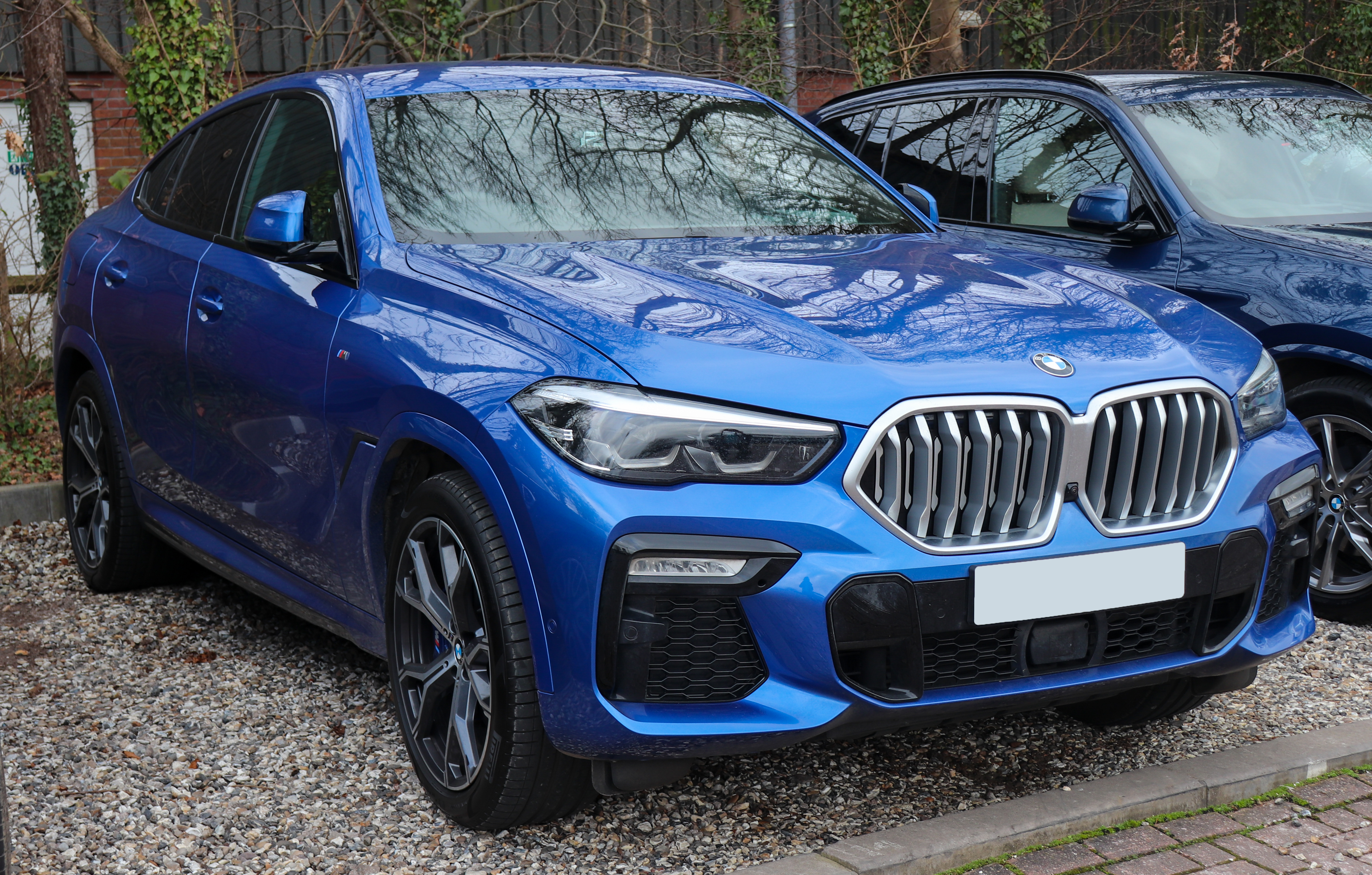
BMW X6 (E71/F16/G06)

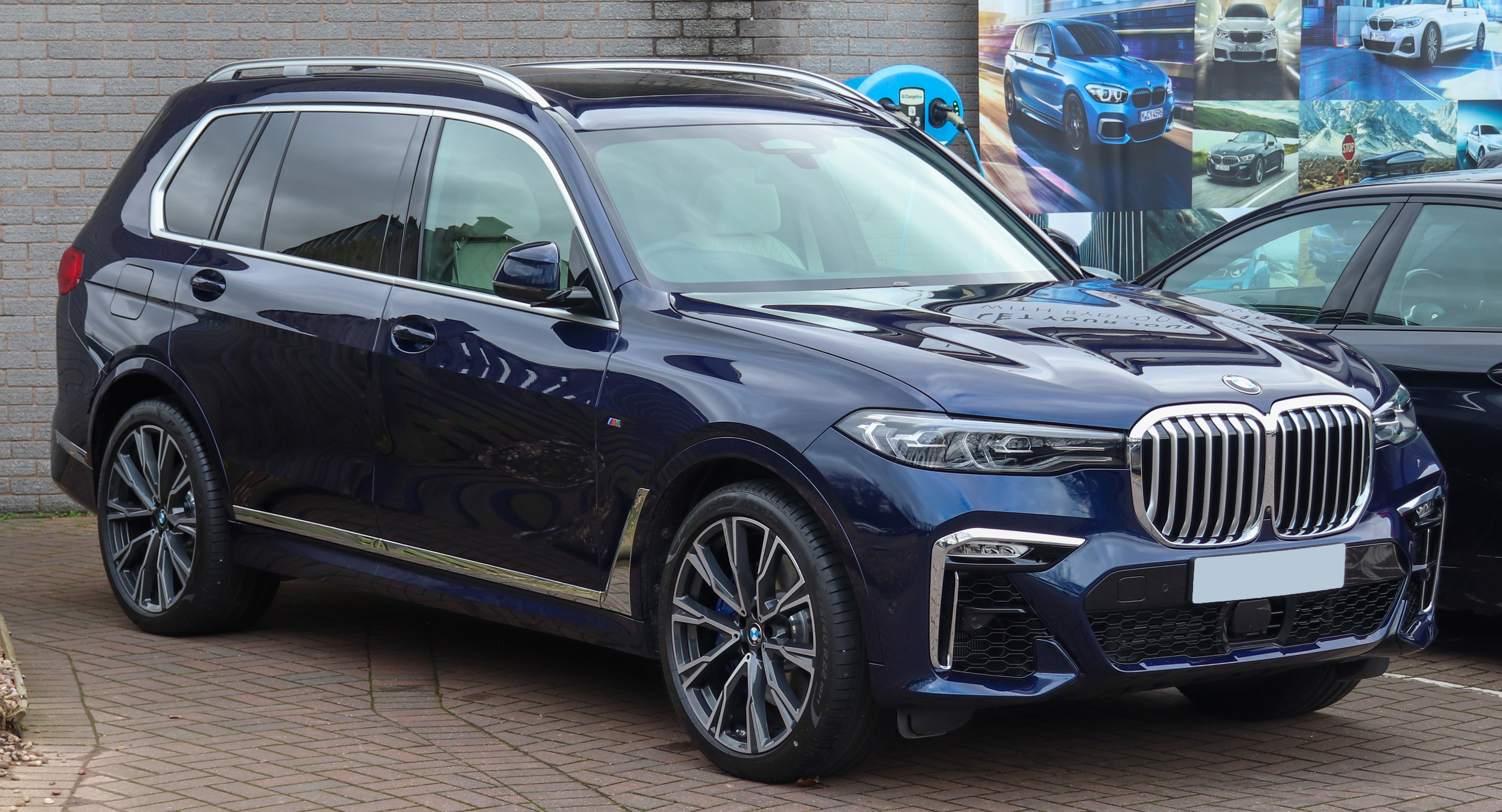
BMW X7 (G07)

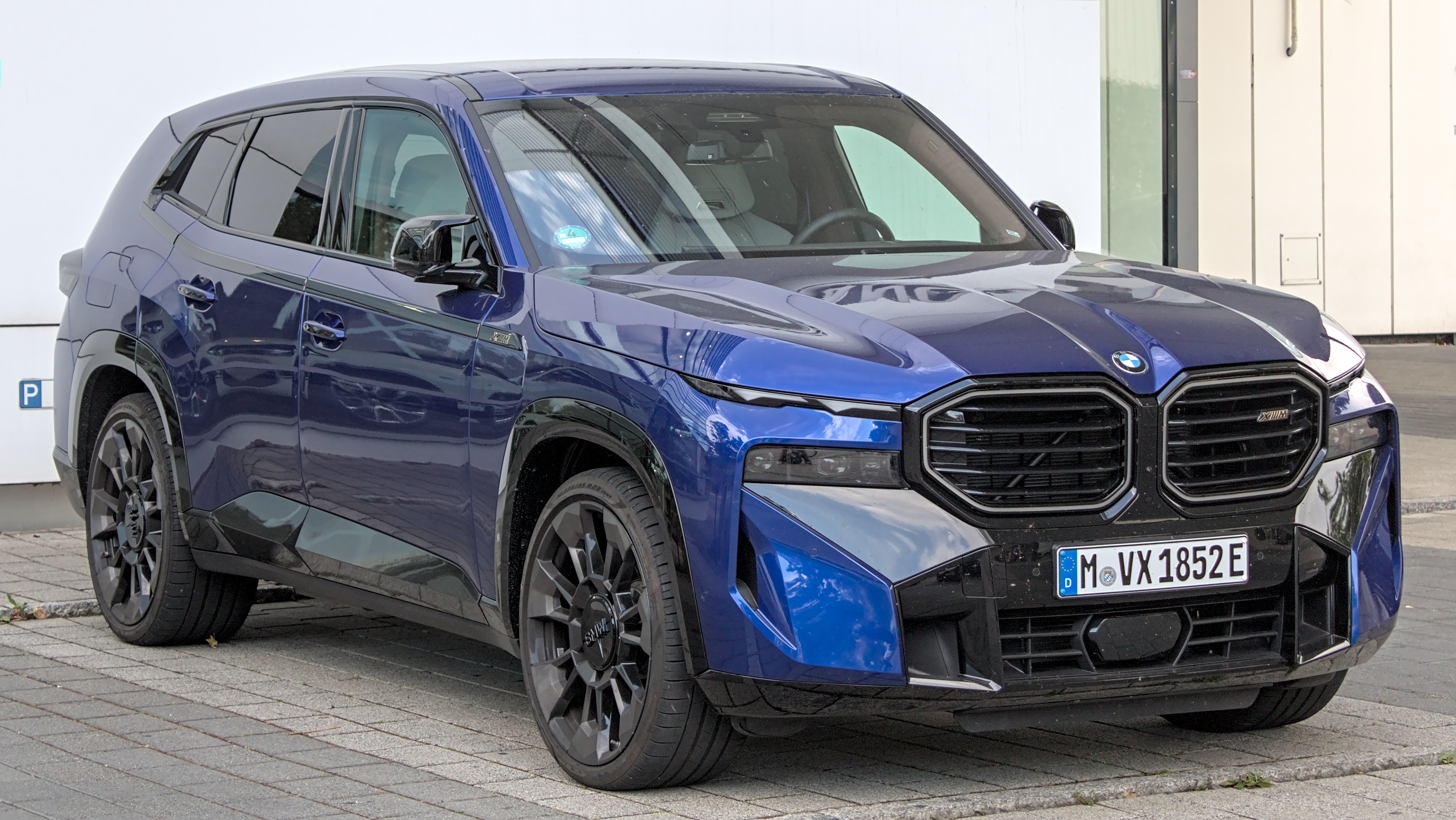
BMW XM (G09)

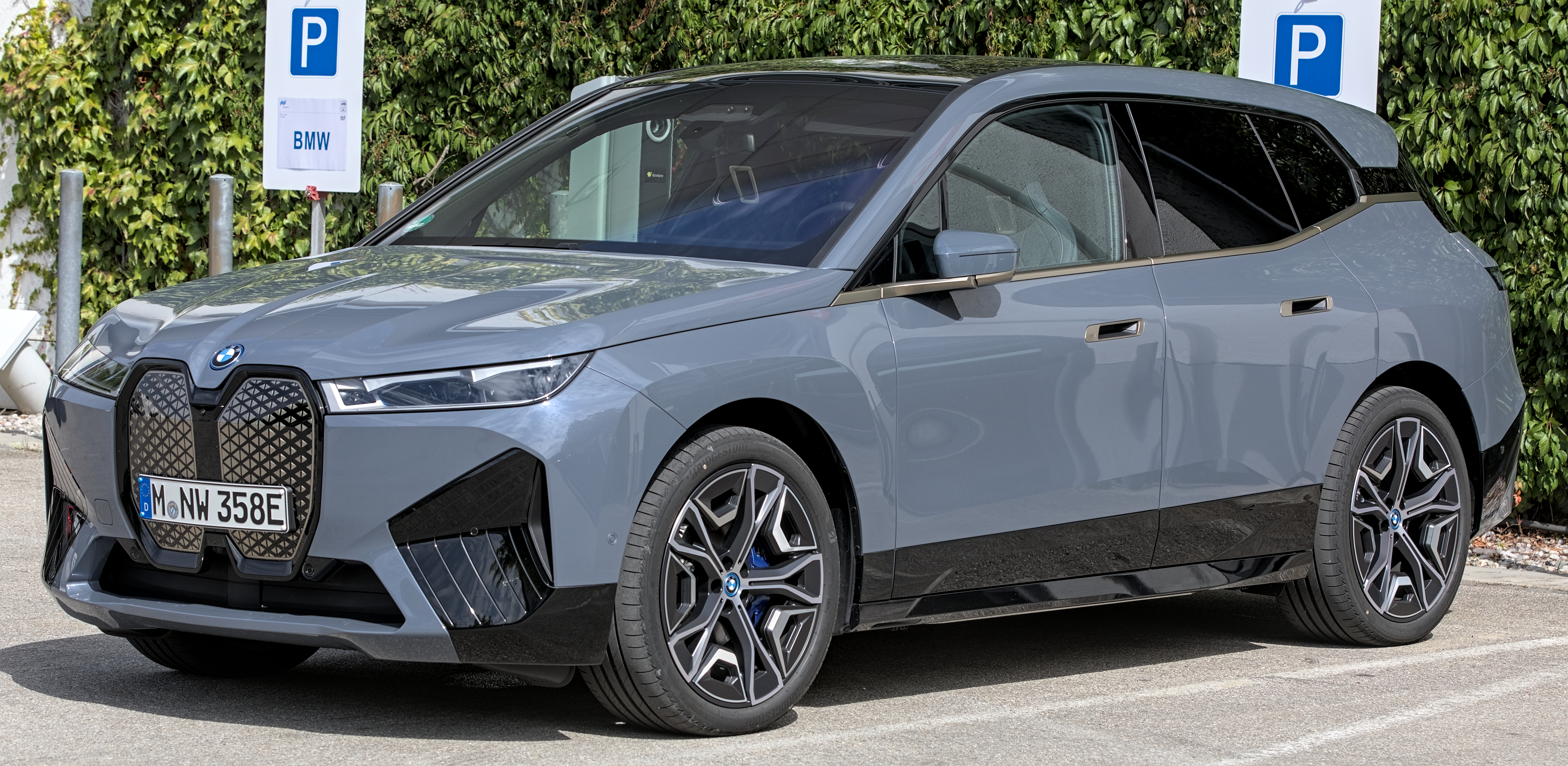
BMW iX (I20)

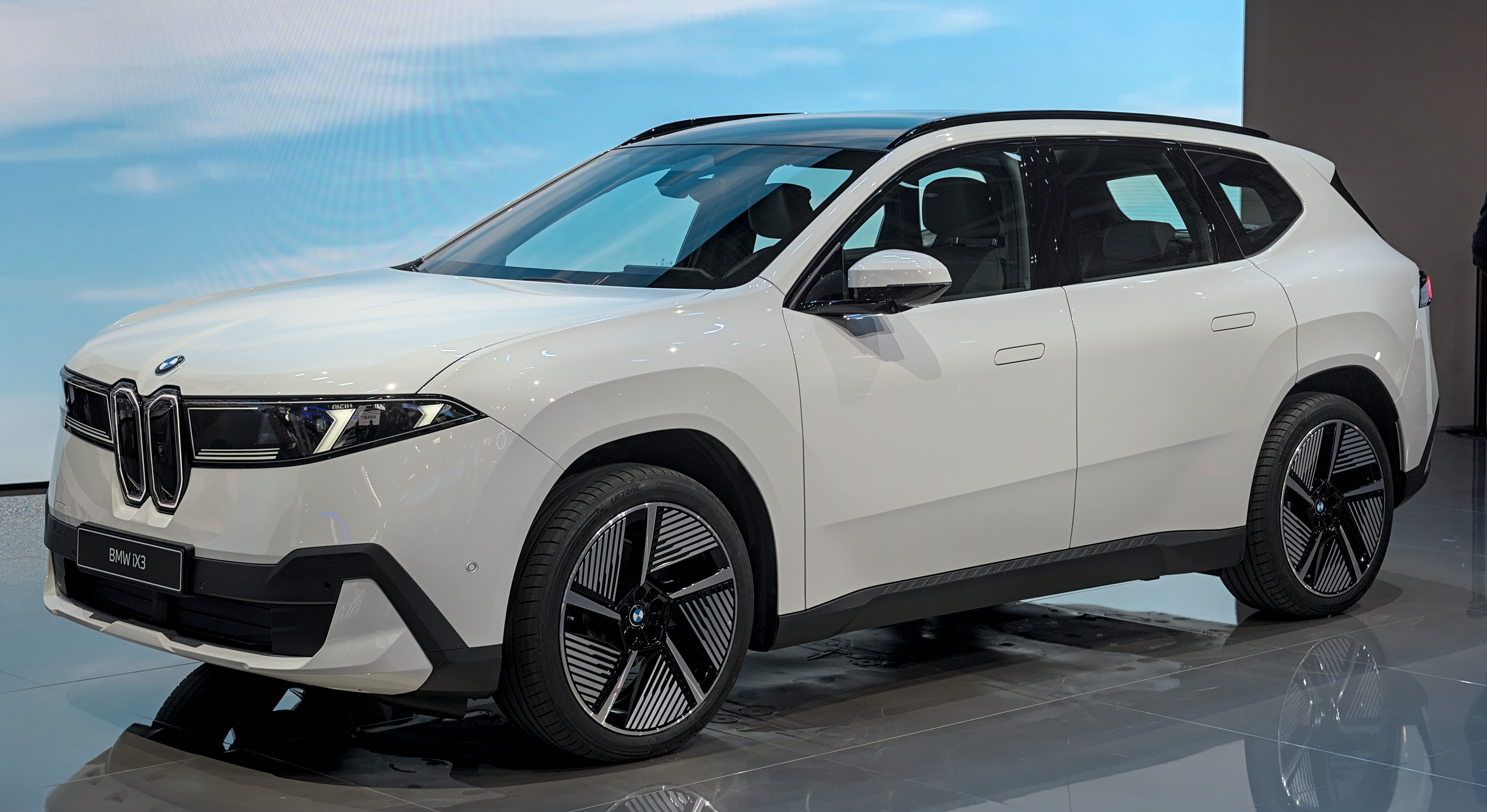
BMW iX3 (G08/NA5)
