= BMW Mexico =

Automobile company

Bayerische Motoren Werke México S.A. de C.V.
- Type: Private
- Founded: 1994; 32 years ago
- Headquarters: Toluca, Mexico (Production); Mexico City, Mexico (Headquarters)
- Products: Automobiles, Engines, Motorcycles
- Website: www.bmw.com.mx

BMW Mexico, full name: Bayerische Motoren Werke de México S.A. de C.V., is the independent Mexican owned subsidiary of German Bayerische Motoren Werke AG, headquartered in Mexico City, Mexico. It is a private Mexican owned branch of the German-based BMW AG.

== Factory ==
BMW de Mexico has two production facilities in Lerma, Toluca, Mexico State. In one, the company manufactures BMW motorcycles, and in the second, the company manufactured the BMW 3 series and BMW 5 series. ending in 2003 when BMW de Mexico ended local assembly. BMW de Mexico was initially set up in 1994 as a joint venture between BMW AG of Germany and a group of Mexican investors to manufacture BMW 3 series vehicles for the local Mexican market as Mexican law at the time required all vehicles sold in the country to be assembled locally. Initially only the 3 series vehicles were manufactured by the joint venture from kits using both Mexican and German components while other vehicles simply used entire kits shipped from Germany. By 1996 all models had begun to use at least 50% Mexican components as Mexican law dictated.

Mexican built BMW's used Mexican parts, and the Mexican suppliers of BMW de Mexico now supply parts for BMWs sold in the mainstream international market. In 2010, BMW AG of Germany announced plans to invest US$1 billion into Mexican auto parts suppliers to increase the supply of Mexican built parts and increase the overall percentage of Mexican components in BMW vehicles. In 2012 BMW revealed plans to build a new plant in Mexico.

BMW de Mexico manufactures armored high security vehicles, manufactures parts for domestic and foreign markets, maintains a large repair and service facility and a school for international BMW personnel. In 2001 the Italian government purchased 30 armored BMW sedans for the Italian national police from BMW de Mexico.

== See also ==
- BMW Group Classic
