= Avtotor =

Automobile manufacturer in Russia

- Type: Public company
- Industry: Automotive
- Founded: 1996
- Founders: Vladimir Alekseyevich Scherbakov
- Headquarters: Kaliningrad, Russia
- Products: Cars
- Revenue: $689 million (2017)
- Net income: 208,000,000,000 Russian ruble
- Number of employees: 2,100 (2015)
- Website: avtotor.ru

Avtotor (Russian: Автотор) is a automobile manufacturing company located in Kaliningrad, in the semi-exclave of Kaliningrad Oblast, Russia. Established in 1996, the company operates as a contract assembler for a number of automobile manufacturers. The name of the company is a portmanteau of "auto" with the German word "tor", meaning "gate". As a result, the branding of the company reflects the brick gates of the city, and the cities status as a gateway between Russia and Europe.

In 2025, Avtotor produced more than 33,500 vehicles. The company produces vehicles predominantly from Chinese manufacturers such as BAIC, SWM, Rox Motor, GWM and Deepal as well as its own Amberavto, Ambertruck and Eonyx brands. The plant formerly partnered with firms including BMW, Kia, Hyundai, General Motors, Kaiyi and Forthing. In 2026, the company reported that it was further developing the production of electric and hybrid vehicles, expecting to produce up to 10,000 of the type by the end of the year.

The production of European and Korean vehicles was suspended in 2022 due to international sanctions as a result of the Russo-Ukrainian war. The production of unlicensed BMW vehicles reportedly continued at a limited rate, using remaining components.

== History ==
Avtotor was founded in 1996 by a group of investors led by then majority owner and chairman of the board of directors, Vladimir Alekseyevich Scherbakov (1950 or 1961–2017), a former Deputy Prime Minister of the USSR and Chairman of the State Committee for Labour and Social Problems.

With an investment of $130,000,000, an assembly plant was installed in an unoccupied shipyard in Kaliningrad, with an original plan to produce Nissan automobiles. The name of the company is a portmanteau of “auto” and the German word “Tor”, meaning “gate”. In 1997, the plant also began assembling Kia automobiles.

In the aftermath of the 1998 Russian financial crisis and the ensuing decline in automobile sales, the company found itself in a difficult financial position. To mitigate the consequences of the crisis, Avtotor changed its business model and secured a contract with BMW Automotive to become a licensed importer for the German automaker. The company later began a partnership with General Motors, starting full-scale assembly of the Chevrolet Lacetti.

According to Bild, Avtotor resumed assembling BMW X5, X6 and X7 sport utility vehicles earlier this year using stocks of components left over from 2022, when BMW halted its Russian operations after Moscow launched its full-scale invasion of Ukraine.

A BMW spokesperson told Ukrainian media outlet United24 that the production was being carried out on an irregular basis. The company said vehicles assembled since 2022 have not undergone BMW's quality control procedures or certification.

German automotive magazine Auto Motor und Sport reported that registrations of Russian-built BMW vehicles in Russia nearly tripled in 2025 compared with the previous year.

The publication said the newly assembled vehicles differ from their 2022 counterparts, including smaller air intakes. As stocks of original BMW components have dwindled, Avtotor has increasingly relied on locally produced parts such as hoses, body components and wiring harnesses.

The vehicles are also no longer connected to BMW's official digital systems, meaning some functions are unavailable, the report said.

== Production ==
=== Current ===
- BAIC X55 (2023–present)
- AmberAvto A5 (2024–present)
- BAIC BJ60 (2025–present)
- Deepal G318 (2025–present)
- Deepal S07 (2026–present)
- Changan CS35 Max (2026–present)
- Changan CS75 Plus (2026–present)
- Haval H9 (2026–present)
- Rox 01 (2026–present)

==== GWM ====
GWM Tank 300

- GWM Tank 300 (2026–present)
- GWM Tank 400 (2026–present)
- GWM Tank 500 (2026–present)

=== Past models ===
==== BAIC ====
- BAIC X7 (2023-2024)
- BAIC X35 (2023-2024)
- BAIC BJ40 (2023-2025)

==== BMW ====
BMW 3 Series (E46)

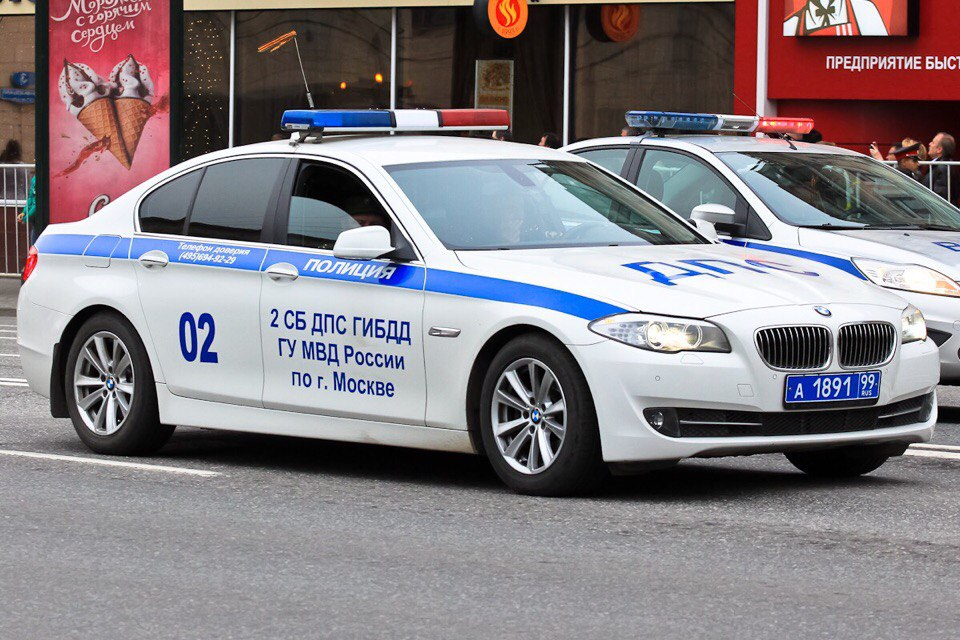
BMW 5 Series (F10)

BMW X5 (G05)

- BMW 7 Series (E38) (1999-2001)
- BMW 5 Series (E39) (1999-2004)
- BMW 3 Series (E46) (1999--2006)
- BMW 5 Series (E60) (2003-2010)
- BMW X5 (E70) (2009-2014)
- BMW X6 (E71) (2009-2014)
- BMW X3 (E83) (2009-2010)
- BMW X1 (E84) (2010-2015)
- BMW 3 Series (E90) (2004-2013)
- BMW 7 Series (F01) (2008-2015)
- BMW 5 Series (F10) (2009-2016)
- BMW X5 (F15) (2013-2018)
- BMW X6 (F16) (2014-2019)
- BMW 3 Series (F30) (2011-2018)
- BMW X3 (F25) (2010-2017)
- BMW X4 (F26) (2014-2018)
- BMW X1 (F48) (2015-2022)
- BMW X3 (G01) (2017-2022)
- BMW X4 (G02) (2018-2022)
- BMW X5 (G05) (2018-2022)
- BMW X6 (G06) (2019-2022)
- BMW X7 (G07) (2018-2022)
- BMW 5 Series (G30) (2017-2022)
- BMW 6 Series (G32) (2017-2022)

==== Forthing ====
- Forthing T5 (2024-2025)
- Forthing T5 Evo (2024-2025)
- Forthing Yacht (2024-2025)

==== Hummer ====
Hummer H3

- Hummer H2 (2004-2009)
- Hummer H3 (2006-2009)

==== Kaiyi ====
- Kaiyi E5 (2023-2025)
- Kaiyi X3 (2023-2025)
- Kaiyi X7 (2023-2025)

==== SWM ====
- SWM G01 (2023-2025)
- SWM G05 (2023-2025)

== Cooperations ==
=== Dongfeng Motor Corporation ===
In September 2022, the company began the production of the commercial vehicle Dongfeng truck, with a capacity up to 3.5 tonnes, and in 2023, of the trucks Dongfeng HD-170 and HD-120. In March 2023, the company started the assembly of the Dongfeng van, and in July 2023, of Dongfeng Passenger car. In October 2024, the Dongfeng Bus was added to the line-up.

=== Jiangling Motors ===
JMC was the initial licensor for Avtotor's manufacturing, and the plant has produced more than 240,000 vehicles for JMC.

Among the models produced at Kaliningrad are JMC Trucks

In February 2024, Avtotor started production on the Amberavto A5.

=== NAC ===
In June 2005, Avtovar collaborated with NAVECO, part of the Nanjing Automobile Corporation, to produce Avtotor-Trucks starting with the Yuejin line up, a broad range of low-bed delivery trucks with a payload of 0.8 tonnes to 24 tonnes.

== Former cooperations ==
=== BMW ===
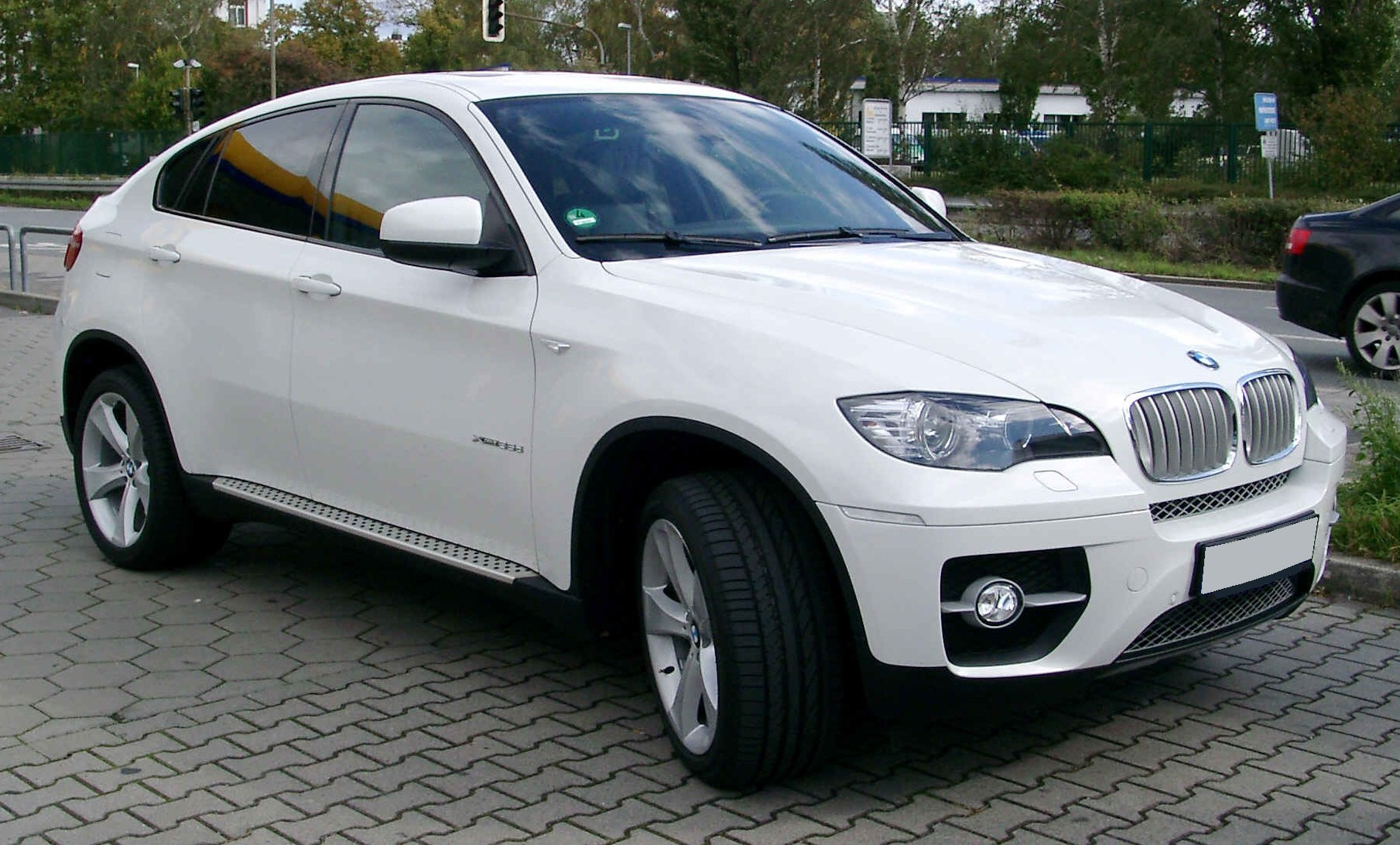
BMW X6

Production of BMW vehicles began in August 1999 with the BMW 5 Series (E39) and 7 Series. In the first year, Avtotor produced 555 cars. In March 2001, the factory began producing the BMW 3 Series (E46), and later, the new 5 Series (E60).

In July 2009, Avtotor increased the capacity of the plant and began production of the crossovers BMW X5 and X6. At the end of May 2010, the company announced the start of assembly on the new BMW 5 Series (F10) for the Russian market from kits received from Germany.

The BMW line-up produced in Kaliningrad has expanded over time with the following models: E65/66 (7 Series), F01/F02 (7 Series), E90 (3 Series), E70 (X5), E71 (X6), E83 (X3) and E84 (X1).

In May 2015, BMW released a statement postponing the decision to invest in another plant in Russia due to economic uncertainty in the country. There have been rumors in the media about the quality of Russian made BMWs. These vehicles also did not have factory and manufacturer warranties, unlike their German-made counterparts.

=== Chery Automobile ===
Chery car assembly in the Kaliningrad factory began in 2006. Chery car sales began in Russia in May 2006.

In the first six months of 2007, 18,558 vehicles were sold (of which Amulet - 10,119, Tiggo - 4,986, Fora - 2,596, QQ - 825, Oriental Son - 32), allowing Chery to take 12th place in the overall ranking in terms of sales in Russia. In 2007, in Russia, it sold 37,120 Chery cars. The factory produced 40,000 Chery cars that same year from semi-knocked-down kits.

In March 2008, Avtotor stopped assembling cars for Chery. The main cause being the fear that the government would deprive the factory of its privileges enjoyed under the Special Economic Zone, such as duty-free import of components.

=== General Motors ===
In August 2003, Avtotor and General Motors signed a set of agreements on the organization of production of GM vehicles at the Kaliningrad plant.

In August 2004, the Kaliningrad plant started production of the Chevrolet TrailBlazer and Chevrolet Tahoe, and in October 2004, of the Hummer H2.

In July 2005, the Cadillac CTS, SRX and STS joined them.

On 21 November 2008, production of the Chevrolet Lacetti began in full cycle, including welding and painting. This investment in the organization of the production on the part of GM in Avtotor amounted to 80 million euros.

The other models produced at the Kaliningrad plant included the Cadillac Escalade, the Chevrolet Aveo, Epica, Malibu, Orlando, Captiva, and the Opel Astra, Zafira, Meriva, Insignia, Mokka, and Antara.

Since the existence of the project, Avtotor has produced over 362,000 cars for GM's brands. General Motors discontinued its partnership with Avtotor in 2015, citing poor economic outlook in the country.

=== Hyundai Motor Company ===
In September 2012, the company began the production of the commercial vehicle Hyundai HD-78, with a capacity up to 3.5 tonnes, and in 2013, of the trucks Hyundai HD-170 and HD-120.[9] In March 2013, the company started the assembly of the Hyundai i40 sedan and wagon, and in July 2013, of the brand's flagship, the Hyundai Equus.[10] In October 2015, the Hyundai Elantra was added to the line-up.[11]

=== Kia Motors ===
Kia was the initial licensor for Avtotor's manufacturing, and the plant has produced more than 240,000 vehicles for Kia.[12]

Among the models produced at the Avtotor plant are the Clarus, Rocsta, Avella, Besta, Pregio, Carnival I, Carnival II, Carnival IV, Rio I, Rio II, Opirus I, Opirus II, Magentis I, Magentis II, Carens I, Carens II, Sportage I, Sportage II, Sportage III, Ceed, Soul, and Mohave.[12]

In February 2016, Avtotor started production on the Kia Optima.

== Awards and recognition ==
- In 2006, Avtotor was ranked 69th in Forbes magazine's list of the 200 largest private companies in Russia

== Controversy ==
- In 2012, Avtotor formed a partnership with Magna International, a Canadian auto-parts company. Vladimir Shcherbakov released a statement that the Canadian government had pressured Magna International into ending the partnership. A spokesperson for Magna denied the allegations.
