= RCI Banque =

France-based finance company

RCI Banque S.A.
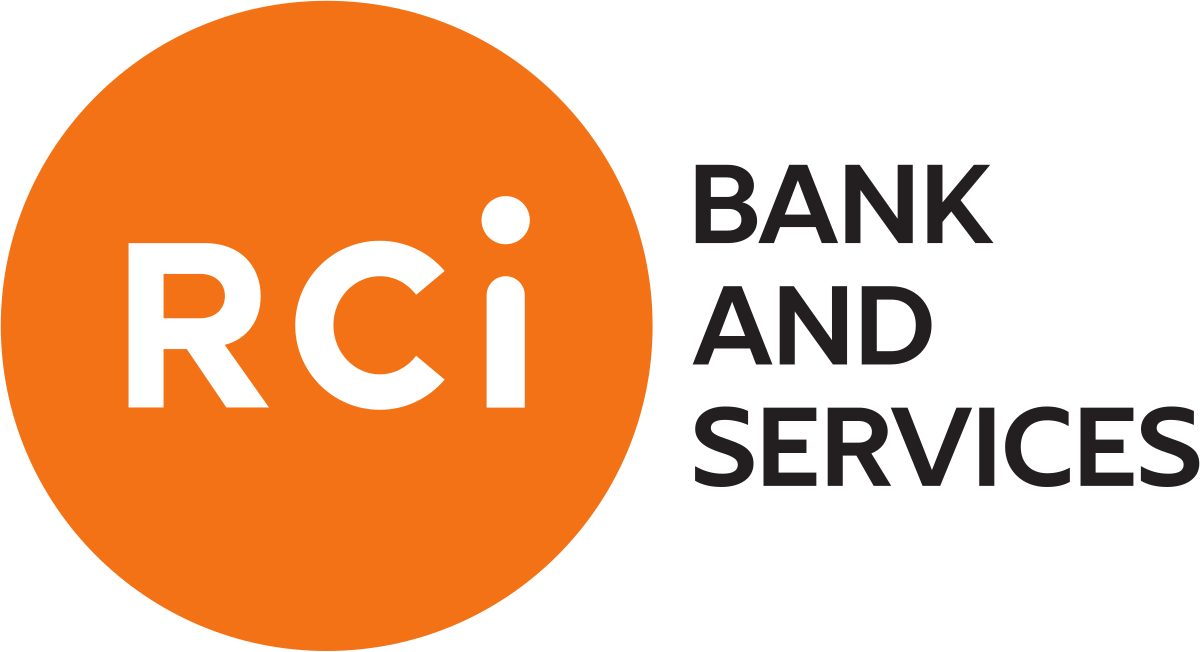
- Trade name: Mobilize Financial Services
- Type: Société Anonyme
- Industry: Automotive financing, insurance and related services
- Founded: 21 August 1974
- Headquarters: Paris, France
- Area served: Worldwide
- Key people: João Miguel Leandro (CEO); Clotilde Delbos (President of the Board)
- Operating income: ▲€1.327 billion (2019)
- Net income: ▲€903 million (2019)
- Total assets: ▲€58.080 billion (end 2019)
- Total equity: ▲€5.7 billion (end 2019)
- Number of employees: 3,700 (2020)
- Parent: Renault
- Website: mobilize-fs.com/en

RCI Banque SA (French pronunciation: [ɛʁ se i bɑ̃k]), trading as Mobilize Financial Services, is a France-based international company that is a wholly owned subsidiary of Renault and part of Renault's Mobilize unit. RCI Banque specialises in automotive financing, insurance, and related activities for the Renault group brands (Renault, Dacia, Mobilize and Alpine) globally for the Nissan group brands (Nissan, Infiniti) in Europe, Russia, Asia and South America; and for Mitsubishi Motors in the Netherlands.

RCI Banque has been designated in 2015 as a Significant Institution under the criteria of European Banking Supervision, and as a consequence is directly supervised by the European Central Bank.

== History ==
The company was founded by Renault in 1974 as the Société Financière de Renault or Sofiren, being intended as a way of financing sales for its dealerships and to manage the automaker's cash flow in Europe. On 27 June 1980 it was renamed Renault Crédit International (RCI). In 1990, it merged with Diac (Diffusion Industrielle et Automobile par le Crédit) SA, a company formed in 1924 by Louis Renault as a result of the lack of liquid funds after the 1921 crisis and with similar objectives, but focused exclusively on loans for the purchase of vehicles (today Diac operates as a RCI Banque's wholly owned subsidiary). By 1990, it contributed with more than one-third of Renault group's net income. By the end of 1999, after the establishment of the Renault–Nissan Alliance, the firm acquired the five Nissan's financial affiliates in Europe (located in the United Kingdom, the Netherlands, Italy, Germany and Spain) for €294 million and expanded its presence in South and Central America to finance Renault and Nissan sales. In November 2001, the company was named RCI Banque. In February 2016, as part of a corporate image revamp, RCI Banque adopted the trade name RCI Bank and Services.

In January 2017 the company became the majority shareholder of fr:Karhoo, a taxi platform. In September 2017, it acquired Class and Co, the parent company of Yuso (an automated fleet management system for taxi, ride-hailing and delivery services) and Marcel (a platform for reserving ride-hailing services in the Paris metropolitan area). On 8 June 2018, it acquired a 75% majority interest in iCabbi, a dispatch management company for automotive fleets of taxis and PHVs.

In January 2018, the firm moved its headquarters from Noisy-le-Roi to the 2nd arrondissement of Paris. The Noisy-le-Roi headquarters were kept by the subsidiary Diac. In February 2018, the firm's affiliate in the Netherlands announced it would finance Mitsubishi Motors sales in the country through a partnership with the local Mitsubishi financial affiliate. In May 2022, RCI Bank and Services changed its trade name to Mobilize Financial Services, as it was made part of Renault's Mobilize unit. Mobilize Financial Services launched Mobilize Insurance, a subsidiary offering "usage-based" insurance plans, and a payment card to finance new mobility offers. At the end of 2022, the group launched the long-term rental company Mobilize Lease&Co, which made its first two acquisitions in Germany in July 2023.

== Activities ==
Mobilize Financial Services offers automobile financing lines (17.8 billion euros of new financing at the end of 2020, 4.6 million service contracts sold at the end of 2020 including insurance products). New financing contracts rose to €17.8 billion in 2020. The volume of services sold came to 4.6 million contracts.

In 2020, the firm recorded 1,520,330 contracts financed, generating new financings of €17.8 billion. It offers related services, including car loans (used and brand-new), electric vehicle battery leasing contract (100,000 contract in March 2017), rentals with purchasing options, leases, long-term rentals for retail customers and services, such as maintenance, extended warranties, roadside assistance, fleet management, and credit cards.

It also finances new vehicles, used vehicles, and spare parts, as well as short-term cash requirements for the Renault–Nissan–Mitsubishi Alliance dealerships. It has subsidiaries in Argentina, Brazil, Colombia, Algeria, Morocco, Ukraine, South Korea, and the European Union and joint-ventures in Russia, Turkey and India.

The firm has developed online vehicle sales. In Brazil, 20% of the Renault KWID models sold in 2018 were booked online using RCI e-payment. Dacia customers in the United Kingdom have been able to finance and pay off the model of their choice entirely online since November 2018 via the Dacia Buy Online website. It is the first time that a fully digitalized customer experience has been proposed in the British market.

In 2020, it sold 1.8 services per vehicle registered by the Alliance brands in its operating scope. The firm is one of the largest issuers of auto loan asset-backed securities in Europe. In 2004, it had, together with the PSA Banque, a 10 percent participation, only behind Volkswagen and Fiat banks.

=== Savings ===
In February 2012, RCI Banque launched the ZESTO savings accounts, which were opened to a general clientele. This internet-based operation was the first of its type by an automaker's subsidiary in France. The launch was accompanied by a TV commercial from Romain Kunstlinger. The success of this initiative led to other automotive groups operating in the French market, as PSA Peugeot Citroën, to consider launching similar projects. At the end of 2012, RCI Banque announced plans to extend ZESTO to Germany. The German version of ZESTO was launched in 2013, called RCI Bank Direkt. In January 2014, ZESTO-Bank Direkt had over 136,000 customers.

RCI Bank and Services launched its deposit collection business in Spain in November 2020. At end-December 2020, net collected deposits totaled €20.5 billion, or 43% of the company's assets. Deposits from retail customers in France, Germany, Austria, the United Kingdom, Brazil and Spain (savings books and term deposits) reached 20.5 billion euros at the end of December 2020 compared with 17.7 billion € at the end of December 2019 and representing nearly 43% of net assets at the end of December 2020.

=== UK subsidiary ===
In June 2015, RCI Banque's British subsidiary, RCI Bank UK, based in Rickmansworth, launched a savings account system in the United Kingdom, becoming the first car manufacturer-related financial company to do so.

In March 2019 it obtained a UK banking licence; in February 2017 it announced it had received more than £2.1billion of deposits from more than 60,000 savers in the UK since launching in June 2015. In 2017, RCI Bank was awarded as the "Best No Notice Account Provider" by the Moneyfacts Group.

=== Legal Complaints ===
In 2022, Mackie Motors (Brechin) Limited (MMBL), a Scottish car dealer, claimed that RCI Financial Services "unlawfully withdrew key financing and terminated contracts giving just seven days' notice in November 2021. The clam was eventually dismissed by the High Court, as was a subsequent appeal.

In June 2025, a new letter of claim was issued by MMBL to RCI Financial Services, Renault UK, and Nissan Motor (GB). The letter alleged that RCI, Renault, and Nissan "abruptly and simultaneously cut off access to essential operational systems [...] without warning or explanation. And that, "RCI Financial Services instigated this disruption by pressuring Renault and Nissan to terminate franchise agreements based on unverified internal concerns, without offering MMBL a chance to respond".

In December 2025, it was announced that Scottish National Party MP, Dave Doogan, will appear as a witness for Mackie Motors in the firm's upcoming claim involving RCI, Renault, and Nissan. In December 2024, Doogan met with RCI Financial Services's CEO to discuss the company's relationship with Mackie Motors and previously raised the case in parliament, saying, "sometimes crime wears a suit, as happened in Brechin in my constituency, where Mackie Motors had equity in their vehicles stolen by a French bank based in London. Then, through mendacity, or incompetence, or both, the bank turned off the oxygen for that business of 50 years."

In February 2026, a former employee of RCI alleged that the bank did not follow "proper procedures" and that the treatment of Mackie was "grossly unjust". The anonymous whistleblower accused RCI of being motivated by personal grievance and quoted senior management who discussed in private meetings their ambitions to "get this b*****d, Mackie". According to the whistleblower, meetings were held over the course of two months to ensure the process of removing Mackie Motors went smoothly.

In April 2026, RCI, along with Renault and Nissan, made a strikeout application to dismiss MMBL's claim, alleging Mackie Motors was attempting to re-litigate the same facts under new legal theories, and it was an "abuse of the court process".

In August 2026, the High Court rejected the strikeout application and ruled that MMBL's case could proceed. In a written judgement, Judge Lance Ashworth KC noted that the case was "not merely a repackaging of the same facts" and would focus on new evidence not previously available. He added that the inclusion of Renault and Nissan for the first time was a "powerful factor" in his decision to allow the case to proceed.

In September 2026, Judge Lance Ashworth KC rejected an application by RCI, Renault, and Nissan to appeal his August decision. Ashworth said their proposed appeal had "no realistic prospect of success" and ordered the three defendants to pay Mackie Motors £117,500 towards the legal costs of the failed application.

== Management ==
As of September 2019, the company is managed through an Executive Committee and a Board of Directors. Positions are as follows: João Miguel Leandro is Chief Executive Office, and Clotilde Delbos, Chairman of the Board).

== Sponsorship ==
RCI Banque's Diac sponsored the Renault Sport-assisted R5s and Clios of the Société Diac team, which competed in some events of the World Rally Championship and the French Rally Championship during the late 1980s and early 1990s.

On 24 March 2010, Diac and Renault F1 signed a sponsorship agreement which lasted from the Australian to the Monaco Grand Prix of that year. In 2017, the firm announced a new deal with the Renault F1 team from the Malaysian Grand Prix onwards.

== See also ==
- List of banks in France
- List of banks in the euro area
