= Mobilize (marque) =

Automobile brand

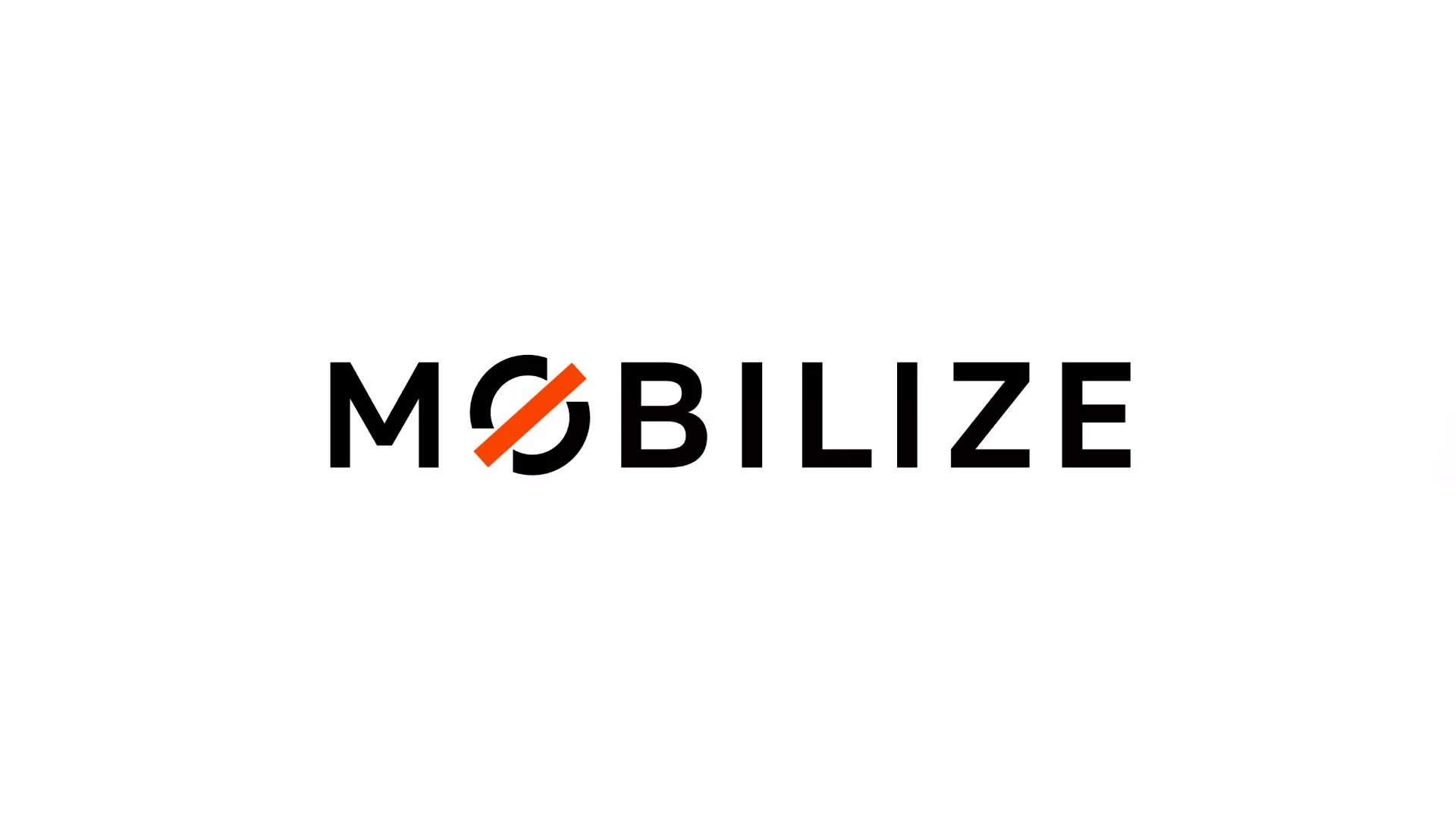
- Type: Brand, Business unit
- Industry: Automotive
- Predecessor: Renault's financing and mobility services operations
- Founded: January 2021; 5 years ago
- Area served: Europe
- Key people: Gianluca De Ficchy (CEO)
- Products: Cars
- Services: Financing, car-related services
- Parent: Renault Group
- Divisions: Mobilize Financial Services; Mobilize Beyond Automotive
- Website: www.mobilize.com/en/

Mobilize is a business unit of the French car manufacturer Renault established in 2021 and it is mainly specialized in mobility-related services. It focuses on subscription services, leasing, loans, data, and energy management, offering Mobilize-badged vehicles for car sharing and delivery services.

Mobilize is one of the four brands of the Renault Group, along with Renault, Dacia and Alpine.

Mobilize is available in France, Germany, Spain, United Kingdom, Italy, and Morocco.

Based on the premise that purchasing vehicles is no longer the preferred option of drivers, Mobilize aims to focus its offer on rental and car-sharing.

== History ==
The Mobilize business unit was created in January 2021 as part of a wider overhauling of Renault operations. The new unit was set to develop car sharing and other niche businesses. Mobilize was also aimed at meeting new mobility needs like car-sharing, last-mile delivery and on-demand transport. Created as part of Luca de Meo’s Renaulution plan, Mobilize specializes in mobility services: energy services, driving-related data analysis (like the identification of accident-prone areas, road analysis, traffic and pollution data etc...), financing and car manufacturing.

In January 2021, the unit launched the Mobilize vehicle marque by presenting Mobilize EZ-1 Prototype, a car-sharing prototype quadricycle. Later that year, Renault integrated its Zity electric car-sharing business into Mobilize, renaming it Zity by Mobilize. The first marketed car was the subscription-only Mobilize Limo (a rebadged JMEV Yi from JMEV), introduced in the second half of 2022. In May 2022, Renault's financial affiliate RCI Banque was made part of the unit, adopting the trade name Mobilize Financial Services.

In October 2022, Mobilize announced Mobilize Fast Charge, its EV fast-charging network, with plans for 200 chargers, primarily at Renault dealerships near major roadways, by mid-2024.

In July 2023, Mobilize Financial Services subsidiary, Mobilize Lease&co announced its acquisition of two German companies belonging to the MeinAuto Group, Mobility Concept and MeinAuto.

In August 2023, Mobilize acquired shares in Select Car Leasing, a UK-based leasing company.

== Operations ==
Mobilize provides cars for ride-sharing, taxi and delivery companies, while also offering car-related services (including subscriptions), financial services, and charging services. The unit does not produce vehicles but it gets them from other entities. The unit is divided into two major divisions: Mobilize Financial Services (car financing) and Mobilize Beyond Automotive (other activities).

== List of services ==
- Zity by Mobilize: car sharing service in Paris, Lyon, Madrid, Milan.
- Bipi: car subscription service.

== Vehicles and services ==
=== Vehicles ===
==== Mobilize Limo ====
In November 2023, Renault announced that the electric sedan, originally intended for cabs and VTCs, would not be marketed.

==== Mobilize Duo/ Bento ====
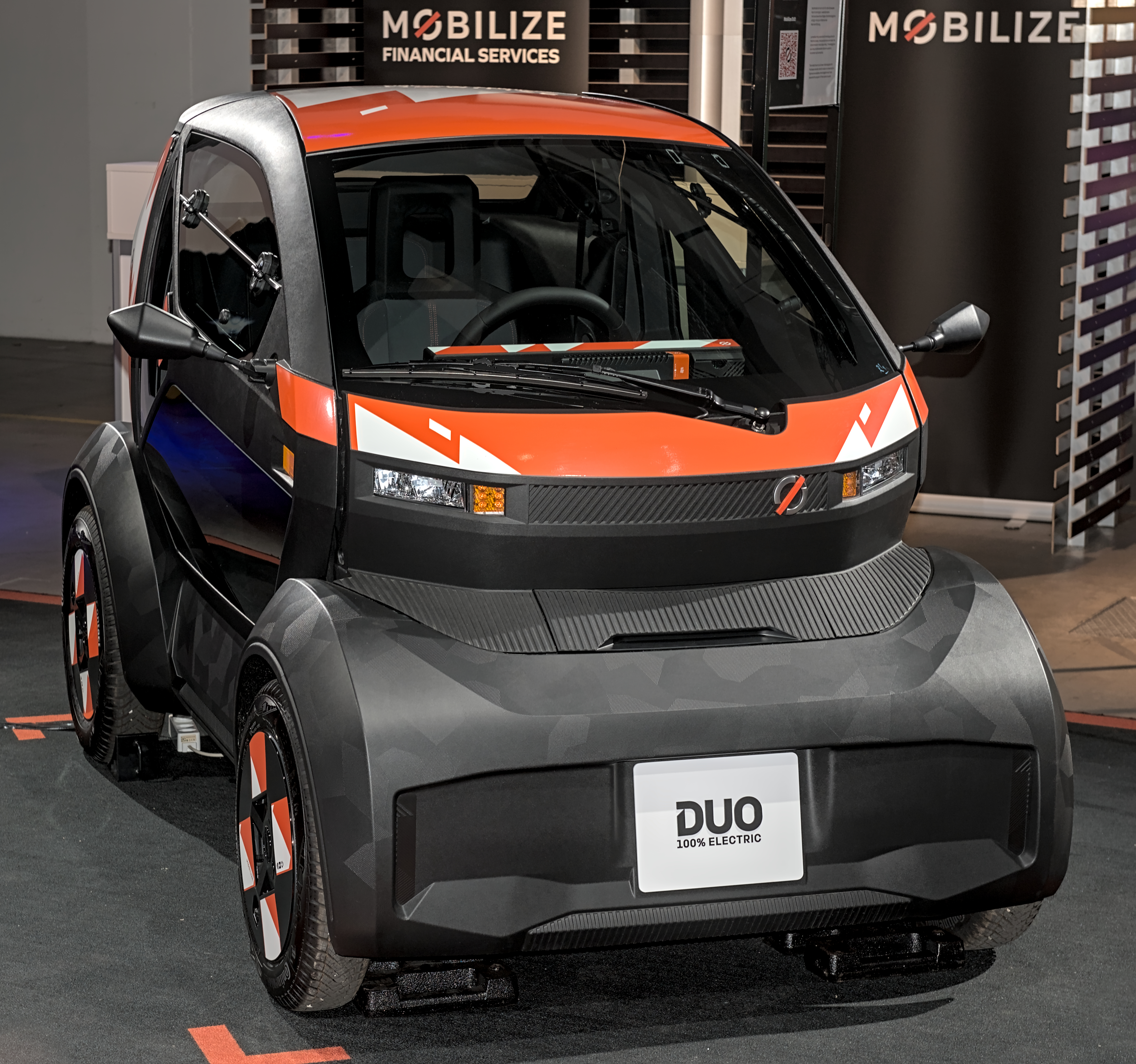
Mobilize Duo at Auto Zurich 2024

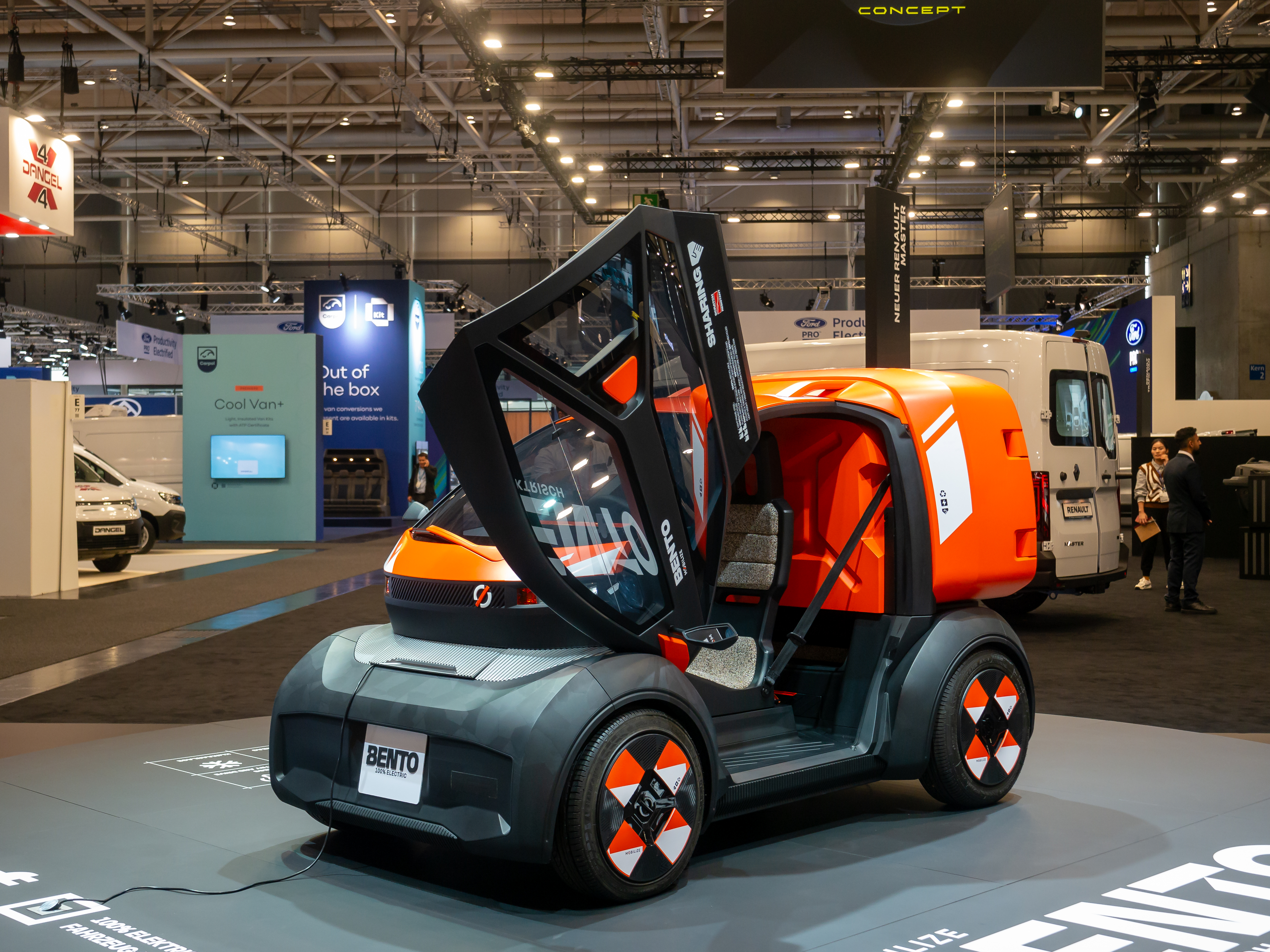
Mobilize Bento at IAA Transportation 2024

On 10 October 2022, Mobilize presented a set of concepts alongside the production version of the Duo and Bento models.

Mobilize Duo is regarded as the new Twizy. This model is available in two versions, 45 and 80, and it can carry two people.

Mobilize Bento is the utility version of Mobilize Duo. The launch of these two vehicles, Mobilize Bento and Mobilize Duo, is scheduled for 2024.

==== Mobilize Solo Concept ====
The idea for the Mobilize Solo came from Renault's design studio in India, starting from a skateboard with an umbrella, although the final concept is more like a chair in a cover. It measures 1,370 mm (54 in) long, 900 mm (35 in) wide and 1,750 mm (69 in) high. Inside there is room for one person in a semi-sitting position with a joystick instead of a steering wheel.

==== Mobilize Hippo ====
Mobilize Hippo is a utility vehicle for last-mile delivery. A prototype of Hippo was presented was first presented at the Viva Tech in 2021.

== Services ==
=== Mobilize Power Solutions ===
Formerly known as Elexent, Mobilize Power Solutions is the entity for electric recharging. The service is available in 11 countries.

=== Mobilize Vehicle-to-grid (V2G) Technology ===
In June 2023, Mobilize announced its Powerbox bidirectional charging station as part of the launch of the new Renault 5 electric. In 2024, the Renault 5 with Mobilize V2G technology will offer to save money by plugging in the car. The two-way system will transform the electric city car into an energy supplier.

With its V2G service, Mobilize functions as an energy supplier. The Mobilize V2G service saves money on home recharging and on the overall electricity bill, it also allows the electricity to be sold on the market.

=== Mobilize Fast Charge ===
In Octobre 2022, Mobilize announced its plans for a European fast-charging network by 2024.

=== Rental ===
Mobilize specializes in flexible rental formulas. À la carte rental is one of the options available.

=== Mobilize Share ===
Mobilize Share is Mobilize's car-sharing service, the first of its kind in France.

=== Zity ===
Zity is Mobilize's car-sharing subsidiary. In 2022, its sales amounted to 12 million euros.

=== Data-processing ===
Supported by Renault, Software Factory and other partners, Mobilize will also work to develop cutting-edge algorithms and data processing software for better forecasting of user demand and better vehicle dispatching.

=== Financial services ===
Mobilize Financial Services is Mobilize's unit devoted to financial services, which is already present worldwide. Among other things, it operates in partnership with Nissan. In March 2023, Mitsubishi chose Renault as its sole provider of financing services. Among the brands of Mobilize Financial Services, there is the long-term leasing service, Mobilize Lease&Co.
