= JMEV Yi =

Battery electric compact sedan

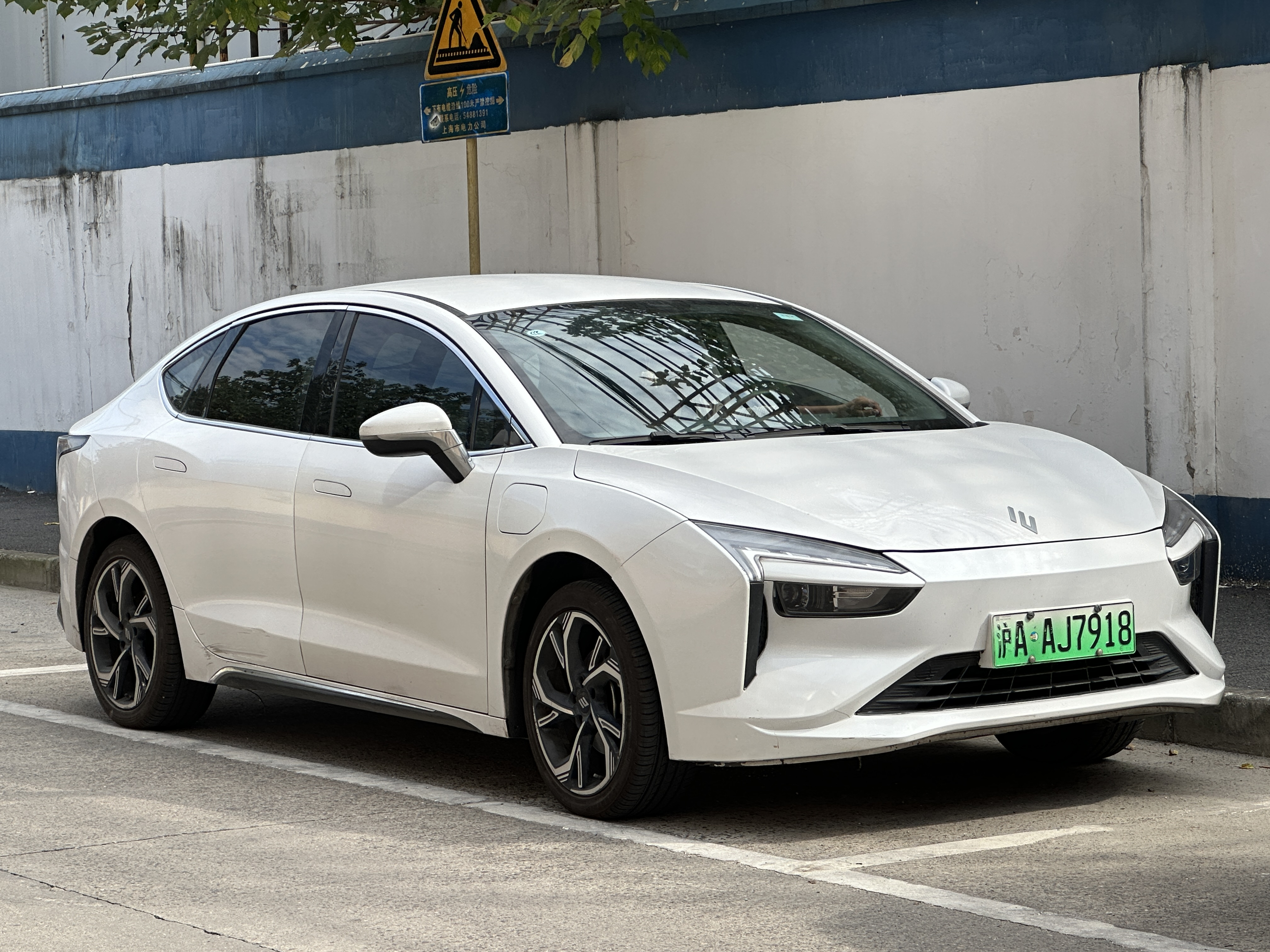

Overview
- Manufacturer: JMEV
- Also called: Mobilize Limo (Europe; 2022–2023); JMEV GSE (Mexico); Iran Khodro Luna GRE EV (Iran); AmberAvto A5 (Russia); EVEASY Limo (Israel); Nieve Evzoom (Turkey); JMEV Elight; Ezoom Yi; JMEV Yichi 05 (China from 2025)
- Production: 2021–present
- Assembly: China: Nanchang (JMEV); Russia: Kaliningrad (Avtotor; 2024–present)

Body and chassis
- Class: Small family car (C)
- Body style: 5-door sedan
- Layout: Front-motor, front-wheel-drive; Dual-motors all-wheel-drive

Powertrain
- Electric motor: Permanent magnet synchronous
- Power output: FWD: 60 kW (82 PS; 80 hp) (49 kWh only); 110 kW (150 PS; 148 hp); 119 kW (162 PS; 160 hp) (63 kWh only); AWD: 170 kW (231 PS; 228 hp) (63 kWh only)
- Transmission: Single-speed
- Battery: 49 or 63 kWh Li-NMC Battery; 54 kWh LFP CATL; 56.31 kWh LFP Farasis; 70.38 kWh LFP Farasis
- Electric range: 400–500 km (248.5–310.7 mi); 530–705 km (329–438 mi) (CLTC)

Dimensions
- Wheelbase: 2,750 mm (108.3 in)
- Length: 4,670 mm (183.9 in)
- Width: 1,830 mm (72.0 in)
- Height: 1,470 mm (57.9 in)
- Curb weight: 1,470–1,570 kg (3,241–3,461 lb)

The JMEV Yi (Chinese: 江铃羿; pinyin: Jiānglíng Yì) is a battery electric small family car produced by the French car manufacturer Renault through its subsidiary Mobilize, in a joint venture with Jiangling Motors Corporation Group through JMEV. It was presented at the International Motor Show Germany in September 2021 and is available from 2022 exclusively for car-sharing or taxi.

The car is manufactured by JMEV in Nanchang, China and is available with a 60 kWh battery and an estimated range of 450 km (280 mi).

== Background ==
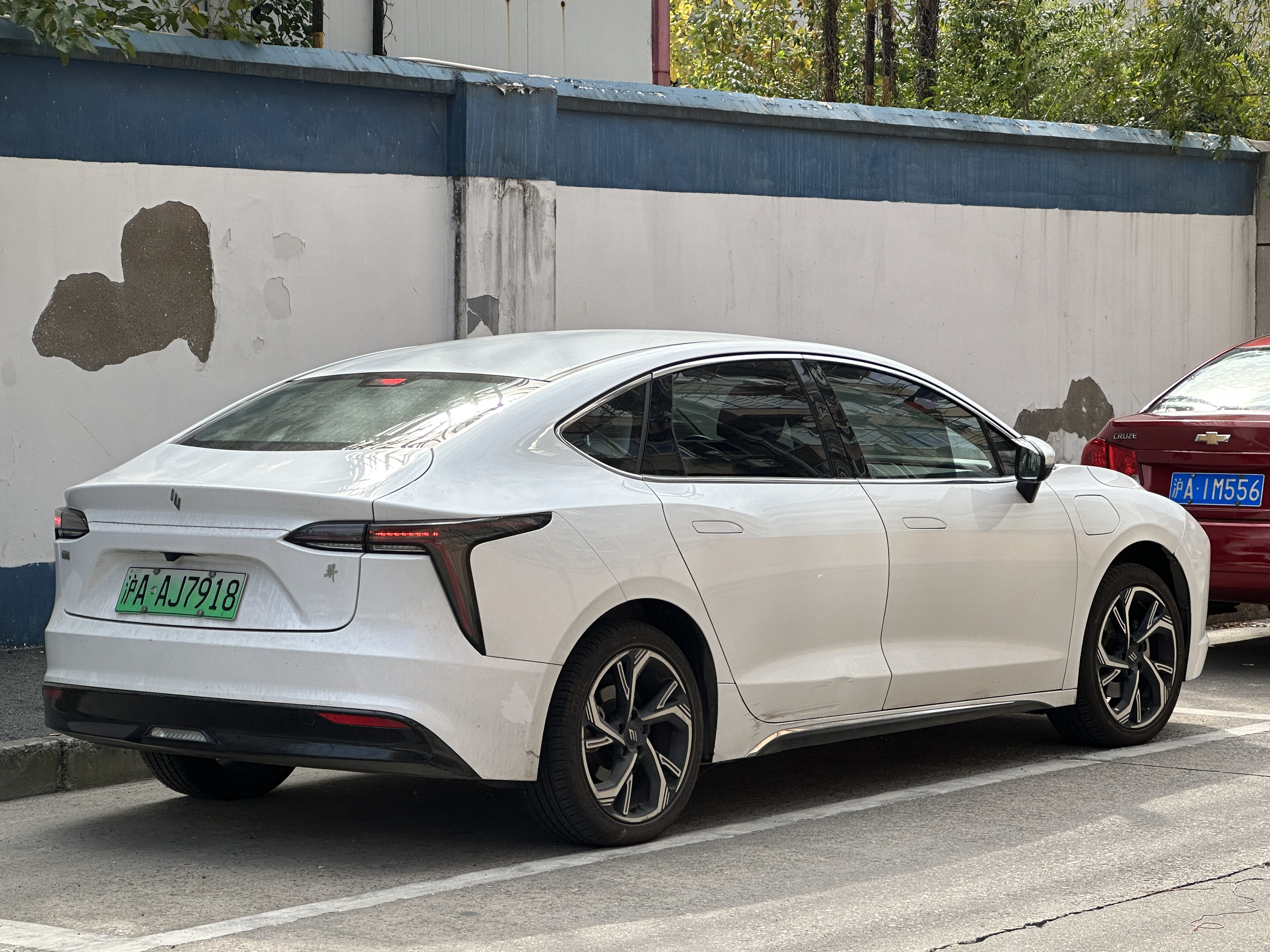
Rear view

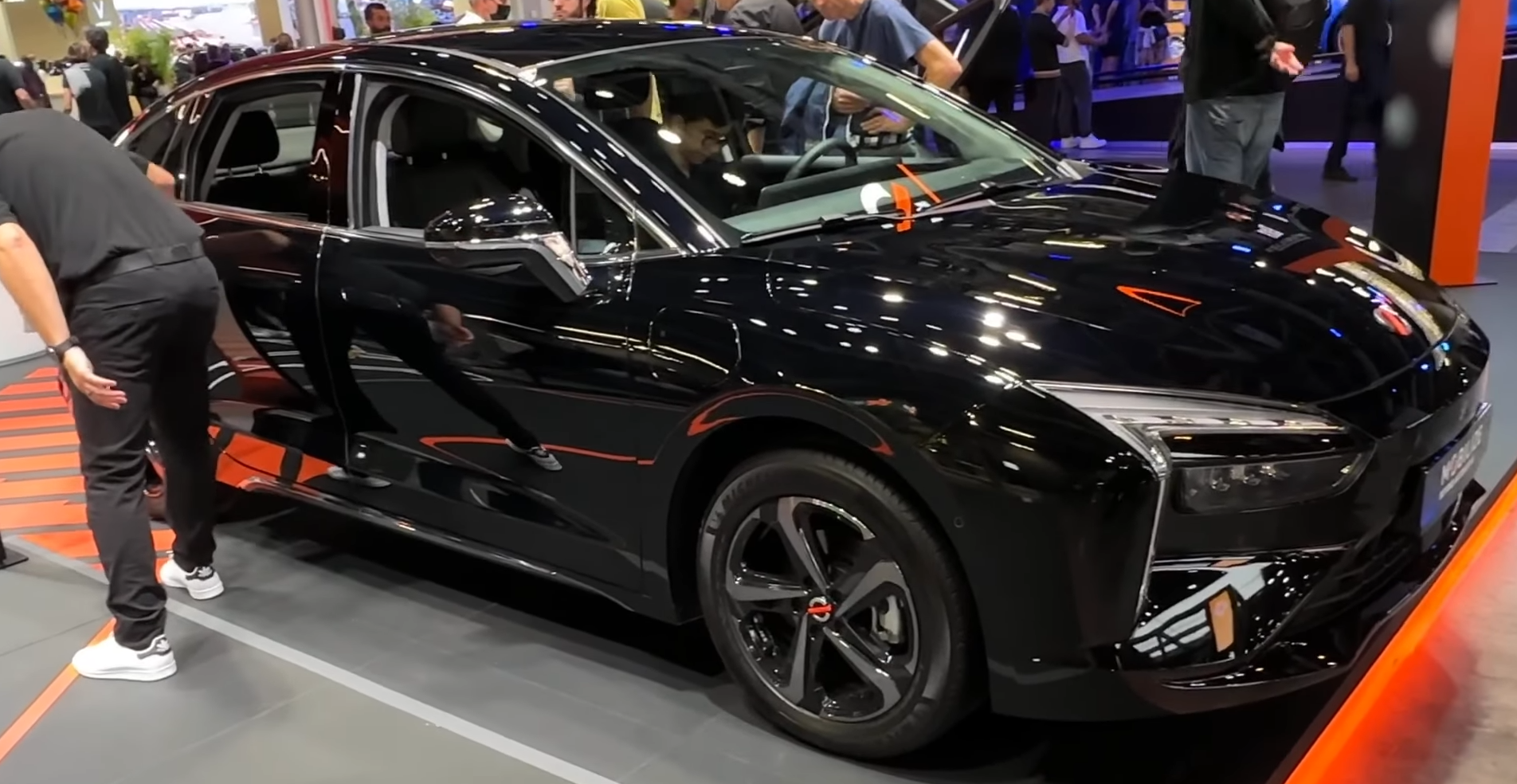
Mobilize Limo

Mobilize is a brand of the Renault group dedicated to passenger transport, such as vehicles reserved only for professional drivers (especially taxi drivers) or car-sharing.

The first Mobilize Limo fleet, consisting of 40 units, was put into service in mid-2022 by Cabify.

== Overview ==
The JMEV Yi is the version available for the Chinese market of the Mobilize Limo, also available with a 147-horsepower and an expected NEDC range of up to 400 km (250 mi).

In September 2021, Renault announced its intention to market the Yi in Europe as a subscription-only vehicle for professional drivers, under the name Mobilize Limo.

The Mobiize Limo was discontinued in 2023, as Mobilize judged the subscription-only model had no commercial potential for now.

On 10 September 2026, JMEV launched the CATL ChocoSEB battery swap version of the Yichi 05 in their home city of Nanchang. It is equipped with CATL's #25 ChocoSEB battery pack and is capable of battery swapping at CATL's ChocoSEB battery swap station network, of which there are 36 locations in Nanchang at the time of the launch. According to JMEV, ten enterprises attended the launch and signed contracts for 1,100 units.

The ChocoSEB version is equipped with a 54 kWh air-cooled swappable LFP battery pack which provides 530 kilometres (329 mi) of range and can recharge from 30–80% in 25 minutes. It is equipped with a permanent magnet synchronous front motor outputting 222 horsepower (166 kW; 225 PS) and 210 N⋅m (155 lb⋅ft) of torque, giving it a 0–100 km/h (62 mph) time of 8.9 seconds and a top speed of 160 km/h (99 mph).

== Safety ==
=== Euro NCAP ===
Euro NCAP test results Mobilize Limo Techo (LHD) (2022)
Test	Points	%
Overall:	4 /5 stars	
Adult occupant:	30.4	80%
Child occupant:	39	79%
Pedestrian:	37.7	69%
Safety assist:	11.4	71%

== Sales ==
Year	Sales
Year	China (Note: Figures for JMEV Yi)
2021	423
2022	3,184
2023	3,541
2024	3,296
2025	3,729

=== Mobilize Limo ===
33 vehicles have been sold in France. 43 units were registered in Spain, mainly through a partnership with Cabify.
