= BMW X5 (F15) =

Third generation of the BMW X5

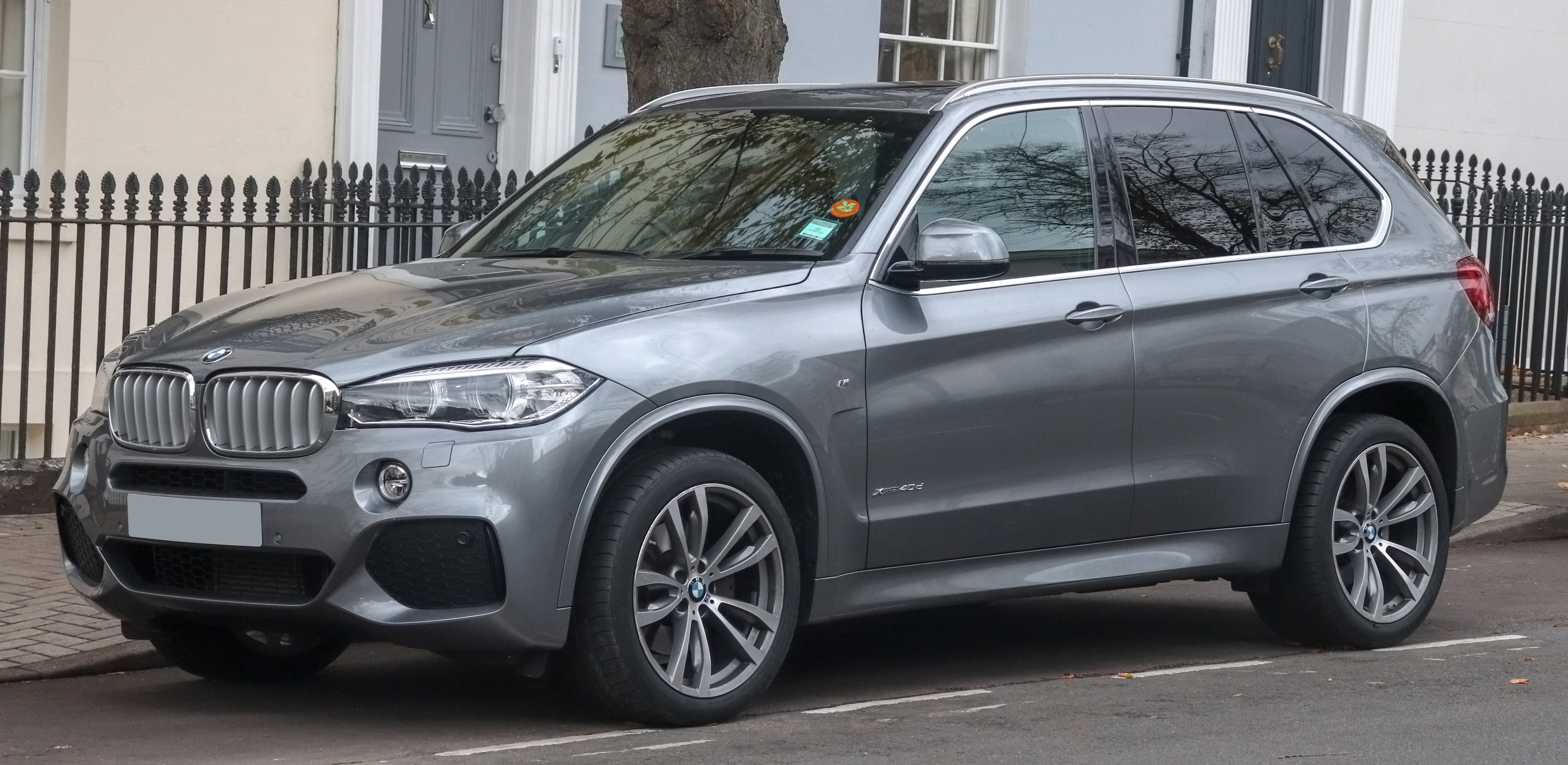

Overview
- Manufacturer: BMW
- Model code: F15
- Production: April 2013–July 2018
- Model years: 2014–2018
- Assembly: United States: Greer, South Carolina (BMW America); Russia: Kaliningrad (Avtotor); Egypt: Cairo; Indonesia: Jakarta (Gaya Motor); Malaysia: Kulim (Inokom)
- Designer: Mark Johnson (2010)

Body and chassis
- Class: Mid-size luxury crossover SUV
- Body style: 5-door SUV
- Layout: F4 layout (Except sDrive25d); FR layout (sDrive25d)
- Platform: BMW L4
- Related: BMW X6 (F16); BMW 5 Series (F10); BMW 5 Series (G30); VinFast LUX SA2.0; VinFast President

Powertrain
- Engine: petrol: 3.0 L N55 turbo I6; 4.4 L N63 twin turbo V8; petrol hybrid: 2.0 L N20 turbo I4; diesel: 2.0 L N47 turbo I4; 2.0 L B47 turbo I4; 3.0 L N57 turbo I6
- Transmission: 8-speed ZF 8HP automatic

Dimensions
- Wheelbase: 2,933 mm (115.5 in)
- Length: 4,886 mm (192.4 in)
- Width: 1,938 mm (76.3 in)
- Height: 1,762 mm (69.4 in)
- Curb weight: 2,105–2,350 kg (4,641–5,181 lb)

Chronology
- Predecessor: BMW X5 (E70)
- Successor: BMW X5 (G05)

The BMW X5 (F15) is the third generation of the X5 series of mid-size luxury crossover SUVs manufactured and marketed worldwide by BMW from 2013 to 2018. The car was unveiled at the 2013 Frankfurt International Motor Show. Early X5 models include xDrive50i, xDrive30d, M50d. BMW xDrive40d, xDrive35i, xDrive25d, sDrive25d were to be added in December 2013.

The X5 arrived in US showrooms in 2013. Early models include sDrive35i, xDrive35i, xDrive50i, followed by xDrive35d in early 2014, and the xDrive40e, a plug-in hybrid variant in 2015.

== Concept cars ==
=== BMW Concept X5 eDrive (2013) ===
The BMW Concept X5 eDrive is a plug-in hybrid concept vehicle version of the X5 with kidney grille slats, air intake bars and the inlay in the rear bumper in the BMW i Blue colour; Silverflake metallic body colour, xDrive all-wheel-drive system, specially designed roof rails, a connector for the charging cable that lights up during charging, 21-inch light-alloy wheels in an exclusive aerodynamically optimised design, a four-cylinder BMW TwinPower Turbo combustion engine and a 70 kW (94 hp) electric motor developed by the BMW Group, a charging cable stored in the load area below the flat storage compartment and BMW ConnectedDrive with Remote app. The electric motor can be driven at top speed of 120 km/h (75 mph). The battery mode has an all-electric range of 30 km (19 mi).

The vehicle was unveiled at the 2013 Frankfurt International Motor Show. The production model was named BMW X5 xDrive40e.

=== BMW Concept X5 Security Plus (2013) ===
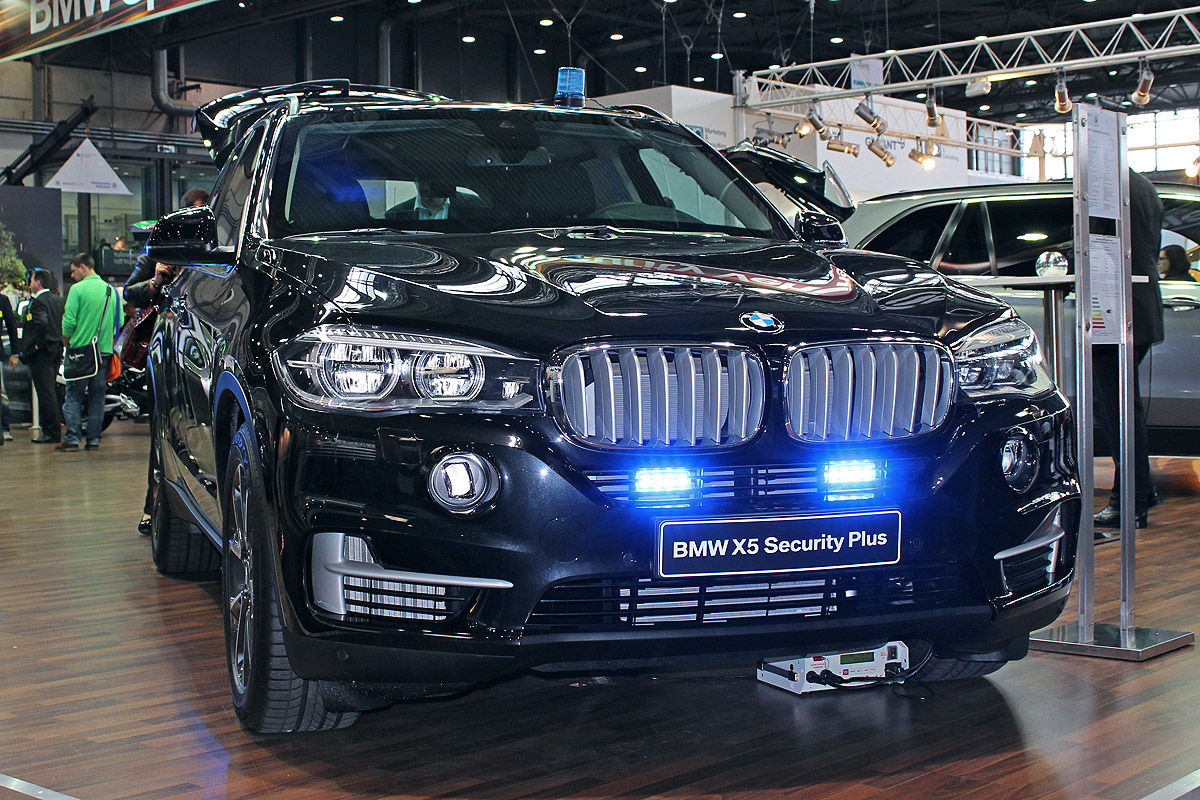
BMW Concept X5 Security Plus

The BMW Concept X5 Security Plus is an armoured version of BMW X5 xDrive50i with protection level VR6, with armoured passenger cell constructed from high-performance steel mouldings and panels, sealed joints, security glass, Intelligent Emergency Call system and optional BMW ConnectedDrive. Other options included LED strobe lights in the radiator grille, roof beacons with a siren system and an auxiliary battery.

The vehicle was unveiled at the 2013 Frankfurt International Motor Show.

== Production models ==
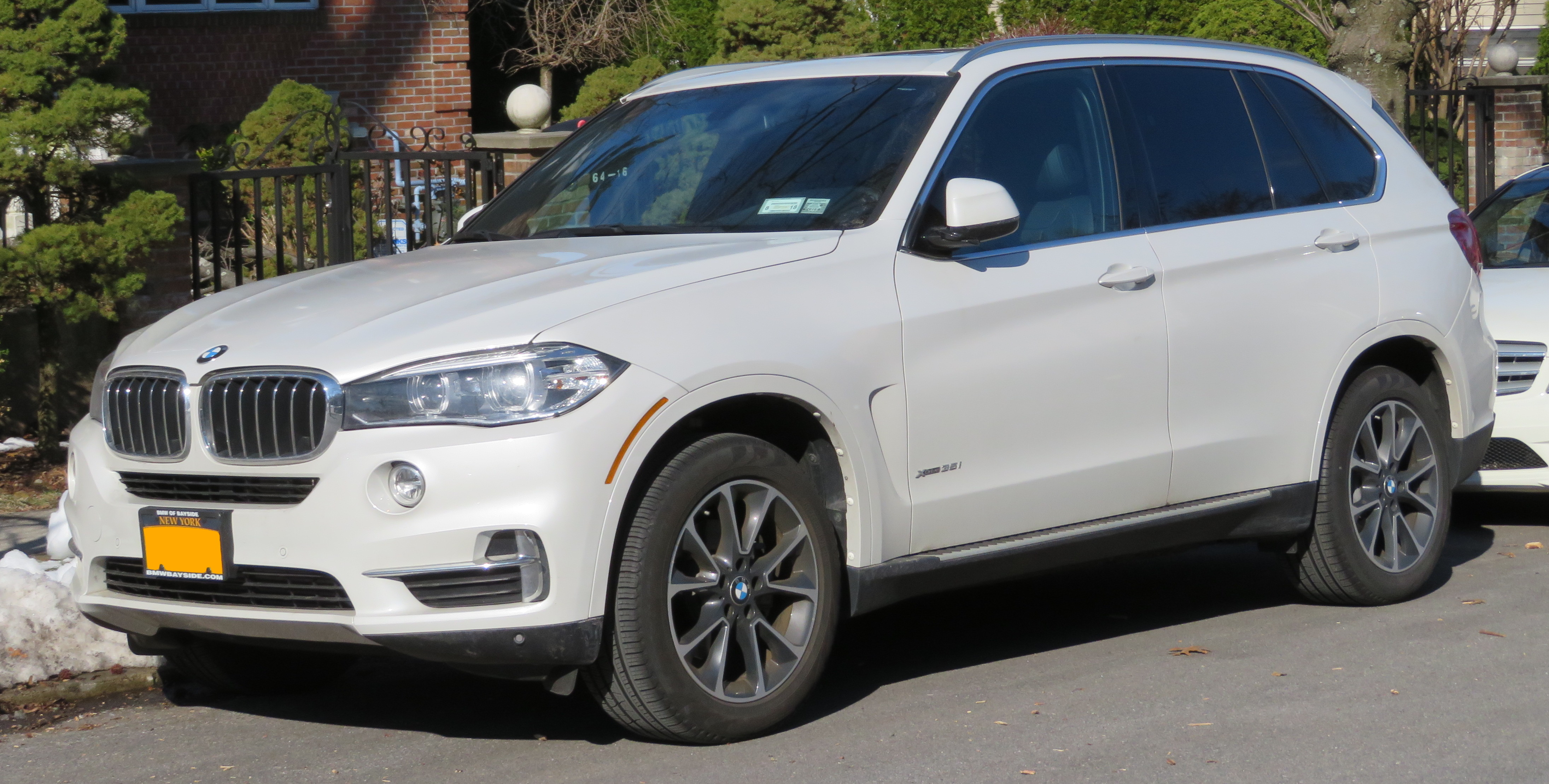
BMW X5 xDrive35i

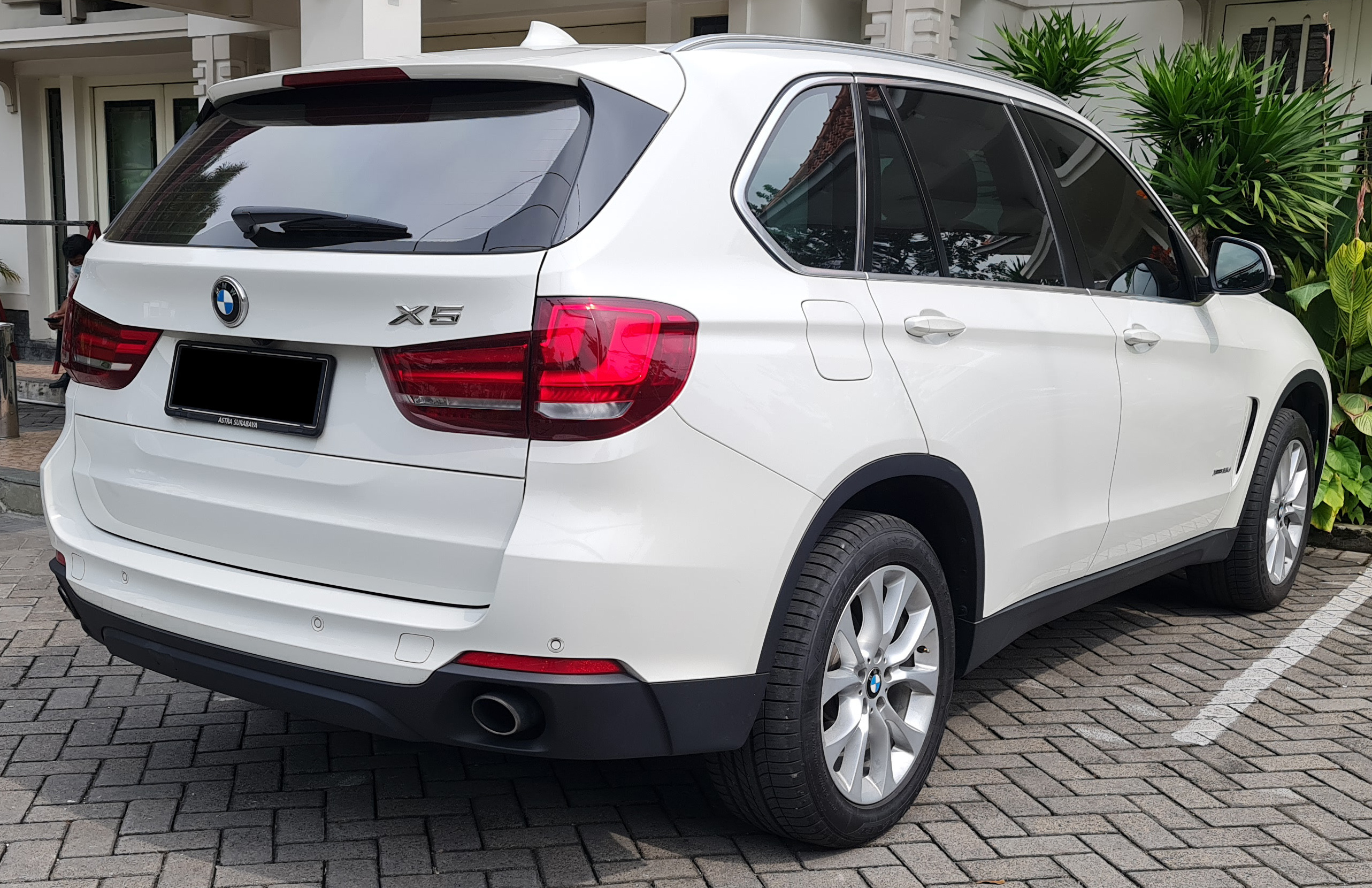
BMW X5 xDrive25d

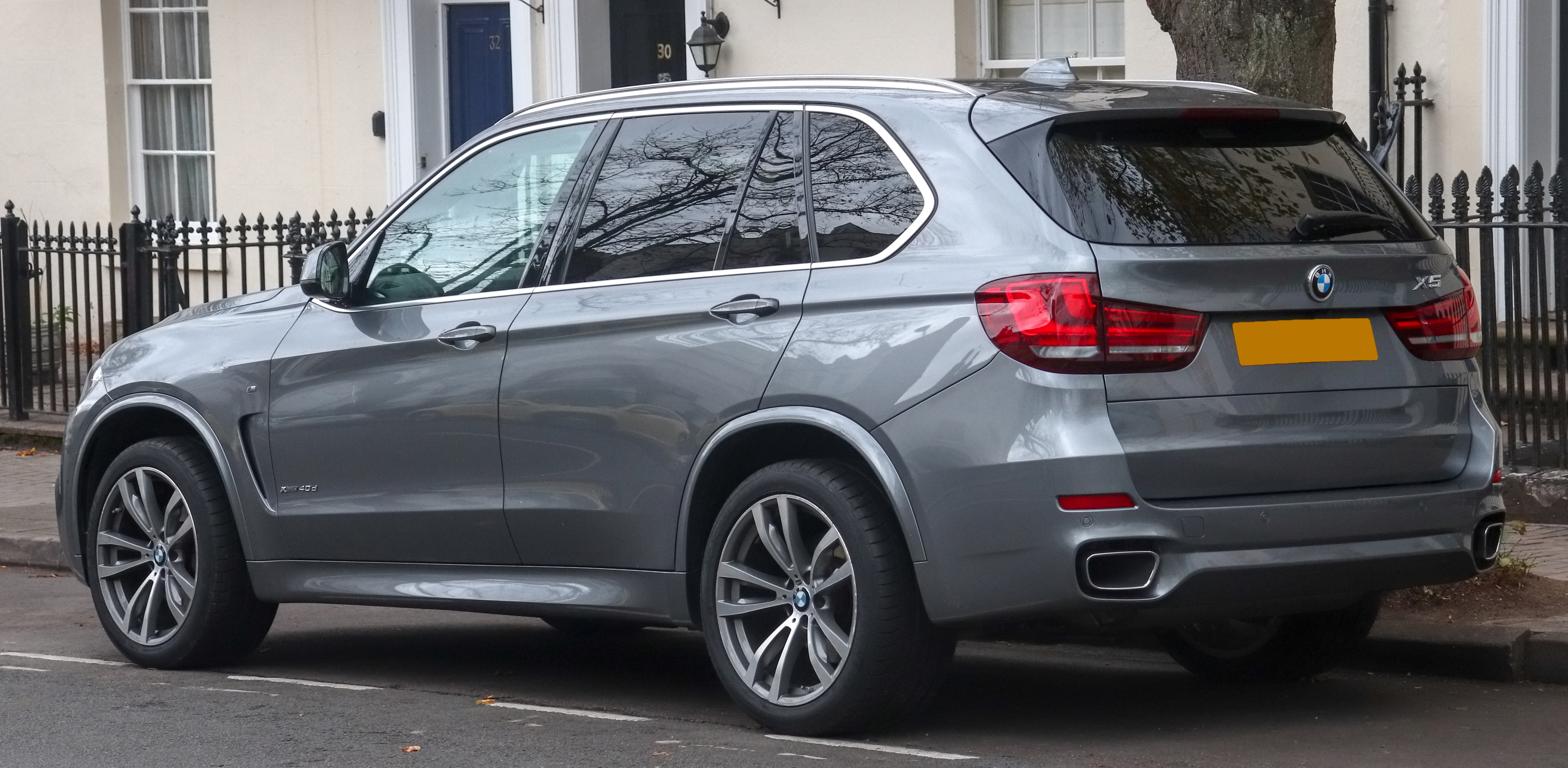
BMW X5 xDrive40d M Sport

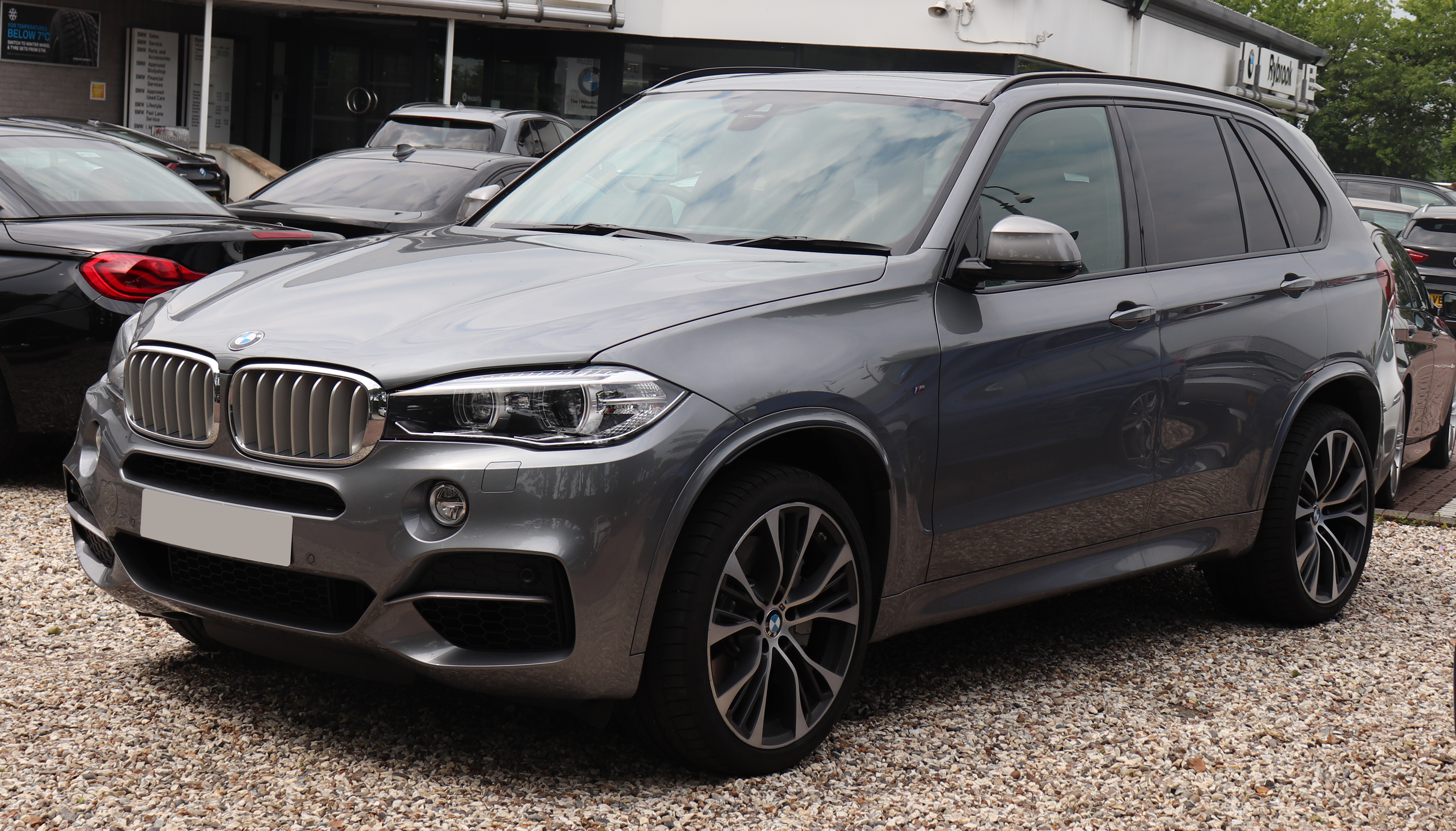

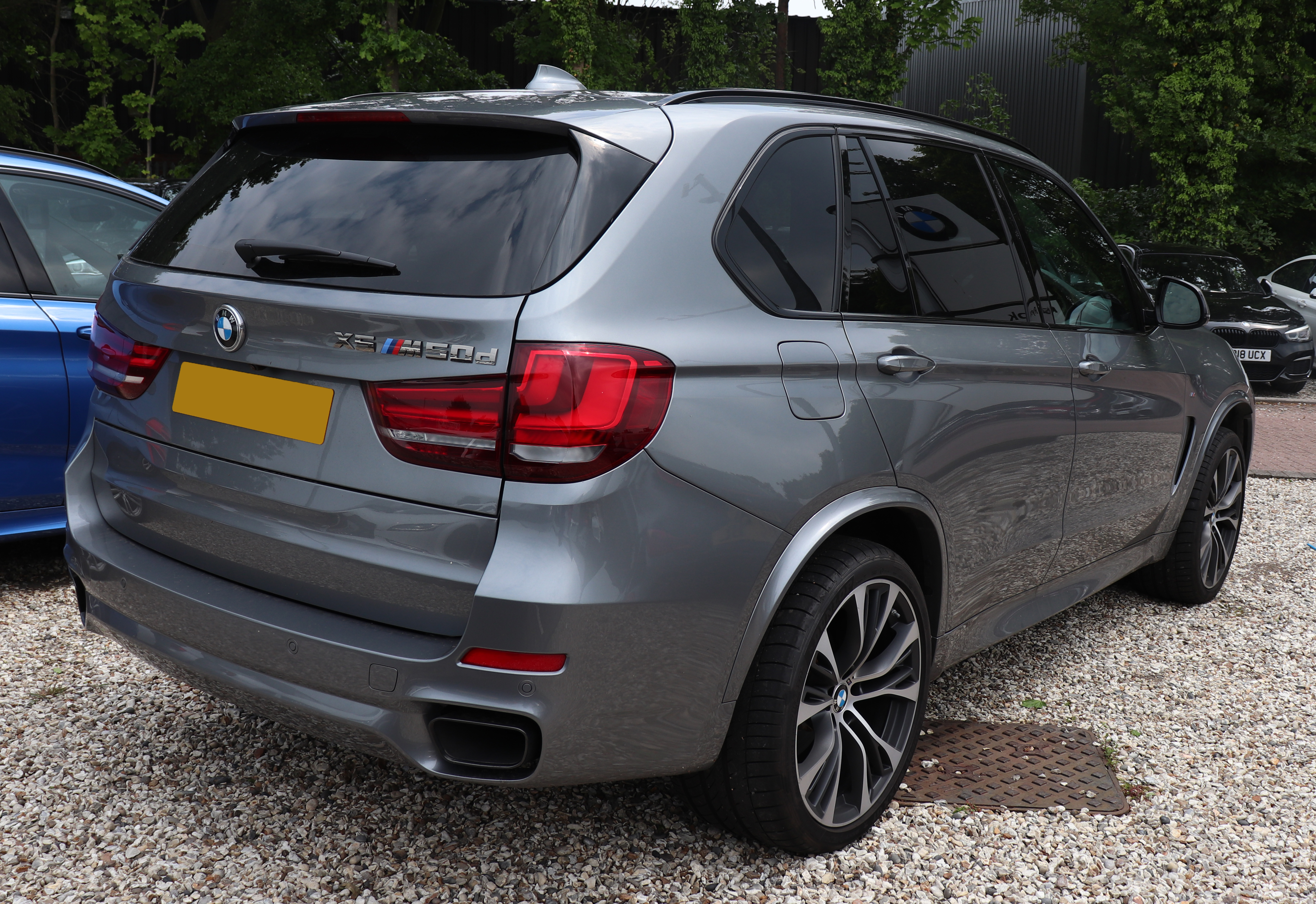
BMW X5 M 50d

=== BMW X5 M50d, BMW Individual range, Original BMW Accessories (2013–2018) ===
The BMW X5 M50d is an "M Performance" model. That designation places it between the other regular series production variants and the X5 M. It includes a triple-turbo 3 litre, 6 cylinder diesel engine unique to certain BMW models with "50d" in the model name, Adaptive M suspension (Dynamic Damper Control and air suspension at the rear axle, Electric Power Steering) and 19-inch M light-alloy wheels in double-spoke design, mixed tyres. The optional Dynamic adaptive suspension package includes Dynamic Performance Control and Dynamic Drive active roll stabilisation, which virtually eliminates body roll when cornering, despite the height and weight of the vehicle.

The BMW Individual range includes additional customisation options, such as up to seven layers of paint (including Ruby Black metallic and Pyrite Brown metallic) and the addition of special colour pigments creating iridescent effects, 20-inch BMW Individual light-alloy wheels in V-spoke design with mixed tyres, fine-grain full Merino leather trim in Amaro Brown and Criollo Brown from BMW Individual and BMW Individual interior trim strips in Piano Finish Black or Sen Light Brown.

Original BMW Accessories range for the BMW X5 include floor mats (with rubber surface integrated in the foot area), luggage compartment mats, transport bags (includes a Storage Bag Fond), seat organiser, ski and snowboard bag (max 4 pairs of skis or 3 snowboards, integrated rollers, handles and a shoulder strap) and transport bag for ski boots, helmets and gloves.

The BMW Individual range was scheduled to be available from December 2013.

=== X5 M ===
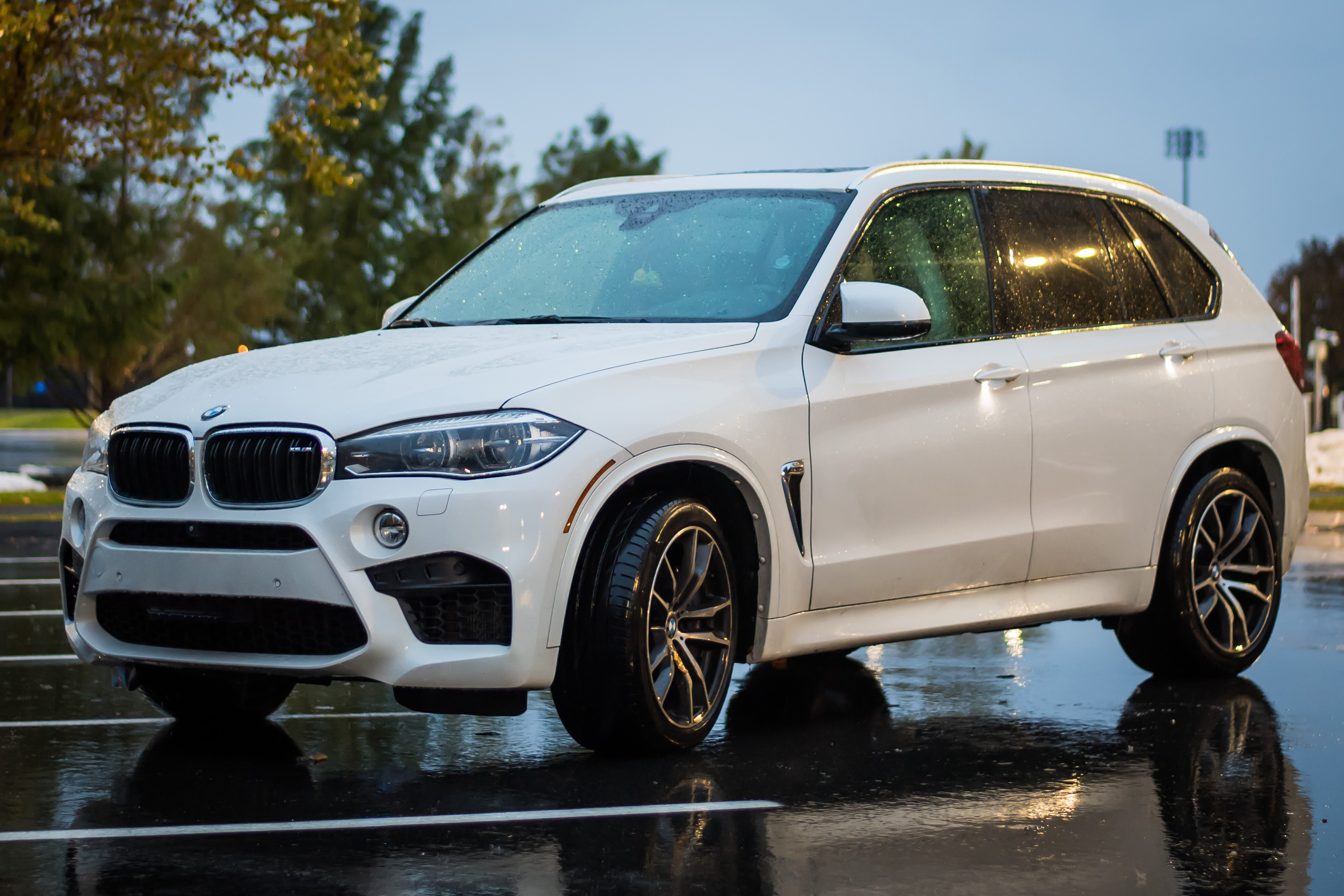
BMW X5M

The BMW M performance derivative of the F15 X5 is designated F85 and was released in 2015. Its S63B44T2 4.4-liter V8 engine has 423 kW (567 hp) and 553 lb⋅ft (750 N⋅m) of torque, making it the most powerful engine ever developed for an all-wheel drive BMW at the time. The engine has M TwinPower Turbo and Valvetronic technologies, to deliver a 0–100 km/h (62 mph) time of 4.2 seconds.

An M-tuned xDrive all-wheel drive system provides traction. It distributes drive between the front and rear axles, while Dynamic Performance Control distributes torque between the 21-inch M Double-spoke light-alloy wheels.

=== X5 xDrive40e ===
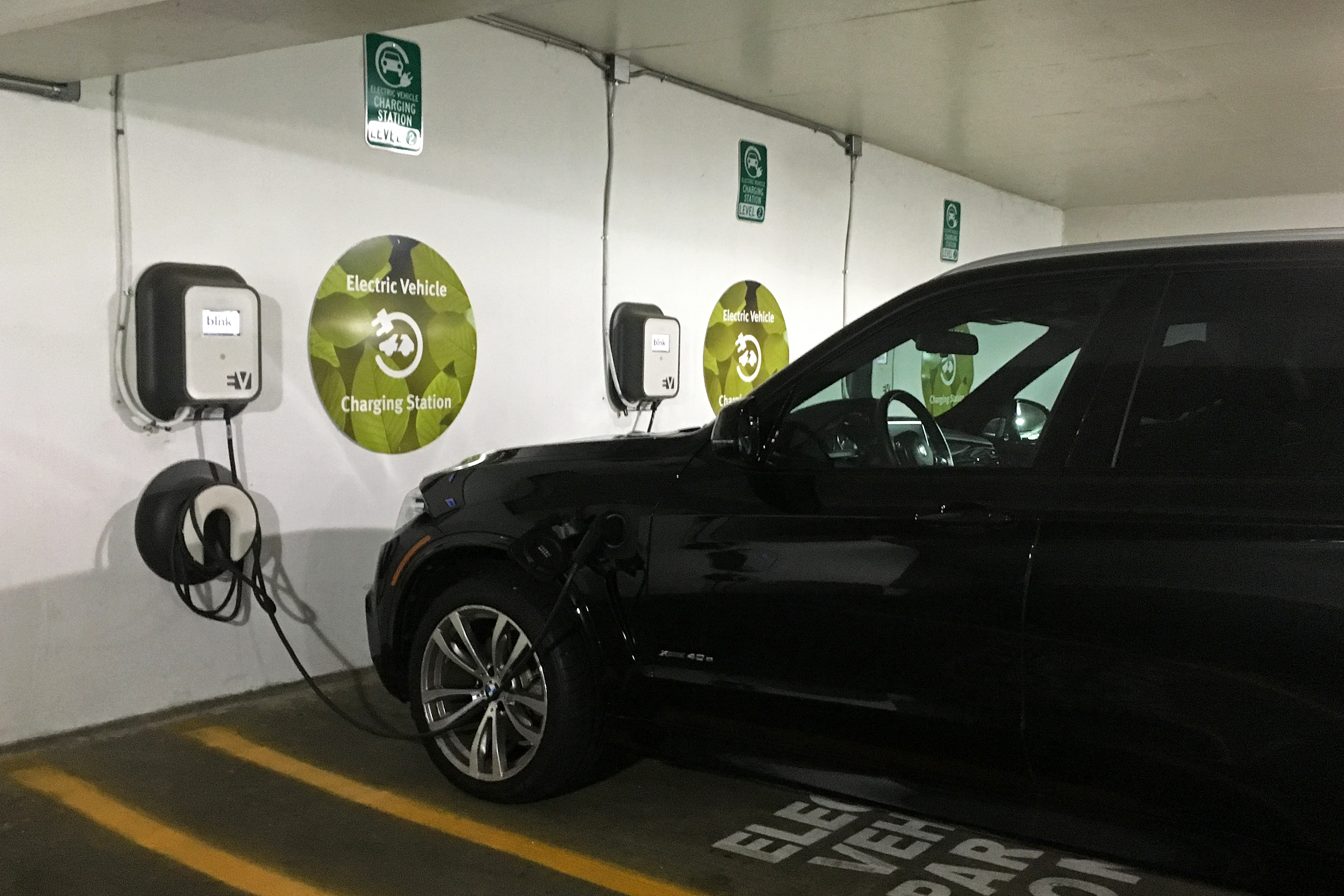
The BMW X5 xDrive40e is a plug-in hybrid with an all-electric range of 23 km (14 mi).

The BMW X5 xDrive40e is the first plug-in hybrid released under the core BMW brand. The use of BMW's eDrive technology on the established X5 platform is a direct technology transfer from the BMW i cars, in particular, from the BMW i8 technology.

The X5 xDrive40e features a 2.0 L turbocharged gasoline engine 180 kW (241 hp) coupled to a 83 kW (111 hp) electric motor and a 9.0 kWh battery.

The production of the plug-in hybrid variant was scheduled to begin in April 2015. Retail deliveries (US) began in October 2015. Pricing started at US$62,100 (equivalent to £40,365) before applicable US government incentives.

The US EPA rated the X5 xDrive40e combined city/highway fuel economy at 68 mpg_{‑US} (3.5 L/100 km; 82 mpg_{‑imp}) equivalent (MPG-e) in all-electric mode (energy consumption of 59 kW-hrs/100 mi). The fuel economy in gasoline-only mode was rated at 24 mpg_{‑US} (9.8 L/100 km; 29 mpg_{‑imp}). EPA's all-electric range is 14 mi (23 km) with the car using some gasoline, and as a result, EPA's official range varies between 0 and 14 mi (0 and 23 km).

=== BMW X5 sDrive35i ===
BMW introduced the sDrive rear-wheel drive system with this generation of X5. sDrive aimed to increase agility over traditional rear-wheel drive SUVs.

=== BMW X5 emergency vehicles (2014–2018) ===
The BMW X5 has been made into emergency response vehicles with the engines sDrive25d, xDrive30d and xDrive40d.

The vehicle was unveiled at the 14th RETTmobil trade fair in Fuda (xDrive30d).

== Specifications ==
=== Design ===
The new generation BMW X5 is 5 mm (0.2 in) wider, 26 mm (1.0 in) longer and 14 mm (0.6 in) lower than E70, but wheelbase remains at 2,933 mm (115.5 in). At the front, it follows a similar design to the 5 Series (F10) while at the rear it is similar to other current X Series models. The interior now features 10.25 inch display. The exterior, designed by BMW designer Mark Johnson, was approved in November 2010 and production finalised in 2011.

=== Technology ===
BMW claims the new X5 is made of ultra-high-tensile steel in the body structure, thermoplastics in the side panels, aluminium in the bonnet and magnesium in the instrument panel support to make the new BMW X5 lighter. Depending on the model, the new X5 is as much as 90 kg (198 lb) lighter than a comparably equipped corresponding model from the previous X5 generation.

=== Equipment ===
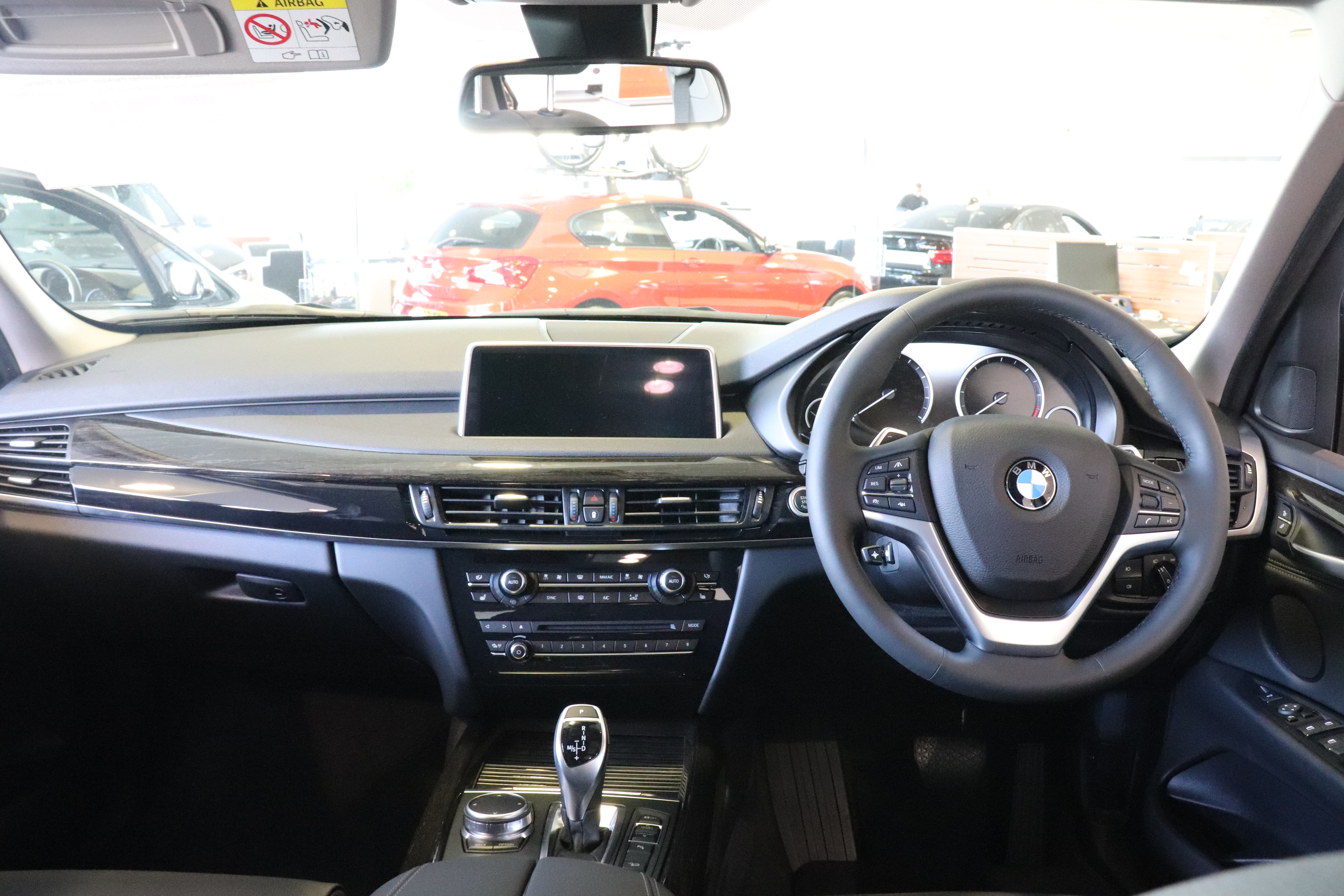
Interior

In 2013, model-specific BMW Individual options were added to the optional extras already available for all engine variants of the new BMW X5. Options included BMW Individual fine-grain Merino leather trim in Criollo Brown and Amaro Brown (stitching and piping in a contrasting colour and decorative perforations on the seat surfaces), BMW Individual interior trim strips in Piano Finish Black and Sen Light Brown fine wood, 20-inch BMW Individual light-alloy wheels in V-spoke design with mixed tyres and additional body colours (Mineral Silver, Glacier Silver and Imperial Blue diamond effect metallic paint variants; BMW Individual finishes Ruby Black metallic and Pyrite Brown metallic).

New for the F15 X5 was a high-end Bang and Olufsen premium surround-sound system, which included sixteen speakers, a 5.1-channel external amplifier, and metal speaker grilles. In addition, a Harman Kardon premium audio system, also featuring sixteen speakers and a 600-watt amplifier, was also available as an upgrade to the standard nine-speaker "Hi-Fi" audio system.

Traffic Jam Assistant option for Driving Assistant Plus, improved BMW Parking Assistant (accelerator, brake pedal, gear shift controls) became available for BMW X5 from December 2013.

For the 2017-2018 model years, all F15 X5 models were equipped with the new BMW iDrive Professional NBT EVO - iDrive 5.0/6.0 infotainment system, which included a touchscreen display for the first time in addition to the iDrive controller in the center console. Wireless Apple CarPlay smartphone integration also became available as a standalone option for vehicles equipped with the GPS navigation system.

M Performance Parts can be fitted to 25-50 models with the M Sport trim. These include a sport steering wheel, carbon fibre trim, aluminium pedals, black kidney grilles, M Rims, mirrors, rear flaps, diffuser, splitter, in carbon fibre, black side skirts and sport brakes. 30d and 35i models can get a power boost kit increasing power and torque to 277 hp (207 kW) and 584 N⋅m (431 lbf⋅ft) on the 30d and to 326 hp (243 kW) and 450 N⋅m (332 lbf⋅ft) on the 35i.

Full M models have their own M Performance Parts. These include black kidney grilles, a carbon fibre gear selector, a sport steering wheel, carbon fibre mirrors, black side vents, carbon fibre trim and fuel filler cap.

=== Engines ===
==== Petrol ====
| Model | Years | Drivetrain | Engine- turbo | Power | Torque |
|---|---|---|---|---|---|
| sDrive35i | 2013–2018 | RWD | 3.0 L Turbo N55 straight-6 | 225 kW (302 hp) at 5,800-6,000 rpm | 400 N⋅m (295 lb⋅ft) at 1,200-5,000 rpm |
| xDrive35i | 2013–2018 | AWD | 3.0 L Turbo N55 straight-6 | 225 kW (302 hp) at 5,800-6,000 rpm | 400 N⋅m (295 lb⋅ft) at 1,200-5,000 rpm |
| xDrive40e | 2015–2018 | AWD | 2.0 L Turbo N20 straight-4 + electric motor | 230 kW (308 hp) at 3,200-6,100 rpm | 450 N⋅m (332 lb⋅ft) at 1,800-3,800 rpm |
| xDrive50i | 2013–2018 | AWD | 4.4 L Twin Turbo N63; V8 | 331 kW (444 hp) at 5,500-6,000 rpm | 650 N⋅m (479 lb⋅ft) at 2,000-4,500 rpm |

==== Diesel ====
| Model | Years | Drivetrain | Engine- turbo | Power | Torque |
|---|---|---|---|---|---|
| sDrive25d | 2013–07/2015 | RWD | 2.0 L N47 straight-4 | 160 kW (215 hp) at 4,400 rpm | 450 N⋅m (332 lb⋅ft) at 1,500-2,500 rpm |
| sDrive25d | 08/2015-2018 | RWD | 2.0 L B47 straight-4 | 170 kW (228 hp) at 4,400 rpm | 500 N⋅m (369 lb⋅ft) at 1,500–3,000 rpm |
| xDrive25d | 2013–07/2015 | AWD | 2.0 L N47 straight-4 | 160 kW (215 hp) at 4,400 rpm | 450 N⋅m (332 lb⋅ft) at 1,500-2,500 rpm |
| xDrive25d | 08/2015-2018 | AWD | 2.0 L B47 straight-4 | 170 kW (228 hp) at 4,400 rpm | 500 N⋅m (369 lb⋅ft) at 1,500–3,000 rpm |
| xDrive30d | 2013–2018 | AWD | 3.0 L N57 straight-6 | 190 kW (255 hp) at 4,000 rpm | 560 N⋅m (413 lb⋅ft) at 1,500-3,000 rpm |
| xDrive35d* | 2013–2018 | AWD | 3.0 L N57 straight-6 | 190 kW (255 hp) at 4,000 rpm | 560 N⋅m (413 lb⋅ft) at 1,500-3,000 rpm |
| xDrive40d | 2013–2018 | AWD | 3.0 L N57 straight-6 | 230 kW (309 hp) at 4,400 rpm | 630 N⋅m (465 lb⋅ft) at 1,500-2,500 rpm |
| M50d | 2013–2018 | AWD | 3.0 L N57S | 280 kW (376 hp) at 4,000-4,400 rpm straight-6 | 740 N⋅m (546 lb⋅ft) at 2,000-3,000 rpm |

* North American xDrive35d models used the six-cylinder engine from the European-specification xDrive30d models. Vehicles with Diesel engine sold in the United States were since end of 2008 equipped with selective catalysator using Diesel exhaust fluid (DEF) to reduce NOx emissions, while the BMW X5 sold in Europe did not use a selective catalytic reduction system (with AdBlue injection) until 2013 when the F15 X5 was released. These vehicles met the Euro 6 emissions standard.

=== Gearbox ===
All models include an 8-speed Steptronic automatic gearbox. With the option of a ‘Sport Steptronic’ automatic gearbox which had faster up & downshift times. It also included paddle shifters located behind the steering wheel for a sportier drive. The standard Steptronic transmission did not have paddle shifters and the only way to manually control the forward gears was to use the shifter in the centre console.

=== Performance ===
Petrol engines
| Model | Years | Acceleration 0–100 km/h (0–62 mph) (s) | Top speed | Average fuel cons. | Weight (EU) |
|---|---|---|---|---|---|
| xDrive35i | 2013–2018 | 6.1 | 235 km/h (146 mph) | 8.4 L (28 mpg) | 2070kg (4564 lb) |
| xDrive40e | 2014–2018 | 6.5 | 235 km/h (146 mph) | 8.5 L (27.6 mpg) | 2230kg (4916 lb) |
| xDrive50i | 2013–2018 | 5.0 | 250 km/h (155 mph) | 10.4-10.5 (22.6 mpg) | 2,250 kg (4,960 lb) |

Diesel engines
| Model | Years | Acceleration 0–100 km/h (0–62 mph) (s) | Top speed | Average fuel cons. | Weight (EU) |
|---|---|---|---|---|---|
| sDrive25d | 2013–07/2015 | 8.2 | 220 km/h (137 mph) | 5.6 (42 mpg) | / |
| sDrive25d | 08/2015–2018 | 7.7 | 220 km/h (137 mph) | 5.3 L/100 km (44 mpg) | 1,995 kg (4,398 lb) |
| xDrive25d | 2013–2018 | 8.2 | 220 km/h (137 mph) | 5.9 (39.8 mpg) | / |
| xDrive30d | 2013–2018 | 6.9 | 230 km/h (143 mph) | 6.2 (37.9 mpg) | 2,145 kg (4,729 lb) |
| xDrive40d | 2013–2018 | 5.9 | 236 km/h (147 mph) | 6.4 (36.7 mpg) | / |
| M50d | 2013–2018 | 5.3 | 250 km/h (155 mph) | 6.7 (35.1 mpg) | 2,265 kg (4,993 lb) |

=== Production ===
BMW X5 and the corresponding Security models were built in BMW Spartanburg plant in the USA. X5 Security's special security features themselves are installed in the Toluca plant in Mexico.
