= Changan X5 =

Chinese compact crossover SUV

Changan X5 Plus
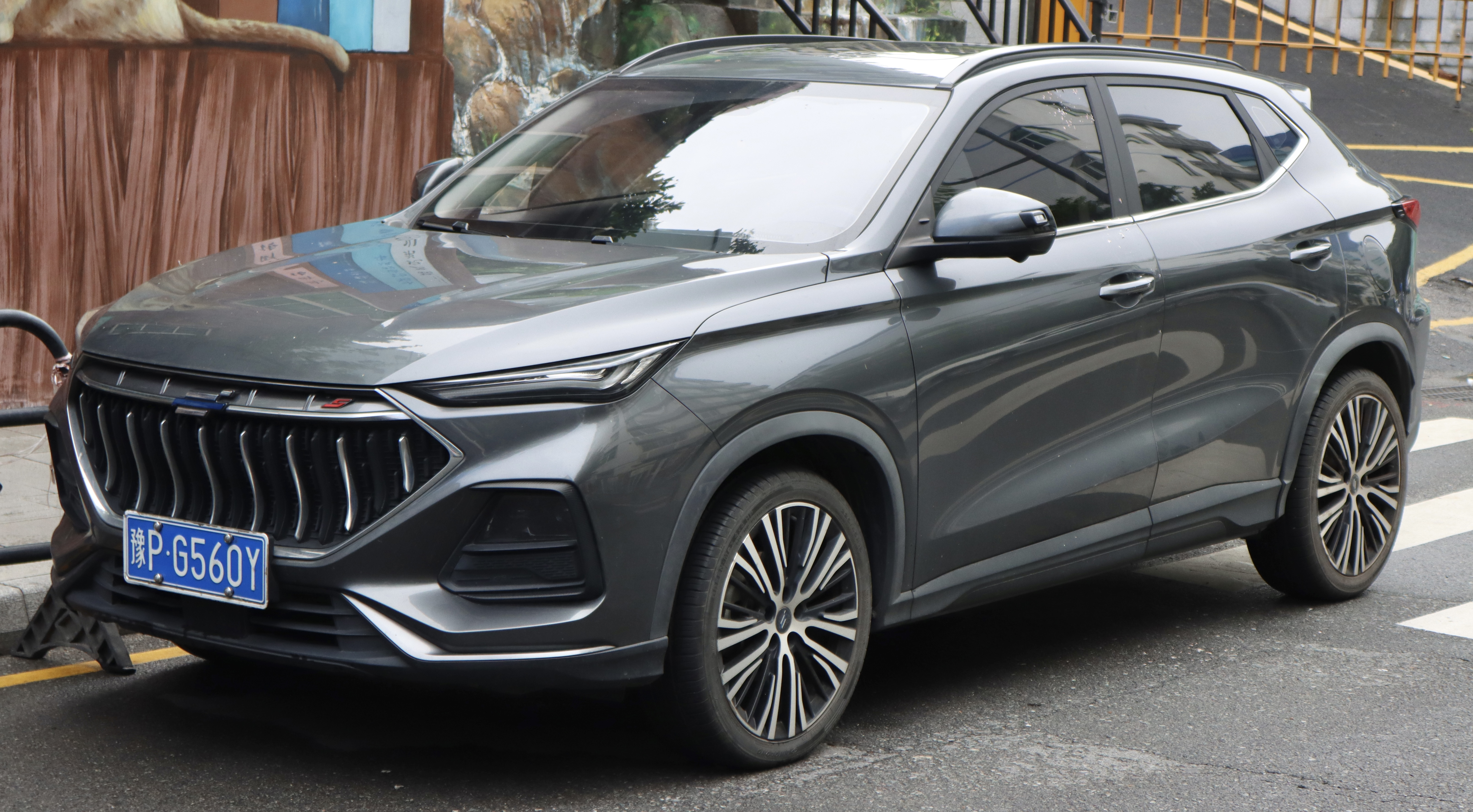

Overview
- Manufacturer: Changan Automobile
- Also called: Oshan X5 (2020–2022); Oshan X5 Plus (2022–2024); Volga K30 (Russia); Changan CS35 Max
- Production: 2020–present
- Assembly: China: Chongqing; Russia: Nizhny Novgorod

Body and chassis
- Class: Compact crossover SUV
- Body style: 5-door SUV
- Layout: Front-engine, front-wheel-drive
- Platform: Changan MPA

Powertrain
- Engine: Petrol: 1.5 L Blue Whale NE I4 turbo; 1.5 L Blue Core I4 turbo
- Transmission: 7-speed DCT; 5-speed manual

Dimensions
- Wheelbase: 2,710 mm (106.7 in)
- Length: 4,490 mm (176.8 in)
- Width: 1,860 mm (73.2 in)
- Height: 1,580 mm (62.2 in)

The Changan X5 Plus, or previously known as Oshan X5, is a 5-seater compact crossover SUV produced by Changan Automobile under the Oshan brand. The vehicle was marketed as the Changan X5 after the Oshan brand was discontinued in 2024.

== Overview ==
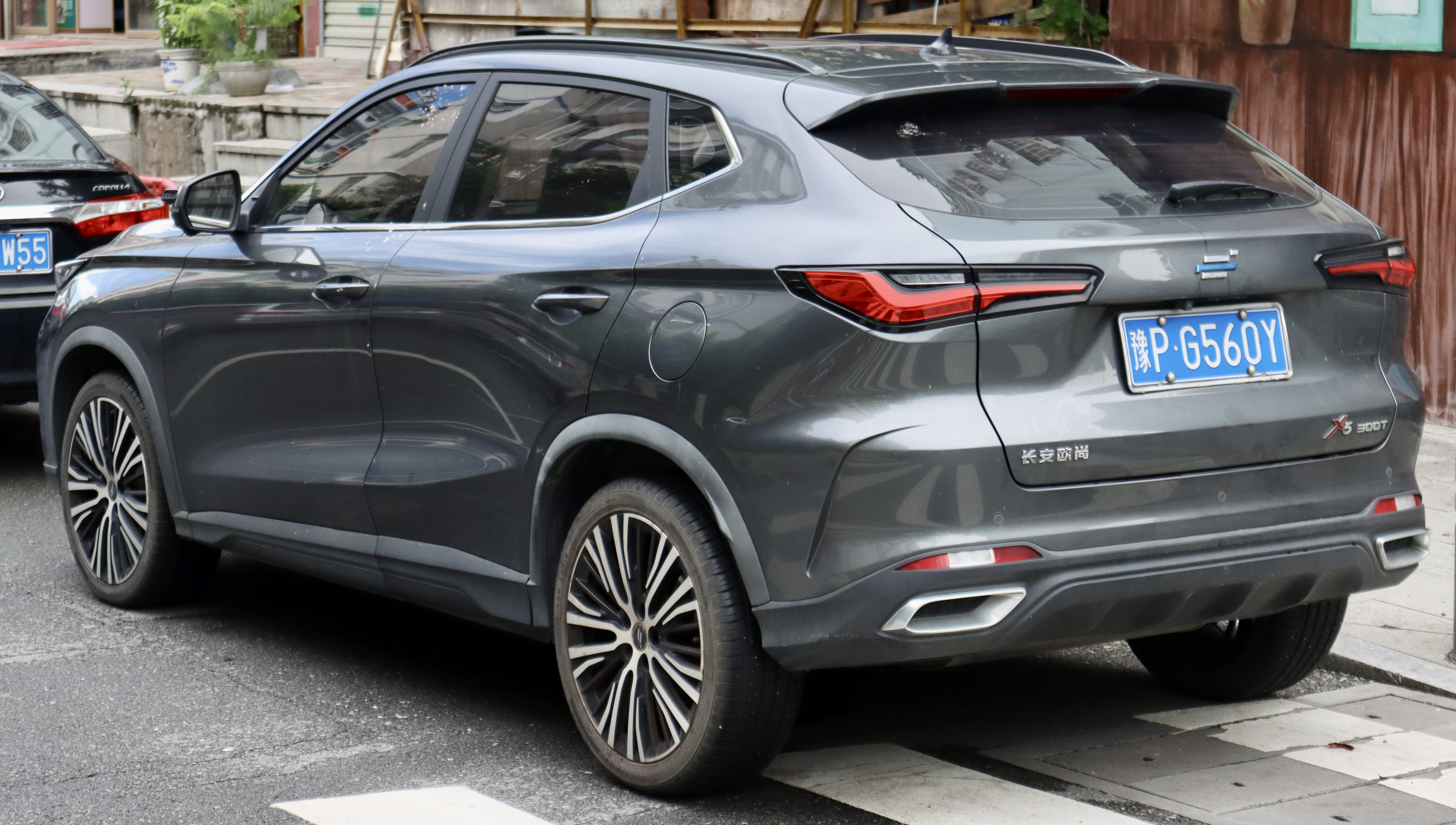
Rear view

The X5 debuted at the July 2020 Chengdu Motor Show and was launched on the Chinese auto market in November 2020 with prices ranging from 69,900 yuan to 102,900 yuan.

The X5 was originally branded under Oshan (also spelled Oushan or Oushang), Changan's affordable premium sub-brand that focused on producing compact MPVs and crossovers.

The Oshan X5 is based on the Changan MPA platform, and is powered by the 1.5-liter Blue Whale NE turbo engine producing 180 hp (134 kW; 182 PS) and 221 lb⋅ft (300 N⋅m) of torque mated to a seven-speed dual-clutch transmission.

== Oshan X5 Plus and Changan CS35 Max ==
The Oshan X5 Plus is a facelift variant of the Oshan X5 launched in November 2022. Since 2024 the car was rebranded as the Changan X5 Plus due to the Oshan brand's discontinuation. It adds more sporty red stripes to the front bumpers, side skirts and interior, changing from orange to red, positioning the vehicle as a sporty SUV. The facelift was seemingly unchanged from the previous nameplate. The powertrain features the Blue Core 1.5 liter turbo engine with a maximum power output of 188 hp (140 kW; 191 PS) and a peak torque of 221 lb⋅ft (300 N⋅m). The X5 Plus's gearbox is a 7-speed automatic transmission. Changan claims the 0–100 km/h (62 mph) acceleration time is 7.51 seconds.

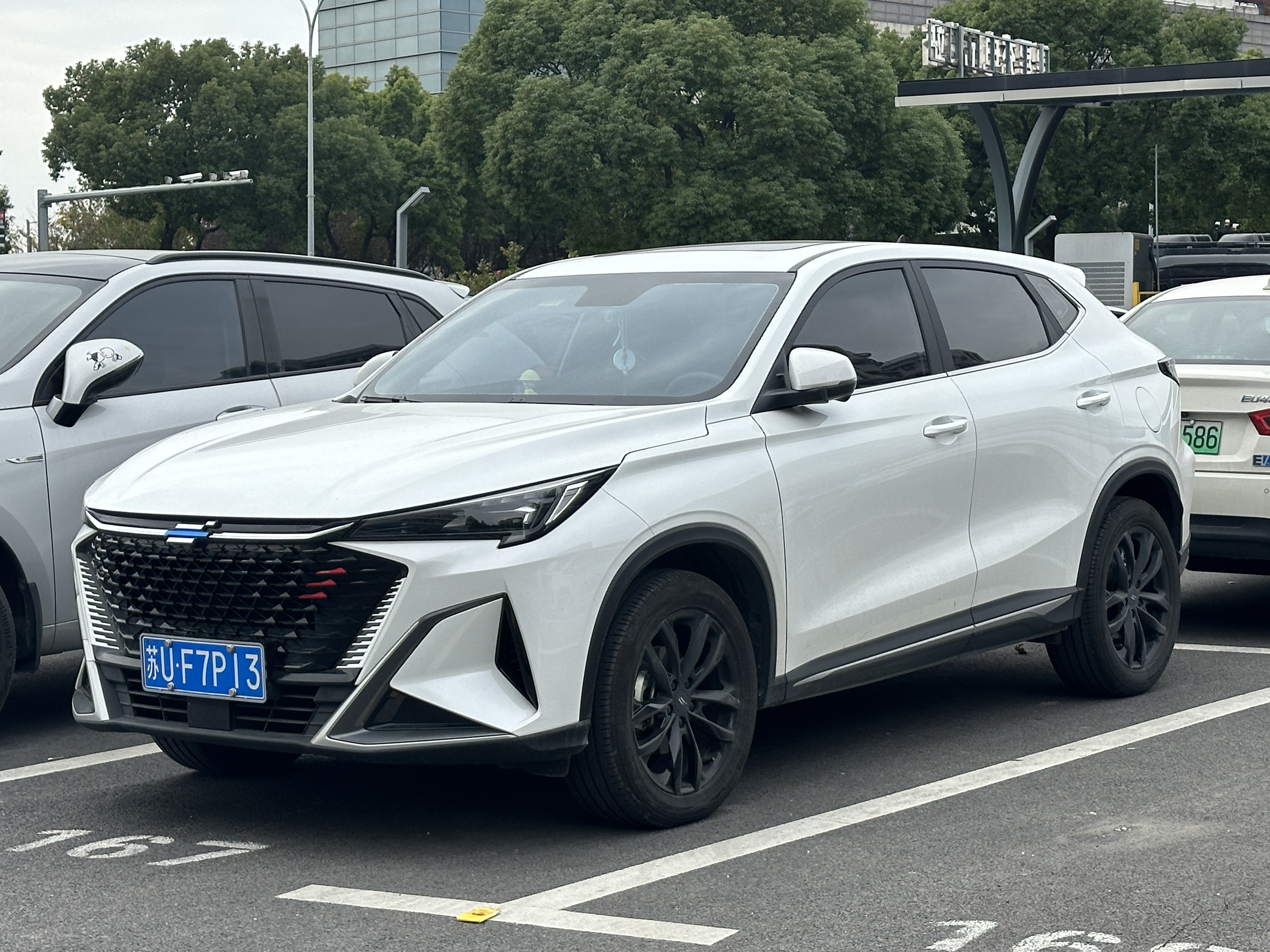
Oshan X5 Plus

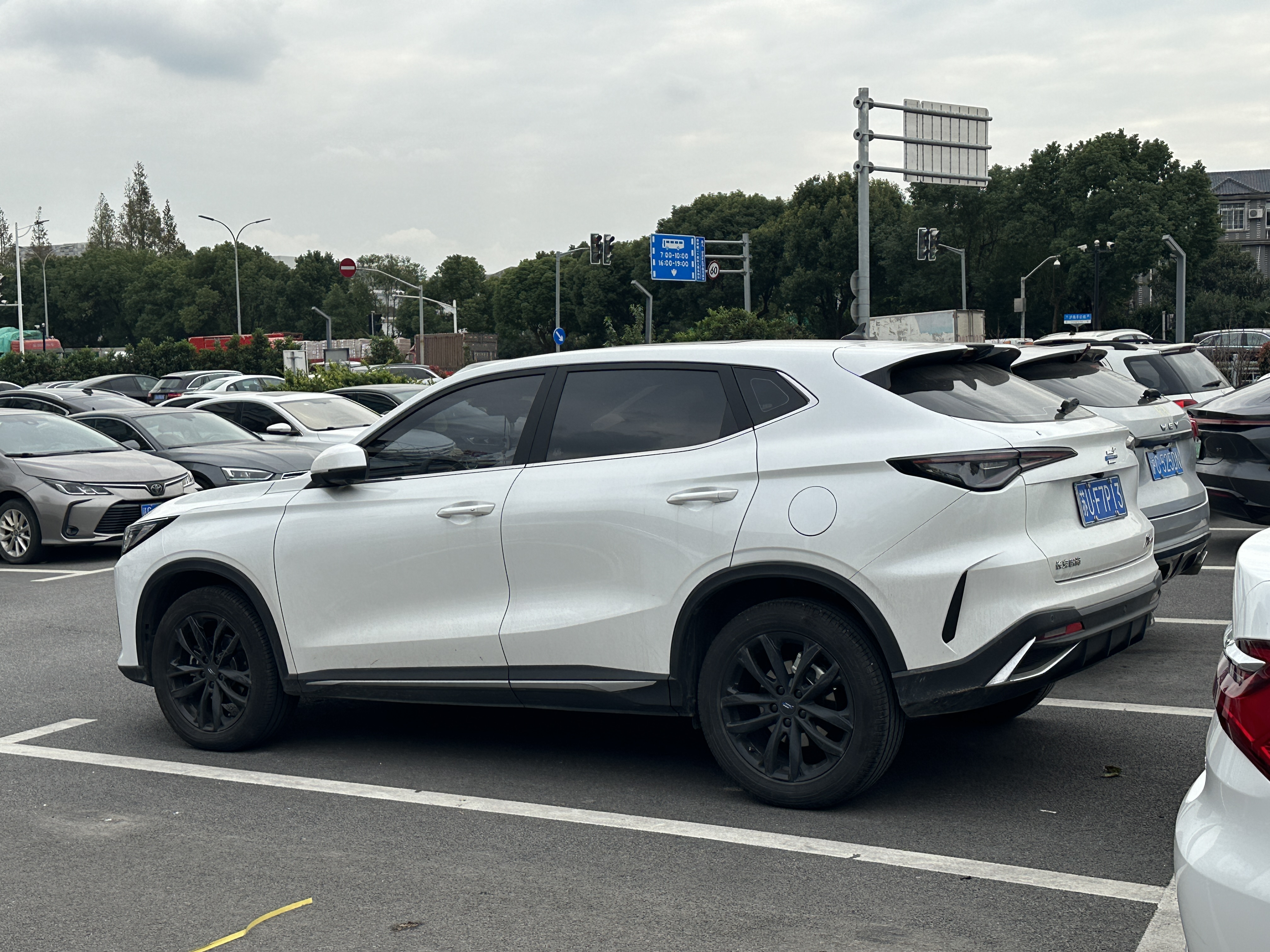
Rear view

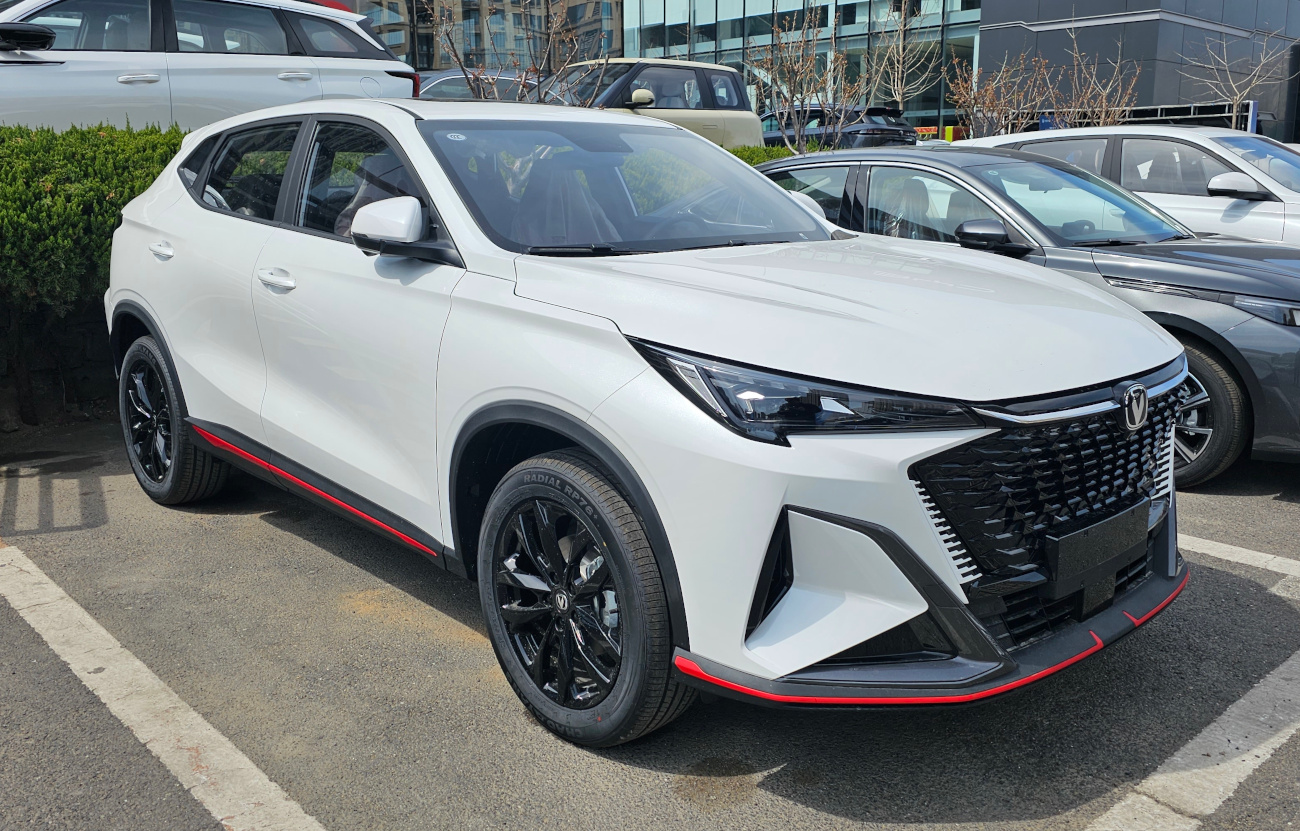
Changan X5 Plus

== Sales ==
Year	China		
Year	Oshan X5	Oshan X5 Plus	Changan X5 Plus
2023	22,076	53,501	—
2024	488	31,503	32,534
2025	—	9,365	69,535
