= BMW 6 Series (F12) =

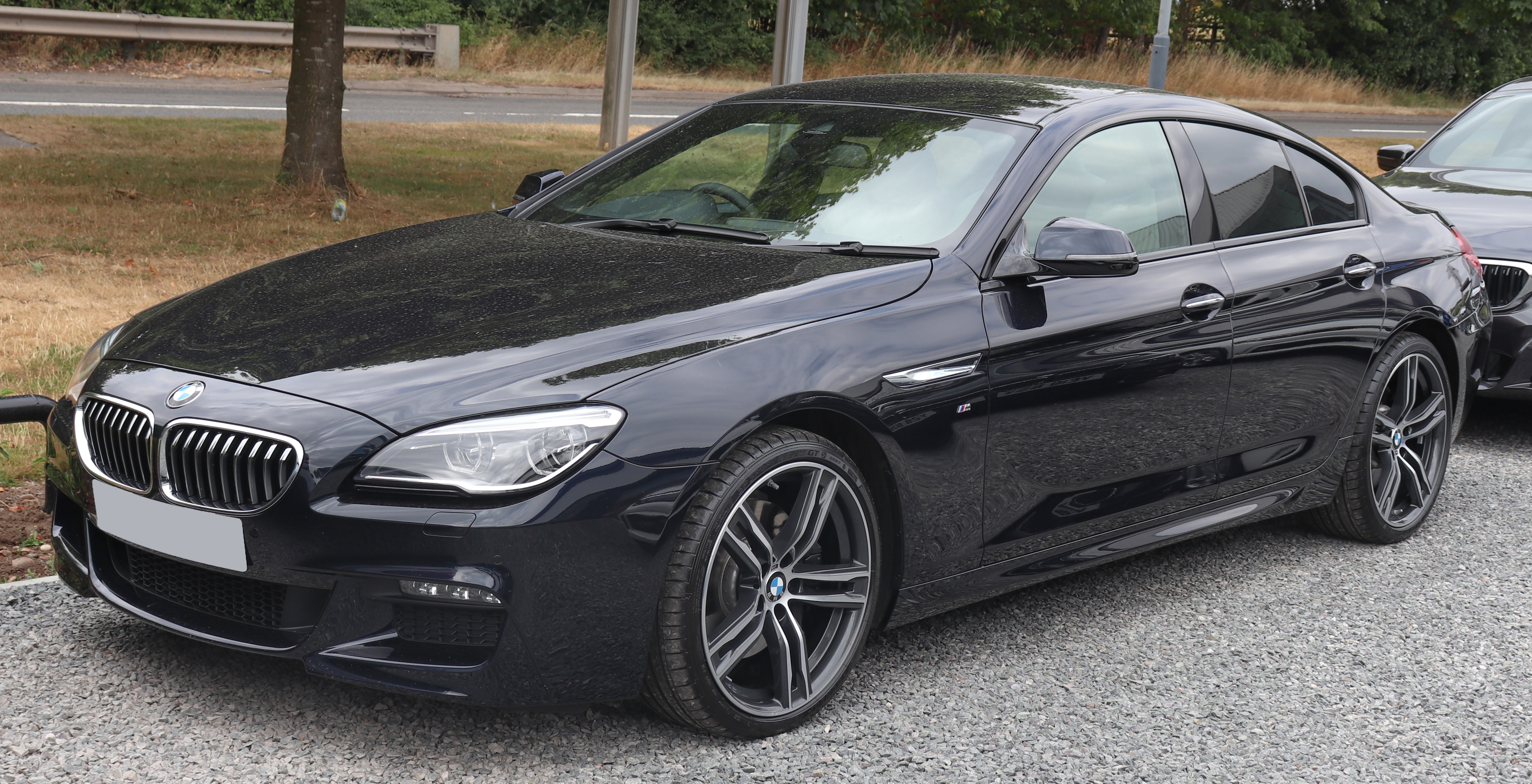

Overview
- Manufacturer: BMW
- Model code: F12 (Convertible); F13 (Coupé); F06 (Gran Coupé)
- Production: March 2011 – September 2018
- Assembly: Germany: Dingolfing
- Designer: Nader Faghihzadeh

Body and chassis
- Class: Grand tourer (S) (coupé/convertible); Executive car (E) (Gran Coupé)
- Body style: 2-door convertible; 2-door coupé; 4-door sedan
- Layout: Rear-wheel drive, All-wheel-drive
- Platform: BMW L6
- Related: BMW 7 Series (F01); BMW 5 Series (F10)

Powertrain
- Engine: Petrol: 3.0 L N55 turbo I6; 4.4 L N63/S63 twin-turbo V8; Diesel: 3.0 L N57 twin-turbo I6

Dimensions
- Wheelbase: F12: 2,855 mm (112.4 in); F13: 2,855 mm (112.4 in); F06: 2,968 mm (116.9 in)
- Length: F12: 4,894 mm (192.7 in); F13: 4,894 mm (192.7 in); F06: 5,007 mm (197.1 in)
- Width: 1,894 mm (74.6 in)
- Height: 1,365–1,392 mm (53.7–54.8 in)

Chronology
- Predecessor: BMW 6 Series (E63)
- Successor: BMW 8 Series (G15) (for body style and class), BMW 6 Series (G32) (for 6 series nameplate)

The third generation of the BMW 6 Series consists of the BMW F12 (two-door convertible version), BMW F13 (two-door coupé version) BMW F06 (four-door "Gran Coupé" version) executive-sized grand tourers. The F12/F13/F06 generation was produced from 2011 to 2018 and is often collectively referred to as the F12.

The F12 shares a platform and many features with the F10 5 Series and F01 7 Series, with the two-door F12/13 models having a shorter wheelbase than the F10, while the four-door F06's wheelbase matches the F10's.

The M6 versions are powered by the S63 twin-turbocharged V8 engine mated to a 7-speed dual clutch transmission. It is the first M6 model to use a turbocharged engine.

Production of the F12 generation ended, first with the Coupé in February 2017, then the convertible in February 2018, and finally Gran Coupé models which were discontinued in September 2018. The successor to the F12, the BMW 8 Series (G15), began production in June 2018. The 6 Series nameplate was re-used for the BMW 6 Series Gran Turismo (G32) which is still executive-sized being based upon the contemporary 5 Series (G30) and has features of a four-door coupé like frameless doors and sloping rear roofline; however unlike the F06 Gran Coupé which is a sedan the G32 Gran Turismo is a 5-door liftback succeeding the BMW 5 Series Gran Turismo (F07).

== Development and launch ==
The new 6 Series was first shown as the "BMW Concept 6 Series" coupé concept car at the 2010 Paris Motor Show. The exterior was designed by Nader Faghihzadeh, and the interior by Christian Bauer.

Unusually for BMW, the production version of the convertible was released before the coupé. The convertible version was officially introduced in January at the 2011 North American International Auto Show, while the coupé was introduced in April at the Shanghai Auto Show and New York Auto Show. The Gran Coupé was introduced at the 2012 New York Auto Show and the 2012 Geneva Motor Show.

Initial models included the 640i and 650i, while 640d and 650i xDrive models were later added to the lineup. The kerb weight of the model range is 1,715–1,985 kg (3,781–4,376 lb).

== Body styles ==
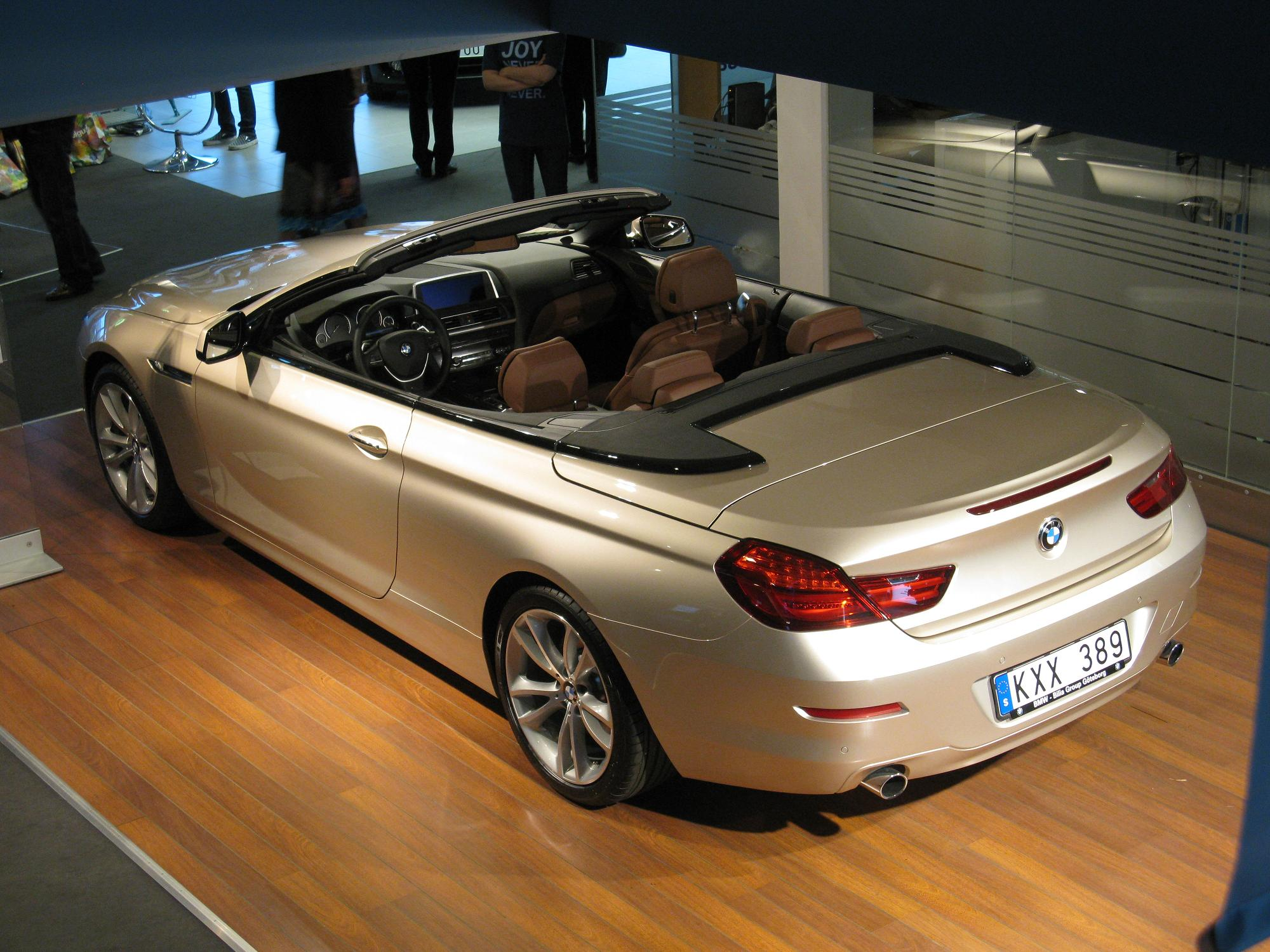
F12 convertible

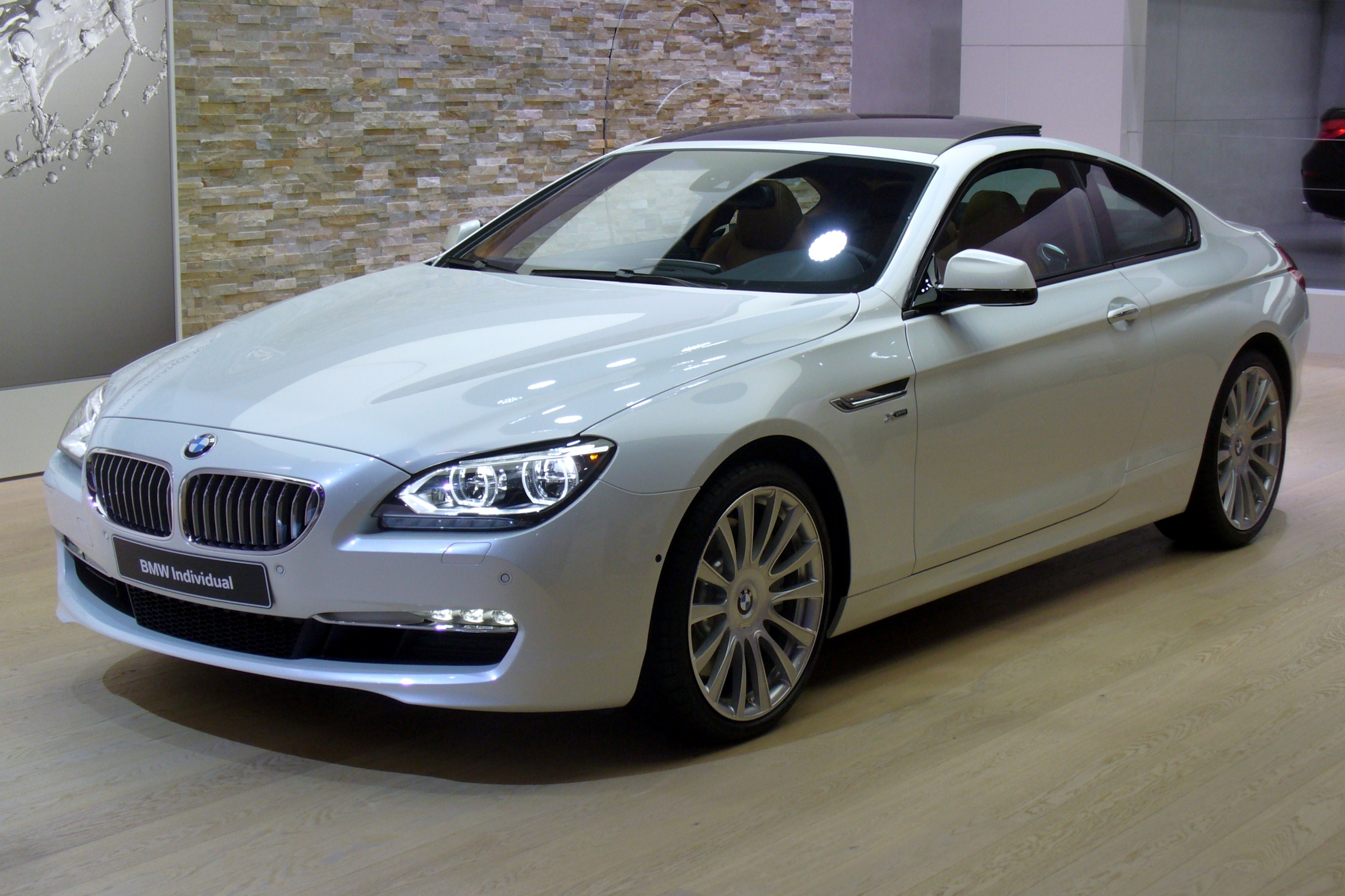
F13 coupé

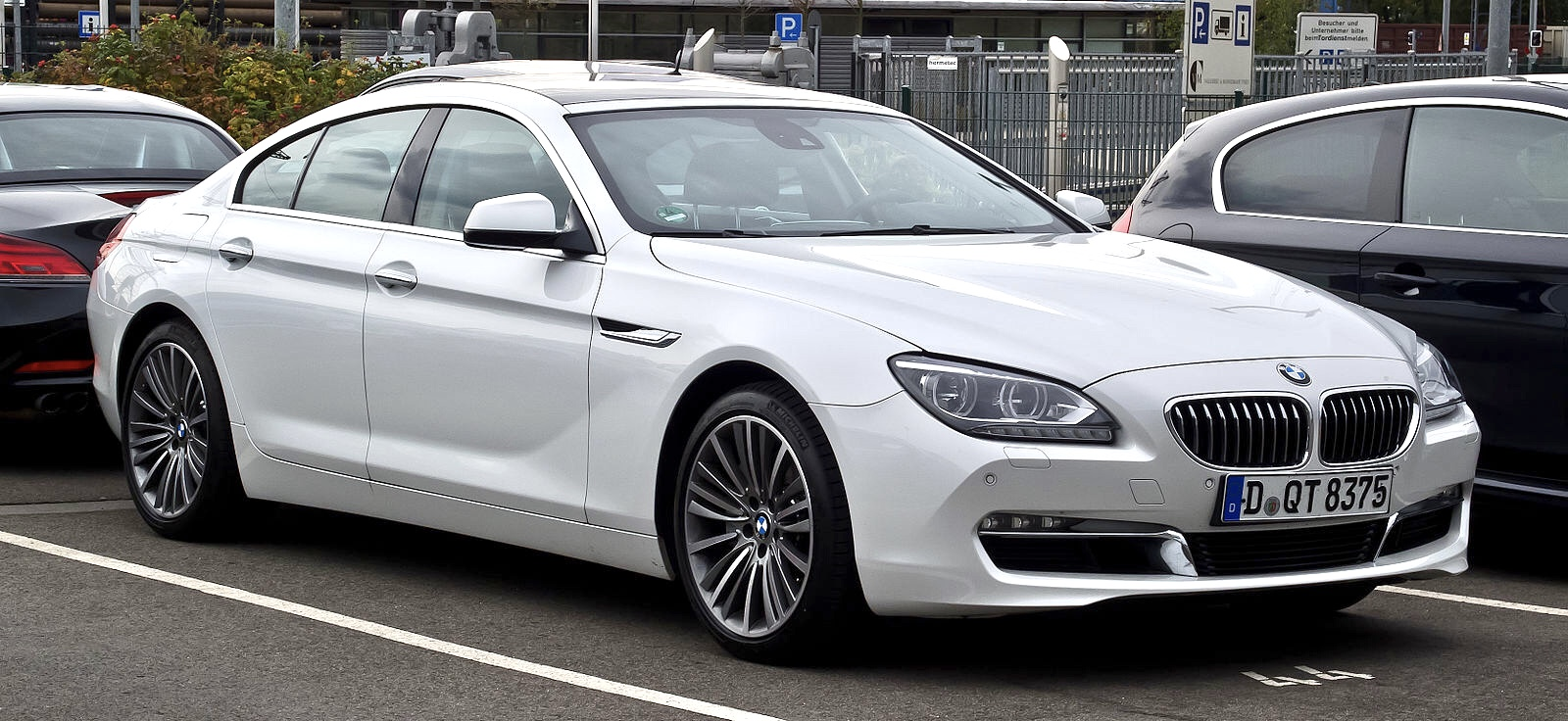
F06 Gran Coupé

=== Convertible (F12) ===
The first convertible models were released in March 2011 and were produced until May 2018.

=== Coupé (F13) ===
The first coupé models were released in June 2011 and were produced until October 2017.

=== Gran Coupé (F06) ===
The F06 Gran Coupé is the four-door coupé variant of the 6 Series, and was launched in March 2012 at the Geneva International Motor Show. The design of the Gran Coupé was inspired by the 2007 BMW CS Concept.

The wheelbase of the Gran Coupé is 117 mm (4.6 in) longer than the F13 coupé, and the same length as the BMW F10 5 Series. Compared with the F13 coupé, the body is 112 mm (4.4 in) longer, and 23 mm (0.9 in) taller. The Gran Coupé has a 4+1 seating arrangement, meaning there are two full-size rear seats, and one smaller rear middle seat. Compared to the F01 7 Series, the Gran Coupe has a larger trunk (16.2 cubic feet versus 14 cubic feet) less headroom in the back seats due to the sloping rear roof line.

Production of the Gran Coupe models began in March 2012 and ended in September 2018. Although production ended in the fall of 2018, the F06 Gran Coupe was available in the 2019 model year.

== Engines ==
Top speed for all models is electronically limited to 250 km/h (155 mph).

=== Petrol ===
Model	Years	Engine	Power	Torque	0–100 km/h (0–62 mph)
640i	2011–2018	3.0 L N55 inline-6 turbo	235 kW (315 hp) at 5,800–6,000 rpm	450 N⋅m (332 lb⋅ft) at 1,300–4,500 rpm	5.4 s
650i	2011–2013	4.4 L N63; V8 twin-turbo	300 kW (402 hp) at 5,500–6,400 rpm	600 N⋅m (443 lb⋅ft) at 1,750–4,500 rpm	4.7 s
650i	2013–2018	4.4 L N63; V8 twin-turbo	331 kW (444 hp) at 5,500–6,000 rpm	650 N⋅m (479 lb⋅ft) at 2,000–4,500 rpm	4.3 s
M6	2012–2018	4.4 L S63; V8 twin-turbo	412 kW (553 hp) at 6,000–7,000 rpm	680 N⋅m (502 lb⋅ft) at 1,500–5,750 rpm	4 s

=== Diesel ===
Model	Years	Engine	Power	Torque	0–100 km/h (0–62 mph)
640d	2011–2018	3.0 L N57 inline-6 twin-turbo	230 kW (308 hp) at 4,400 rpm	630 N⋅m (465 lb⋅ft) at 1,500–2,500 rpm	5.4 s

== Transmissions ==
Most models were only available with an 8-speed automatic transmission. The M6 was available with a 7-speed dual-clutch transmission (called "M-DCT"), and a 6-speed manual transmission in the United States.

The automatic transmissions consist of:

- 8-speed ZF 8HP45Z automatic (640i)
- 8-speed ZF 8HP70Z automatic (640d / 650i)
- 7-speed Getrag GS7-D36BG dual-clutch automatic (M6)

The manual transmission option was a consists of:

- 6-speed Getrag GS6-53BZ (650i / M6 models in US markets only)

== Equipment ==
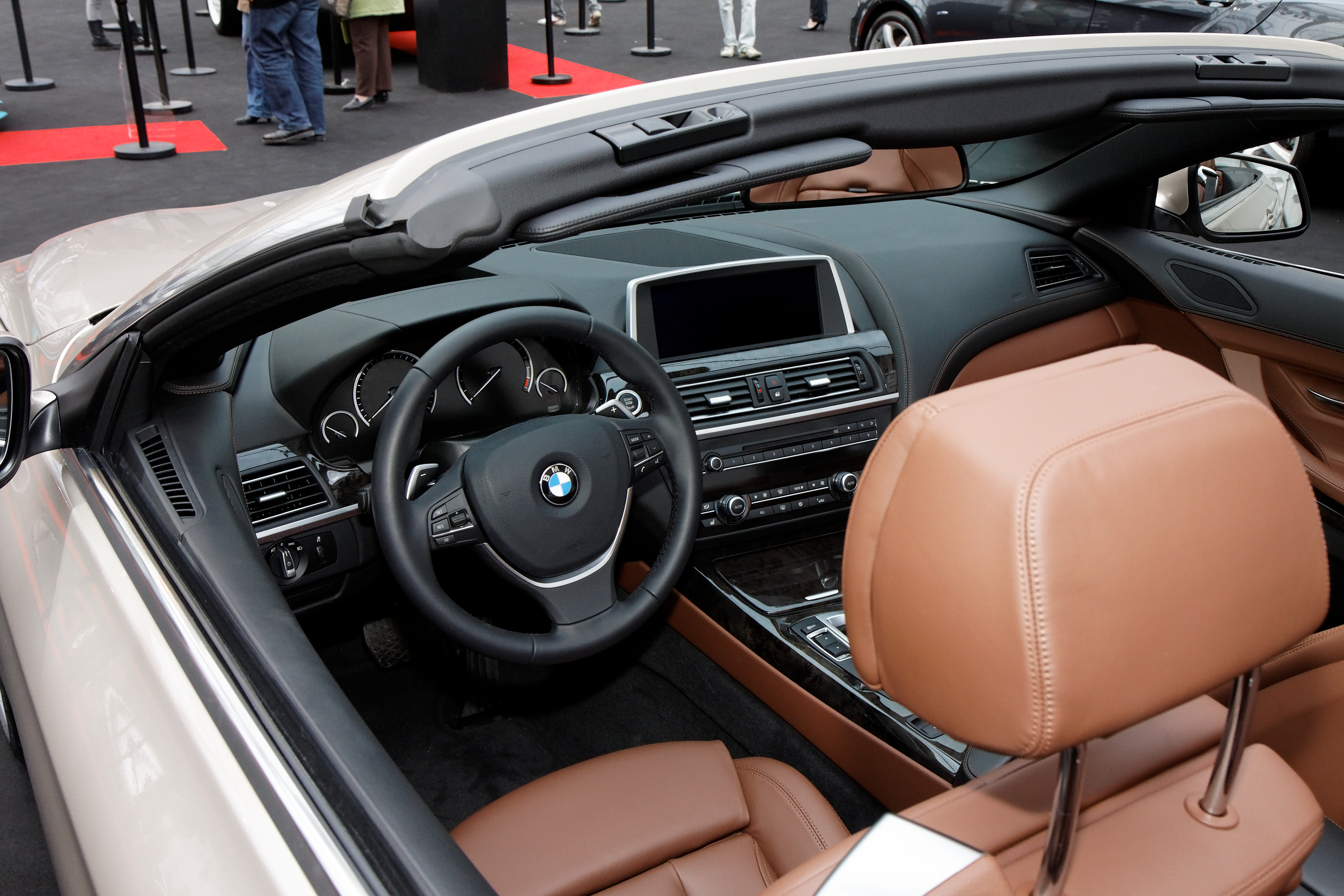
Interior (pre-facelift)

The F06/F12/F13 6 Series introduced selectable driving modes with ECO PRO, Comfort, and Sport, affecting the acceleration, transmission shift points, and climate control system.

Convertible models feature sun reflective front seats, and Gran Coupé models feature 60:40 split-folding rear seats. 6 Series models are also available with the M Sport package, featuring M exterior and interior styling, LED foglights, 19-inch alloy wheels, sports seats, and an Alcantara interior. Additional options include automatic parking, a Bang & Olufsen surround sound speaker system, and all-wheel drive (xDrive).

M Performance Parts can be fitted to all models. These include black grilles, carbon fibre mirrors, a sport exhaust system, M rims, sport pedals, a sport steering wheel and a carbon fibre gear selector.

== M6 model ==
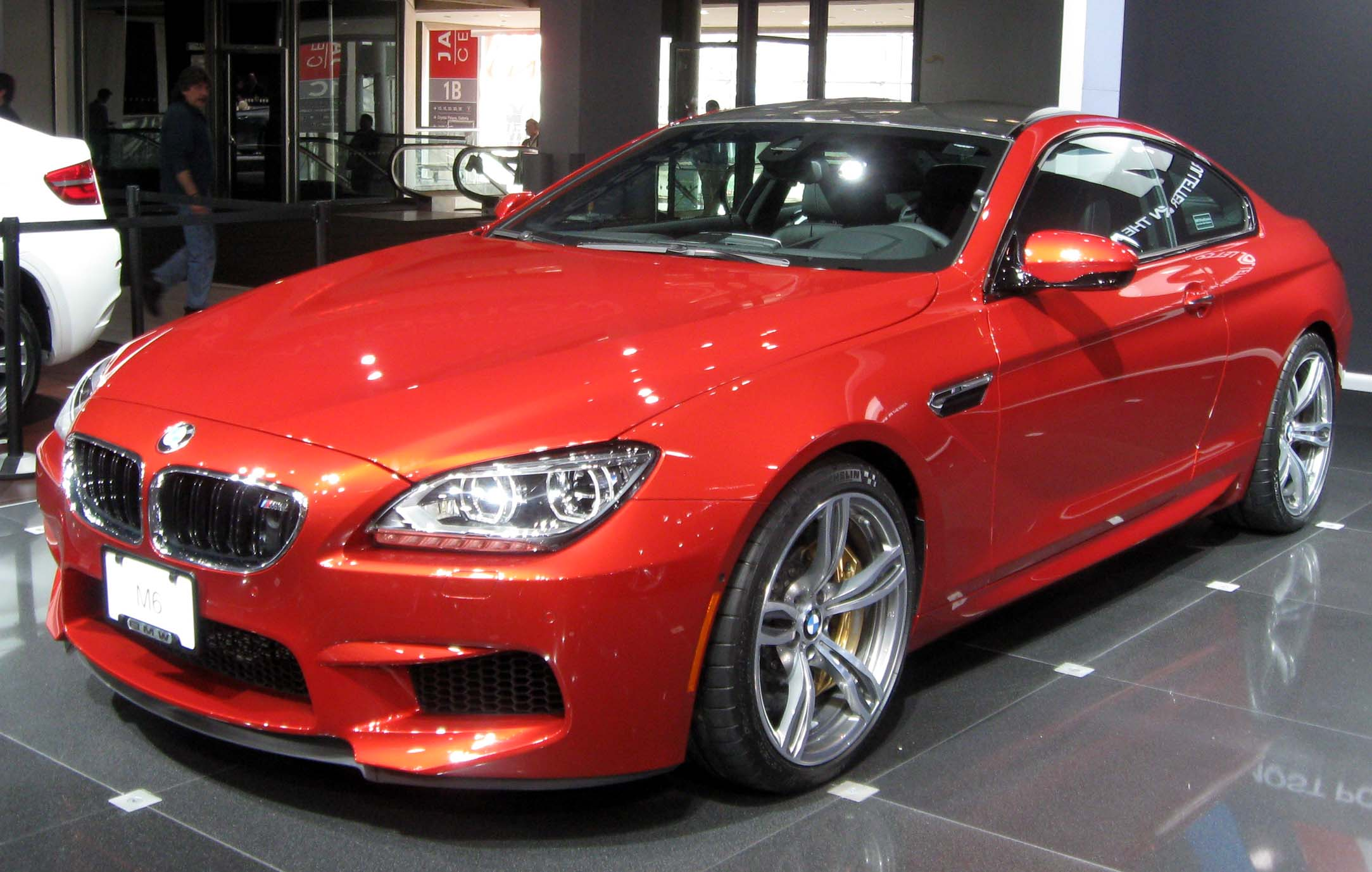
F13 M6 coupé

The M6 version was produced in convertible (F12), coupé (F13) and four-door coupé (F06) body styles. It was launched in the coupé body style alongside the standard 6 Series Gran Coupé at the 2012 Geneva Motor Show, and at the Auto Mobil International Leipzig in convertible form.

It is powered by the S63 4.4 litre twin-turbo V8. In most countries, the only transmission offered was a Getrag 7-speed dual-clutch transmission (called "M-DCT"). In the United States, a 6-speed manual transmission was also available.

Compared to the standard car, the M6 features M-styling, merino leather upholstery, an M-specific head-up display, and a carbon fibre roof.

== Alpina B6 ==
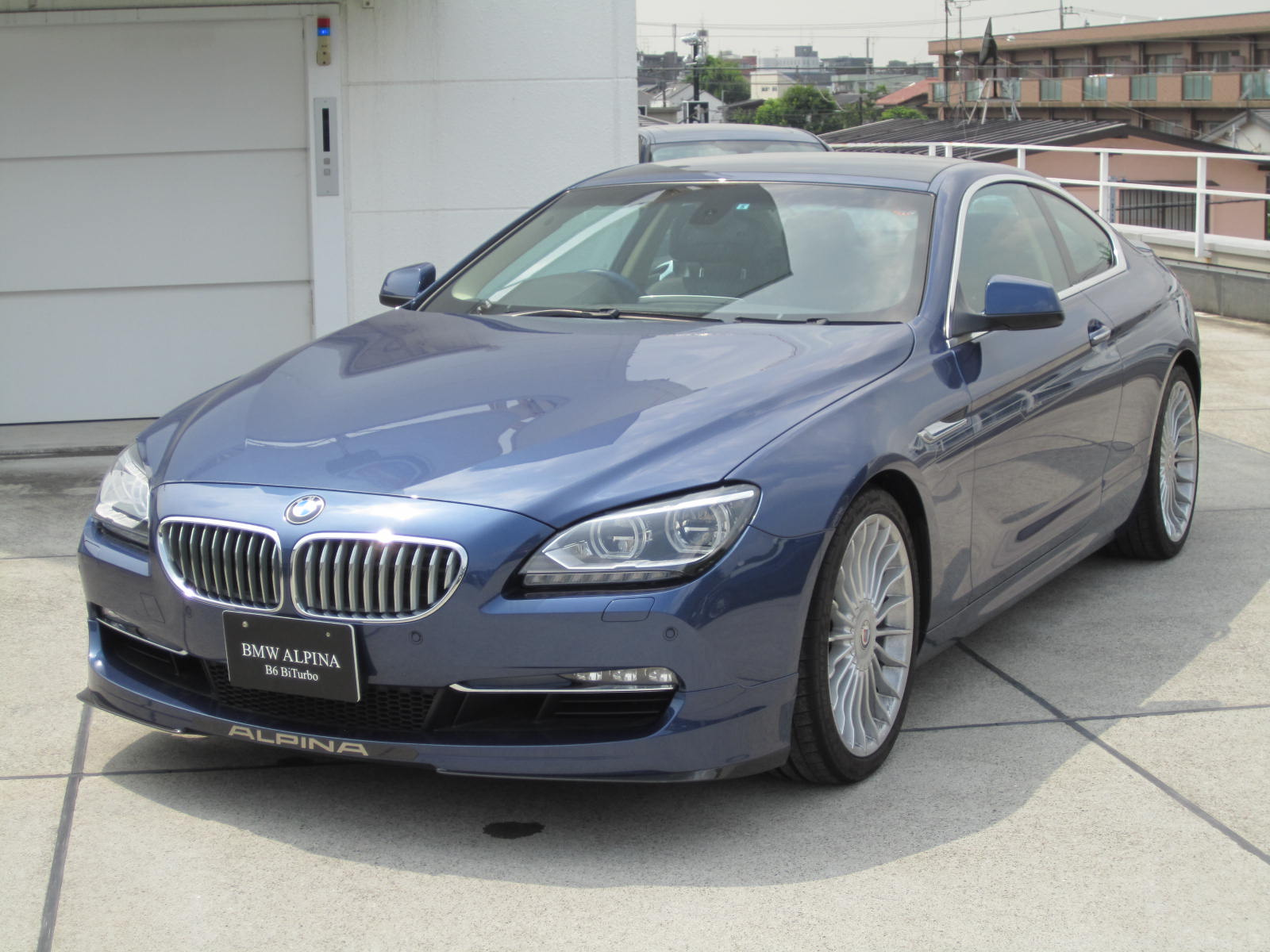
2014 Alpina B6 Bi-Turbo

The Alpina B6 Gran Coupé xDrive was launched in 2014 and is a high performance model based on the 650i. It shares the 4.4-litre twin-turbo V8 found in the B5 BiTurbo rated at 397 kW (532 hp) and 730 N⋅m (538 lb⋅ft), with a top speed of 318 km/h (198 mph). B6 models receive 20-inch alloy wheels, aerodynamic elements, and exclusive trim and paint options. In 2015, the B6 was refreshed and received performance improvements of 59 kW (79 hp) and 70 N⋅m (52 lb⋅ft), and now had a top speed of 324 km/h (201 mph).

The B6 was manufactured alongside the regular 6 Series in Dingolfing, and was then completed with remaining components at the Alpina factory in Buchloe, Bavaria. Alpina independently sells the B6 in most countries. However, the B6 is sold by BMW in the United States and Canada alongside BMW's own M6; with the M6 being sportier and more responsive (due to its dual-clutch transmission, turbochargers, and lighter weight being rear-wheel drive only) while the B6 is geared more towards on-road driving rather than the racetrack.

== Yearly changes ==
=== 2012 ===
- F06 Gran Coupé body style introduced.
- All-wheel drive (called "xDrive" by BMW) models introduced.
- Traffic sign recognition upgraded to include warnings about overtaking restrictions (called "No Passing Info" by BMW).
- 650i engine upgraded to N63TU which added variable valve lift (called "Valvetronic" by BMW).

=== 2013 ===
- Launch control and engine coasting in ECO PRO mode introduced for models with the 8-speed automatic transmission.
- Intelligent Emergency Call with vehicle location and accident severity detection becomes a standard feature.
- 640d xDrive Gran Coupé and 640i xDrive models are introduced.
- Optional night vision system upgraded and features animal recognition.

=== 2015 facelift ===
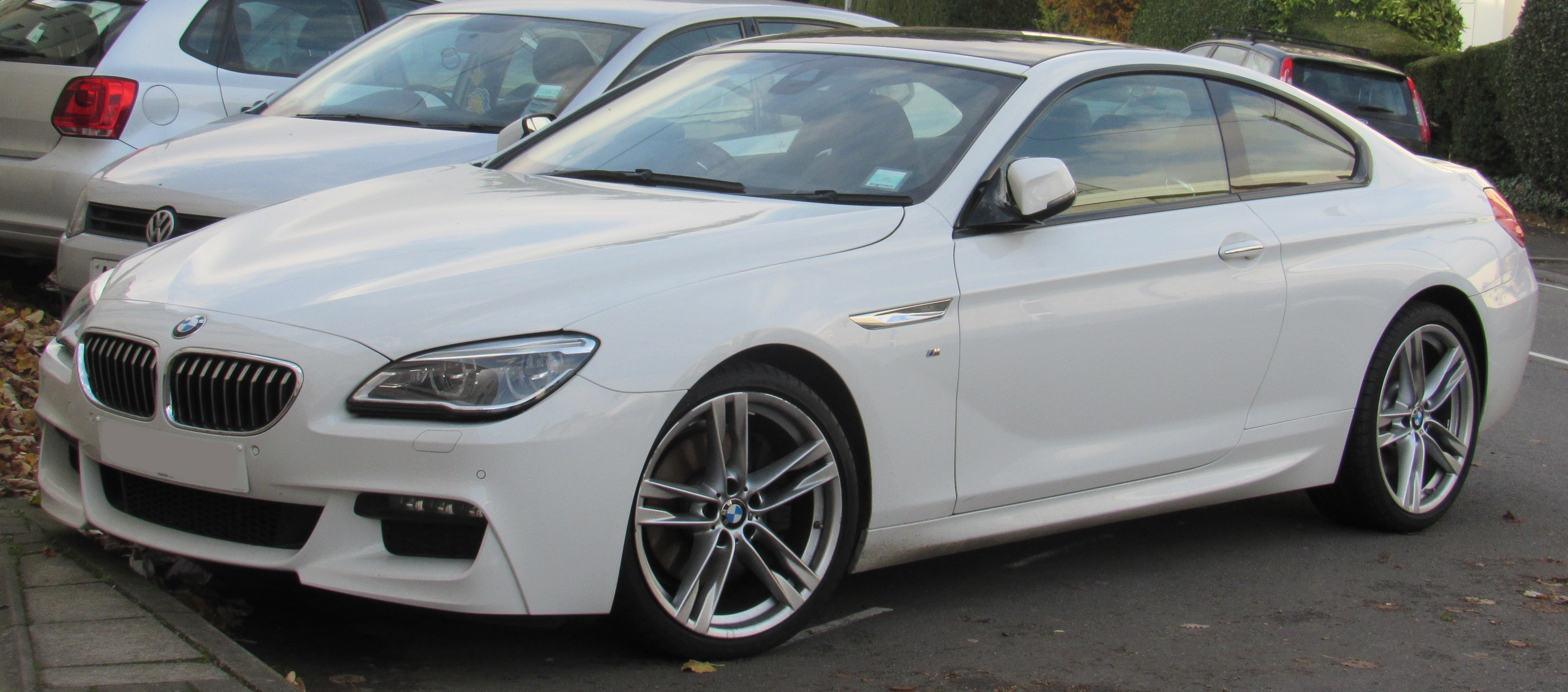
2015 facelift (coupé)

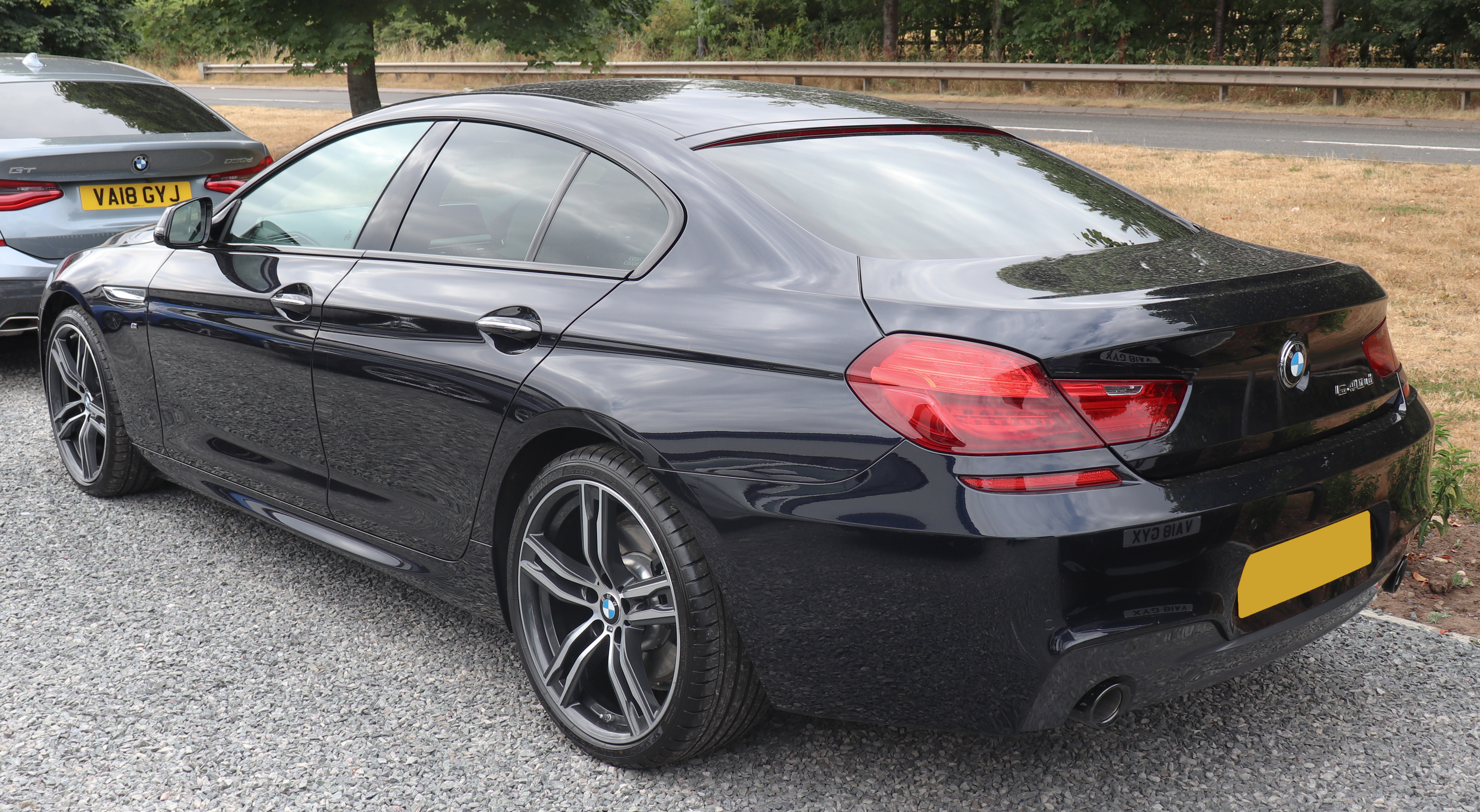
2015 facelift (Gran Coupé)

At the 2015 Detroit Auto Show, BMW introduced the F06/F12/F13 facelift ("LCI") models:

- Exterior changes include redesigned hood, front and rear bumpers, LED fog-lights, adaptive LED headlights, turn signals on the wing mirrors, revised wheel design, and new paint colours.
- All models were available with xDrive and met the EU6 Exhaust Emissions standard. Fuel economy figures were improved. Additional ride comfort settings were added to the electronically adjustable dampers.

=== 2016 ===
- Models feature an updated iDrive system with a 10.2-inch touch-sensitive glass display.

=== 2017 ===
- Production of Coupé models was discontinued in February.
- Models now available with iDrive 5 with Professional Navigation.

=== 2018 ===
- Production of Convertible models was discontinued in February, while Gran Coupé models was discontinued in September.

=== 2019 ===
- Gran Coupé remained on sale for the 2019 model year with some standard features added, being sold alongside the BMW 6 Series Gran Turismo (G32). Both the Gran Coupé (final year of sale, as production ceased in 2018) and the Gran Turismo (which continued to be available outside the USA) were discontinued in the USA market after the 2019 model year.

== Production volumes ==
The F12/F13/F06 6 Series was produced at the Dingolfing BMW plant.

The following are production figures for the F12/F13/F06:

Year	Total
2011	9,396
2012	23,193
2013	27,687
2014	23,988
2015	20,962
2016	13,400
2017	11,052
Total:	129,678

== Awards ==
- 2011 Red Dot Award (6 Series Convertible)
- 2011 Good Design Award (6 Series Coupé and Convertible)
- 2012 iF Gold Award for Outstanding Design (6 Series Coupé)
- 2012 iF Product Design Award (6 Series Convertible)
- 2012 Red Dot Award (BMW 6 Series Coupé and Gran Coupé)
