= BMW B57 =

Car engine

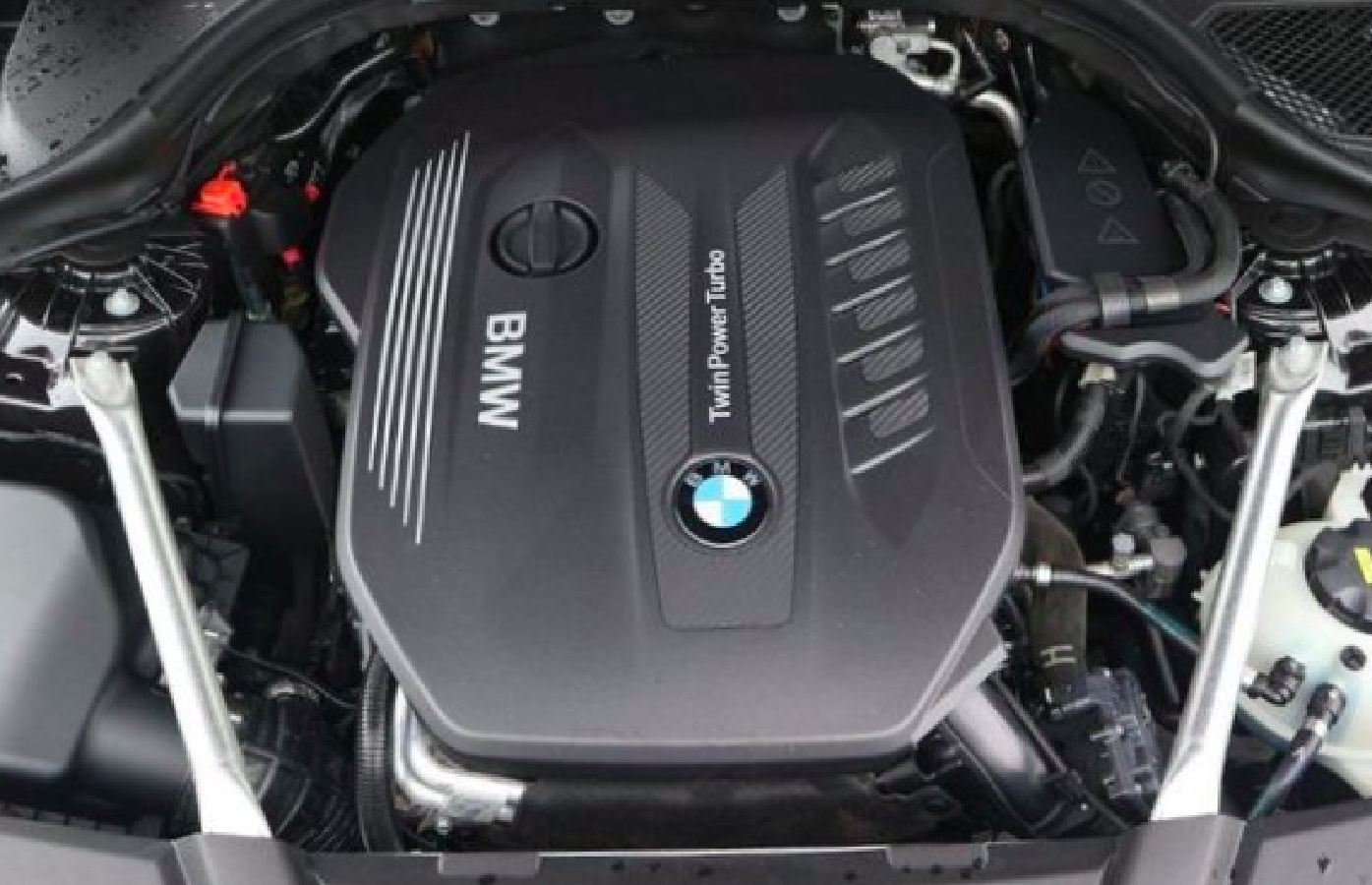

Overview
- Manufacturer: BMW
- Production: July 2015 – present

Layout
- Configuration: Straight-6
- Displacement: 3.0 L; 182.6 cu in (2,993 cc)
- Cylinder bore: 84 mm (3.31 in)
- Piston stroke: 90 mm (3.54 in)
- Cylinder block material: Aluminium alloy
- Valvetrain: DOHC 4 valves x cyl.
- Compression ratio: 16.0:1 (B57D30C), 16.5:1

Combustion
- Turbocharger: Single, dual or quad
- Fuel system: Common rail direct injection
- Fuel type: Diesel fuel DIN EN 590
- Oil system: Wet sump, pressurized circulation
- Cooling system: Water-cooled

Output
- Power output: 195–294 kW (261–394 hp)
- Torque output: 620–760 N⋅m (457–561 lb⋅ft)

Chronology
- Predecessor: BMW N57

The BMW B57 is a turbo-diesel straight-six engine, produced by BMW since 2015.

== Design ==
The B57 belongs to a family of modular engines, including the B37 and B47 diesel engines, and B38, B48, and B58 petrol engines. The engines utilise a common displacement of 500 cc (31 cu in) per cylinder. The B57 replaced the previous N57 diesel engine, and was first introduced in the G11 7 Series. The B57 is available in configurations of up to 4 turbochargers, that operate in a double-series layout. In addition to BMW's own brand vehicles, the BMW B57 is also used in a diesel variant of the Ineos Grenadier.

== Models ==
Engine	Power	Torque	Years
B57D30O0	195 kW (261 hp) at 4,000 rpm	620 N⋅m (457 lb⋅ft) at 2,000–2,500 rpm	2015–
B57D30T0	235 kW (315 hp) at 4,000 rpm	680 N⋅m (502 lb⋅ft) at 1,750–2,250 rpm	2015–
B57D30S0	294 kW (394 hp) at 4,400 rpm	760 N⋅m (561 lb⋅ft) at 2,000–3,000 rpm	2016–2020

=== B57D30O0 (Single turbo) ===
- 2015–2022 G11 730d, 730Ld
- 2017–2023 G30 530d
- 2017–2023 G32 630d Gran Turismo
- 2017–present G01 X3 xDrive30d
- 2018–present G02 X4 xDrive30d
- 2018–present G05 X5 xDrive30d
- 2018–present G07 X7 xDrive30d
- 2019–present G20 330d
- 2019–present G06 X6 xDrive30d
- 2022–present Ineos Grenadier (down-tuned to 183 kW (245hp; 249 PS); 550 N·m (406 lb·ft))

=== B57D30T0 (Twin turbo) ===
- 2015–2022 G11 740d, 740Ld
- 2017–2023 G30 540d
- 2017–2023 G32 640d xDrive Gran Turismo
- 2018–present G01 X3 M40d
- 2018–present G02 X4 M40d
- 2018–present G15 840d xDrive
- 2020–present G20 M340d xDrive
- 2020–present G21 M340d xDrive
- 2020–present G22 M440d xDrive
- 2020–present G07 X7 xDrive40d

=== B57D30S0 (Quad turbo) ===
- 2016–2020 G11 750d, 750Ld
- 2017–2020 G30 M550d xDrive
- 2018–2020 G05 X5 M50d
- 2018–2020 G07 X7 M50d
- 2019–2020 G06 X6 M50d
