= BMW 6 Series (G32) =

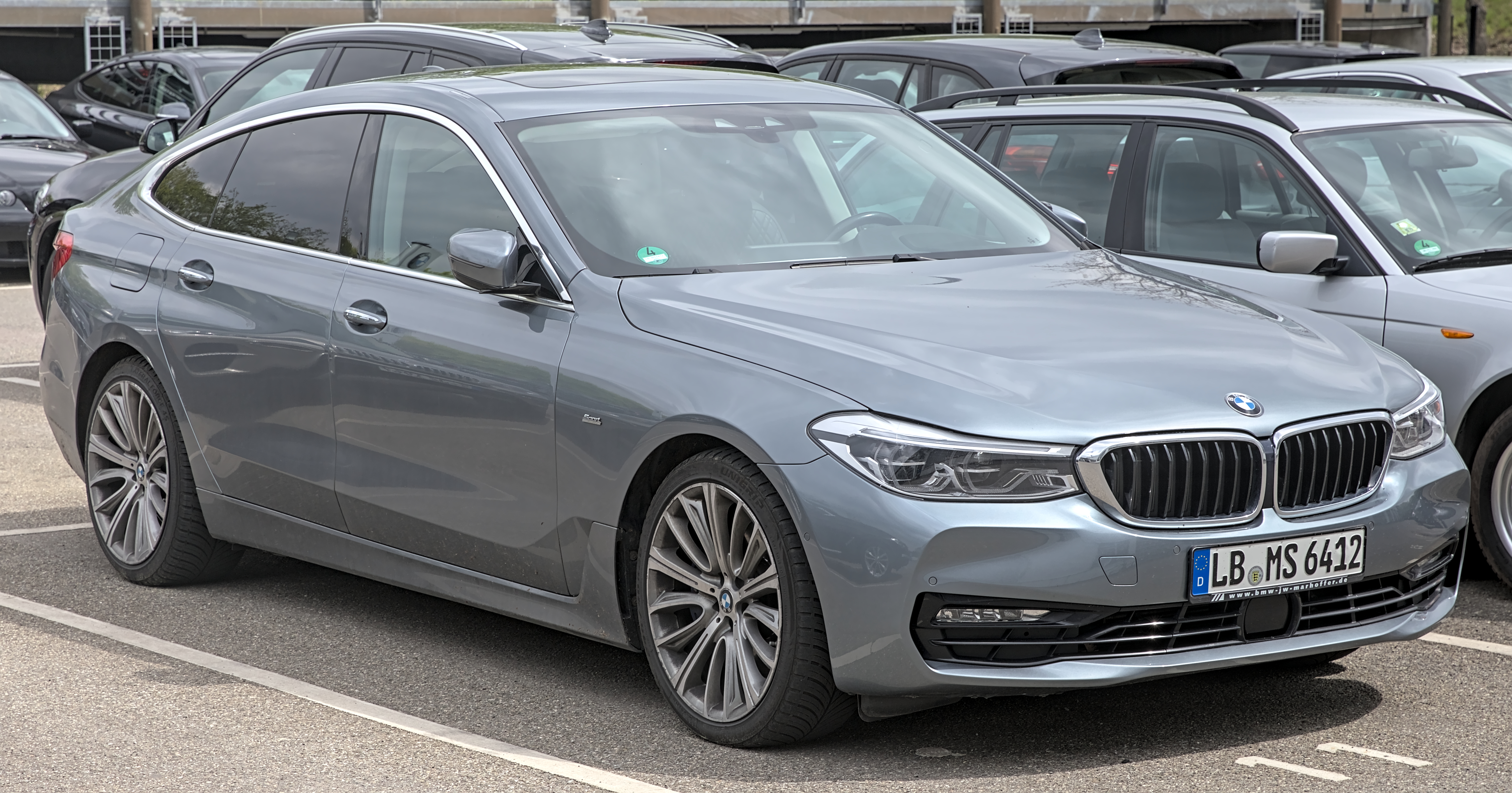

Overview
- Manufacturer: BMW
- Model code: G32
- Production: 2017–2023
- Assembly: Germany: Dingolfing; Malaysia: Kulim (Inokom); India: Chennai (BMW India)
- Designer: Hussein Al-Attar

Body and chassis
- Class: Executive car (E)
- Body style: 5-door liftback
- Layout: FR layout / F4 layout (xDrive)
- Platform: Cluster Architecture (CLAR)
- Related: BMW 5 Series (G30)

Powertrain
- Engine: 2.0 L B48 I4 turbocharged (petrol); 2.0 L B47 I4 turbocharged (diesel); 3.0 L B58 I6 turbocharged (petrol); 3.0 L B57 I6 turbocharged (diesel)
- Transmission: 8-speed ZF 8HP Steptronic automatic
- Hybrid drivetrain: Mild Hybrid

Dimensions
- Wheelbase: 3,070 mm (120.9 in)
- Length: 5,091 mm (200.4 in)
- Width: 1,902 mm (74.9 in)
- Height: 1,538 mm (60.6 in)
- Kerb weight: 1,720–1,935 kg (3,792–4,266 lb)

Chronology
- Predecessor: BMW 5 Series Gran Turismo; BMW 6 Series Gran Coupe
- Successor: BMW 5 Series (G68)

The G32 BMW 6 Series Gran Turismo is the second generation of the BMW Gran Turismo range of 5-door liftback executive cars launched in 2017, based upon the BMW 5 Series (G30). The 6 Series Gran Turismo is the successor to the BMW 5 Series Gran Turismo (F07) that was based upon the 5 Series (F10). A facelifted version of the 6 Series Gran Turismo was unveiled alongside the facelifted 5 Series on 27 May 2020. For 2021, all engines are 48 volt mild hybrids, assisted with a belt alternator starter. The 6 Series Gran Turismo was discontinued in August 2023 with no successor.

The BMW 6 Series nameplate had previously been used on the F06/F12/F13 grand tourers produced from 2011–18, which are also executive-sized (and was based on the contemporary 5 Series (F10), and besides the two-door convertible/coupé also included a four-door (F06 Gran Coupé, which like the G32 Gran Turismo has features of a four-door coupé like frameless doors and sloping rear roofline). However, the F06/F12/F13 would be succeeded by the 8 Series (G15).

== Development and launch ==
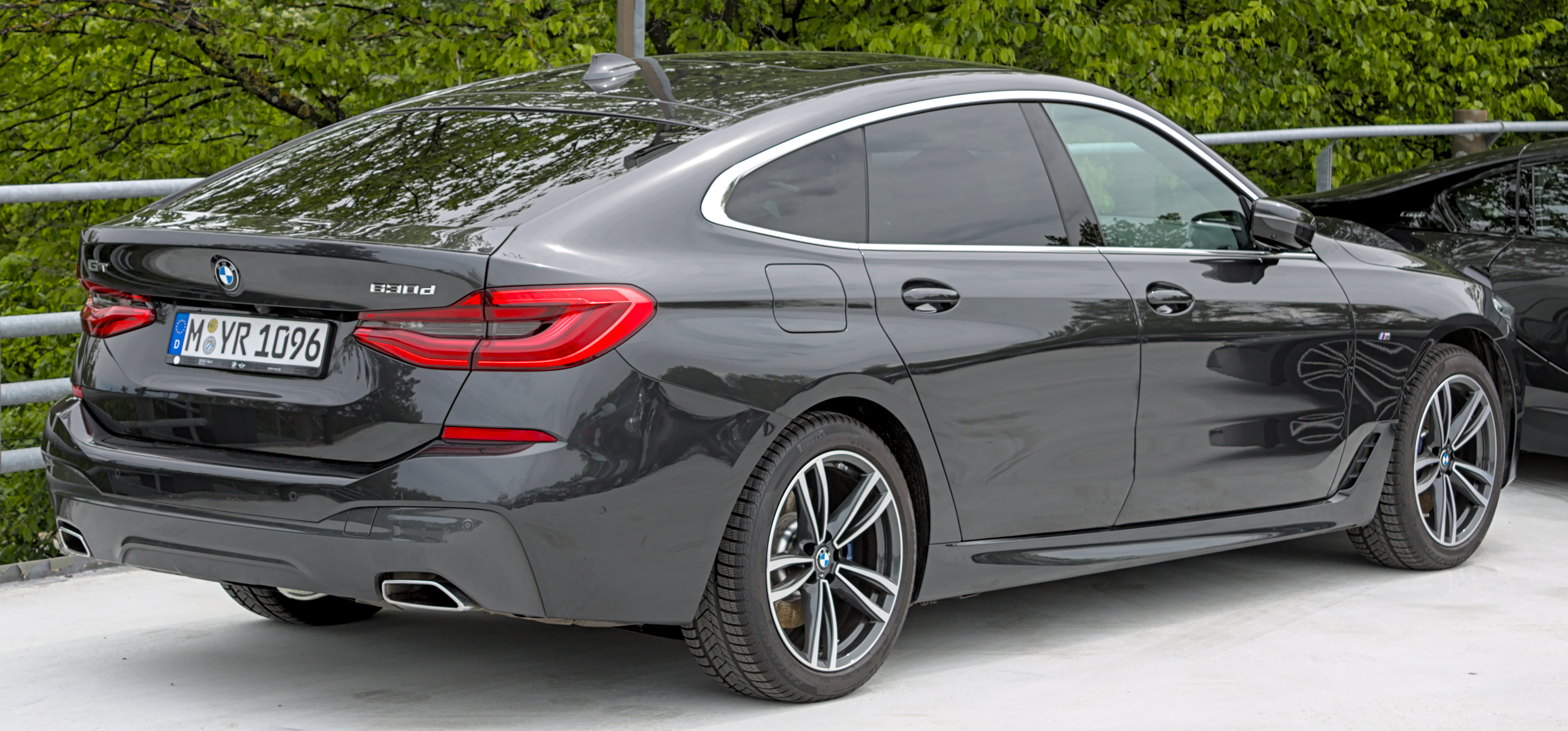
Rear view of 630d M Sport GT

Details of the 6 Series Gran Turismo were released online on June 14, 2017. The car was later officially unveiled at the 2017 Frankfurt International Auto Show in September. The exterior was designed by Hussein Al-Attar.

Compared to the 5 Series Gran Turismo, the body of the 6 Series is 87 mm (3.4 in) longer, 21 mm (0.83 in) lower, and 150 kg (330 lb) lighter. The rear load compartment is 110 L (3.9 cu ft) larger at 610 L (22 cu ft). The 6 Series Gran Turismo is based on the modular Cluster Architecture (CLAR) platform and comes with self-levelling air suspension as a standard feature. The car automatically lowers by 9.9 mm (0.39 in) when travelling at speeds over 120 km/h (75 mph).

Initial models include two petrol engines, the 630i and 640i as well as the 630d which is one of the two diesel engines. The 640d is the second diesel model, which was released later in September 2017. The newest and smallest engine for the 6 Series GT is the 620d. This engine is available since July 2018 and will be the entry-level version for this lineup. All models are available as an all-wheel drive (xDrive) version. The 640d model is available only with all-wheel drive. Unlike the contemporary 5 Series (G30), as well as the preceding 5 Series Gran Turismo (F07) and 6 Series Gran Coupé (F06), no V8 engine was offered for the 6 Series Gran Turismo.

=== Discontinuation ===
The only 6 Series GT to be sold in the USA was the 640i xDrive, for the 2018 and 2019 model year, as the previous 6 Series (the F06-based Gran Coupé) was also offered in the 2019 model year. Both the Gran Coupé (final year of sale, as production ceased in September 2018) and the Gran Turismo (which continued to be available outside the USA) were discontinued in the USA market after the 2019 model year.

The 6 Series Gran Turismo (G32) was discontinued in August 2023 with no successor. While its looks were less awkward than the preceding 5 Series Gran Turismo (F07), both the F07 and G32 had a mixed reception due to the "higher roof [and] the eye-mugging rear" compared to the sleeker (but less practical) Audi A7. Although the practicality of the 6 Series Gran Turismo was lauded, it also faced internal competition from the BMW X5 and X6.

== Equipment ==
The 6 Series Gran Turismo comes with a 10.25-inch screen featuring the latest version of iDrive 6.0, and is available with gesture control. BMW Active Driving Assistant is a standard feature on all models, and includes safety features such as: blind spot monitoring, lane departure warning and speed limit information. The 6 Series GT also features adaptive headlights, and many sensors to assist parking and motorway driving.

== Transmissions ==
All models feature an 8-speed automatic transmission. The available transmissions are:

- 8-speed ZF 8HP50Z automatic (630i / 640i / 640i xDrive)
- 8-speed ZF 8HP75Z automatic (630d)
- 8-speed ZF 8HP75X automatic (630d xDrive / 640d xDrive)

Also features manual sequential mode as well as sport shifting which holds the gears longer and spins the turbochargers.

== Models ==
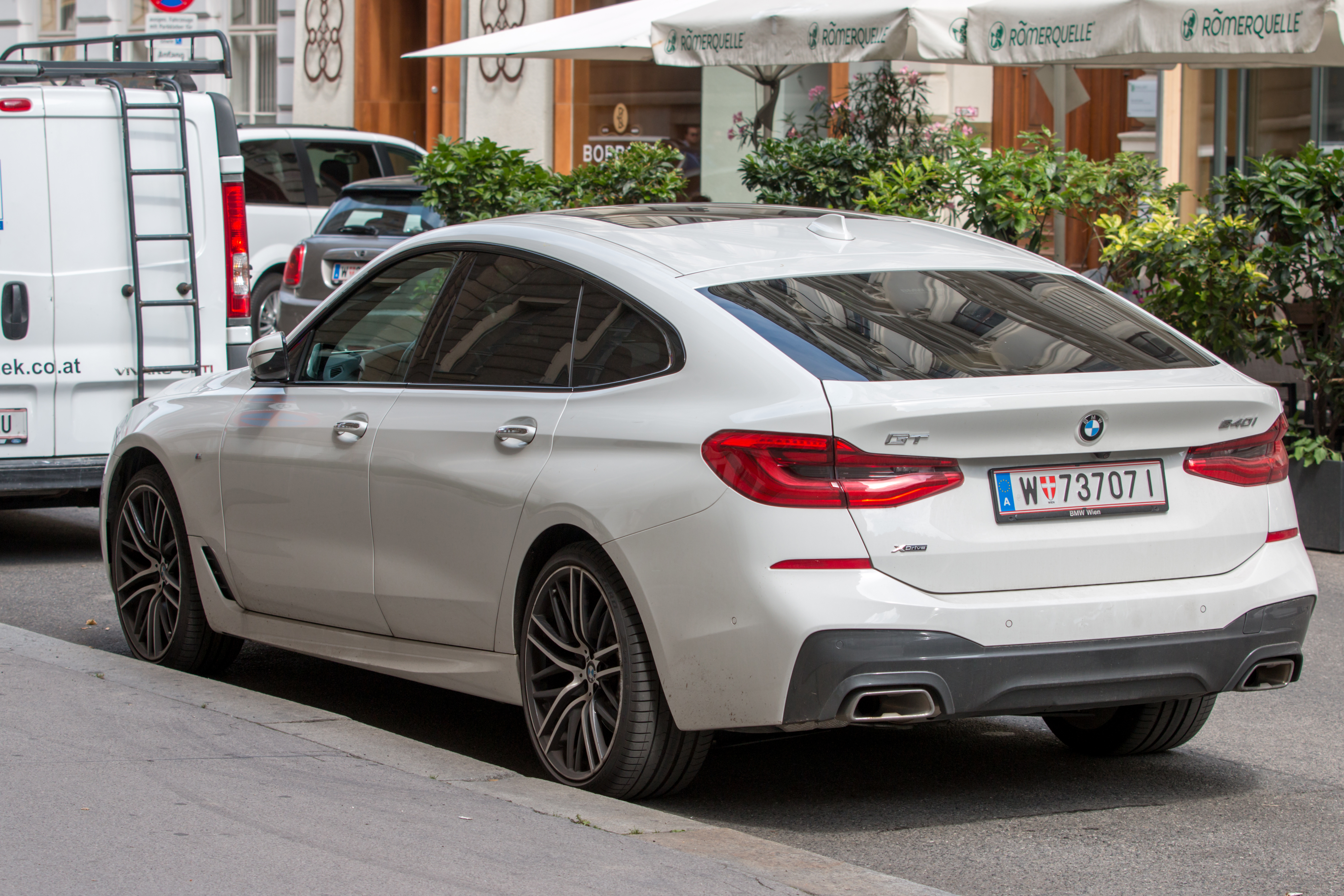
Rear view (640i)

=== Petrol engines ===
Model	Years	Engine	Power	Torque	0–100 km/h (0–62 mph)
630i	2017–2023	B48B20; 2.0 L I4 turbo	190 kW (255 hp) at 5,000–6,500 rpm	400 N⋅m (295 lb⋅ft) at 1,550–4,400 rpm	6.3 s
630i xDrive (Korean Market)	2017–2023	B58B30; 3.0 L I6 turbo	192.3 kW (258 hp) at 5,000 rpm	400 N⋅m (295 lb⋅ft) at 1,550–4,400 rpm	6.4 s
640i	2017–2023	B58B30; 3.0 L I6 turbo	250 kW (335 hp) at 5,500–6,500 rpm	450 N⋅m (332 lb⋅ft) at 1,380–5,200 rpm	5.4 s
640i xDrive	2017–2023	B58B30; 3.0 L I6 turbo	250 kW (335 hp) at 5,500–6,500 rpm	450 N⋅m (332 lb⋅ft) at 1,380–5,200 rpm	5.3 s

=== Diesel engines ===
Model	Years	Engine	Power	Torque	0–100 km/h (0–62 mph)
620d	2018–2023	B47D20; 2.0 L I4 turbo	140 kW (188 hp) at 4,000 rpm	400 N⋅m (295 lb⋅ft) at 1,750–2,500 rpm	7.9 s
630d	2017–2023	B57D30; 3.0 L I6 turbo	195 kW (261 hp) at 4,000 rpm	620 N⋅m (457 lb⋅ft) at 2,000–2,500 rpm	6.1 s
630d xDrive	2017–2023	B57D30; 3.0 L I6 turbo	195 kW (261 hp) at 4,000 rpm	620 N⋅m (457 lb⋅ft) at 2,000–2,500 rpm	6.0 s
640d xDrive	2017–2023	B57D30; 3.0 L I6 turbo	235 kW (315 hp) at 4,400 rpm	680 N⋅m (502 lb⋅ft) at 1,750–2,250 rpm	5.3 s

== Safety ==
ANCAP test results BMW 6 Series GT (2017, aligned with Euro NCAP)
Test	Points	%
Overall:	5 /5 stars	
Adult occupant:	33	86%
Child occupant:	42	85%
Pedestrian:	34.1	81%
Safety assist:	7.1	59%

The 2017 630d GT received five stars overall in its Euro NCAP test.

Euro NCAP test results BMW 630d GT, LHD (2017)
Test	Points	%
Overall:	5 /5 stars	
Adult occupant:	33	86%
Child occupant:	42	85%
Pedestrian:	34.1	81%
Safety assist:	7.1	59%

== Awards ==
- 2017 EuroCar Body Award
