= BMW 5 Series (G30) =

Seventh generation of BMW 5 Series

BMW 5 Series (G30/G31)
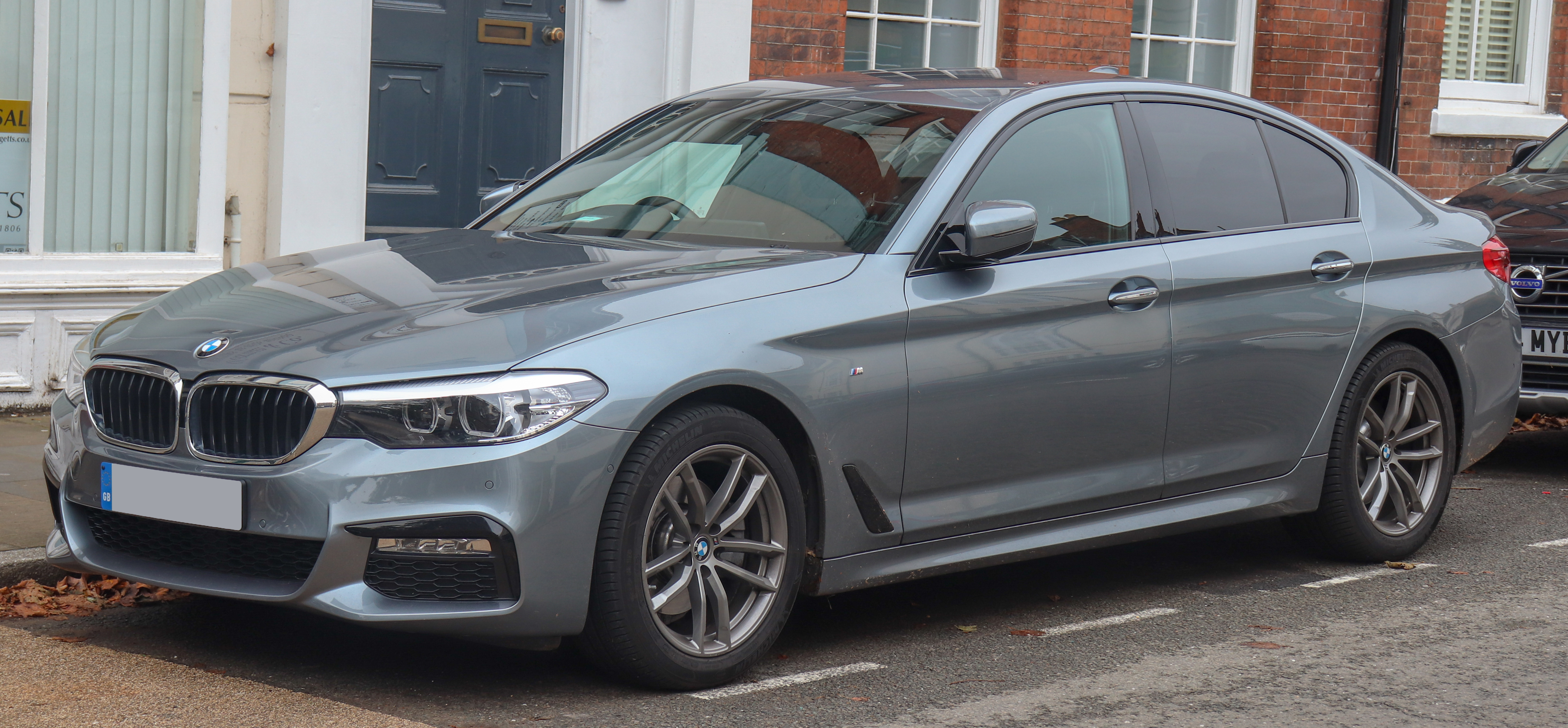

Overview
- Manufacturer: BMW
- Model code: G30 (saloon); G31 (touring)
- Production: November 2016–2023
- Model years: 2017–2023
- Assembly: Germany: Dingolfing (Dingolfing Plant); Austria: Graz (Magna Steyr); China: Tiexi, Shenyang (BBA: LWB); India: Chennai (BMW India); Thailand: Rayong (BMW Thailand); Indonesia: Jakarta (Gaya Motor); Malaysia: Kulim (Inokom); Vietnam: Chu Lai (Truong Hai Group Corporation)
- Designer: Karim Habib (exterior); Daniel Mayerle (interior)

Body and chassis
- Class: Executive car (E)
- Body style: 4-door saloon (G30); 5-door estate (G31); 4-door long-wheelbase (G38)
- Layout: Front-engine, rear-wheel-drive; Front-engine, all-wheel-drive (xDrive)
- Platform: Cluster Architecture (CLAR)
- Related: BMW M5 (F90); BMW 6 Series (G32); BMW 7 Series (G11); BMW 8 Series (G15)

Powertrain
- Engine: Petrol (turbo): 1.6-2.0 L B48 I4; 3.0 L B58 I6; 4.4 L N63/S63 V8; Petrol (turbo PHEV): 2.0 L B48 I4; 3.0 L B58 I6; Diesel (turbo): 2.0 L B47 I4; 3.0 L B57 I6
- Transmission: 6-speed manual; 8-speed automatic
- Hybrid drivetrain: Mild hybrid; Plug-in hybrid

Dimensions
- Wheelbase: 2,975 mm (117.1 in); 3,105 mm (122.2 in) LWB
- Length: 4,936–4,963 mm (194.3–195.4 in); 5,092 mm (200.5 in) LWB
- Width: 1,858–1,868 mm (73.1–73.5 in)
- Height: 1,479–1,498 mm (58.2–59.0 in)
- Kerb weight: 1,605–2,035 kg (3,538–4,486 lb)

Chronology
- Predecessor: BMW 5 Series (F10)
- Successor: BMW 5 Series (G60)

The seventh generation of the BMW 5 Series consists of the BMW G30 (saloon version) and BMW G31 (estate version, marketed as 'Touring') executive cars. The G30/G31 has been produced since 2016 by the German automaker BMW and is often collectively referred to as the G30. It was officially announced on 12 October 2016 and sales began in February 2017.

The fastback 5 Series Gran Turismo model from the previous generation is no longer part of the 5 Series model range, and has been moved to the 6 Series Gran Turismo nameplate. A long-wheelbase sedan version (model code G38) is sold in China.

On 27 May 2020, a facelifted 5 Series was unveiled. In 2023, the G30 5 Series was replaced by the G60 5 Series. In 2024, the G31 Touring was replaced by the G61.

== Development and launch ==
The BMW Head of Design during the development of the G30 was Karim Habib. Interior design was led by Daniel Mayerle.

The 5 Series saloon was unveiled on 12 October 2016 before making its public debut in January 2017 at the North American International Auto Show (NAIAS) in Detroit.

BMW created The Escape, a short action film featuring a 540i M Sport, to promote the G30 5 Series. The Escape was released online on 23 October 2016.

The 5 Series Touring was unveiled in February 2017 before making its public debut in March at the Geneva Motor Show.

The 5 Series long-wheelbase model debuted in April 2017 at the Shanghai Motor Show. Its wheelbase is 130 millimetres (5.1 in) longer than that of the normal 5 Series saloon and is exclusively sold in China.

== Body styles ==
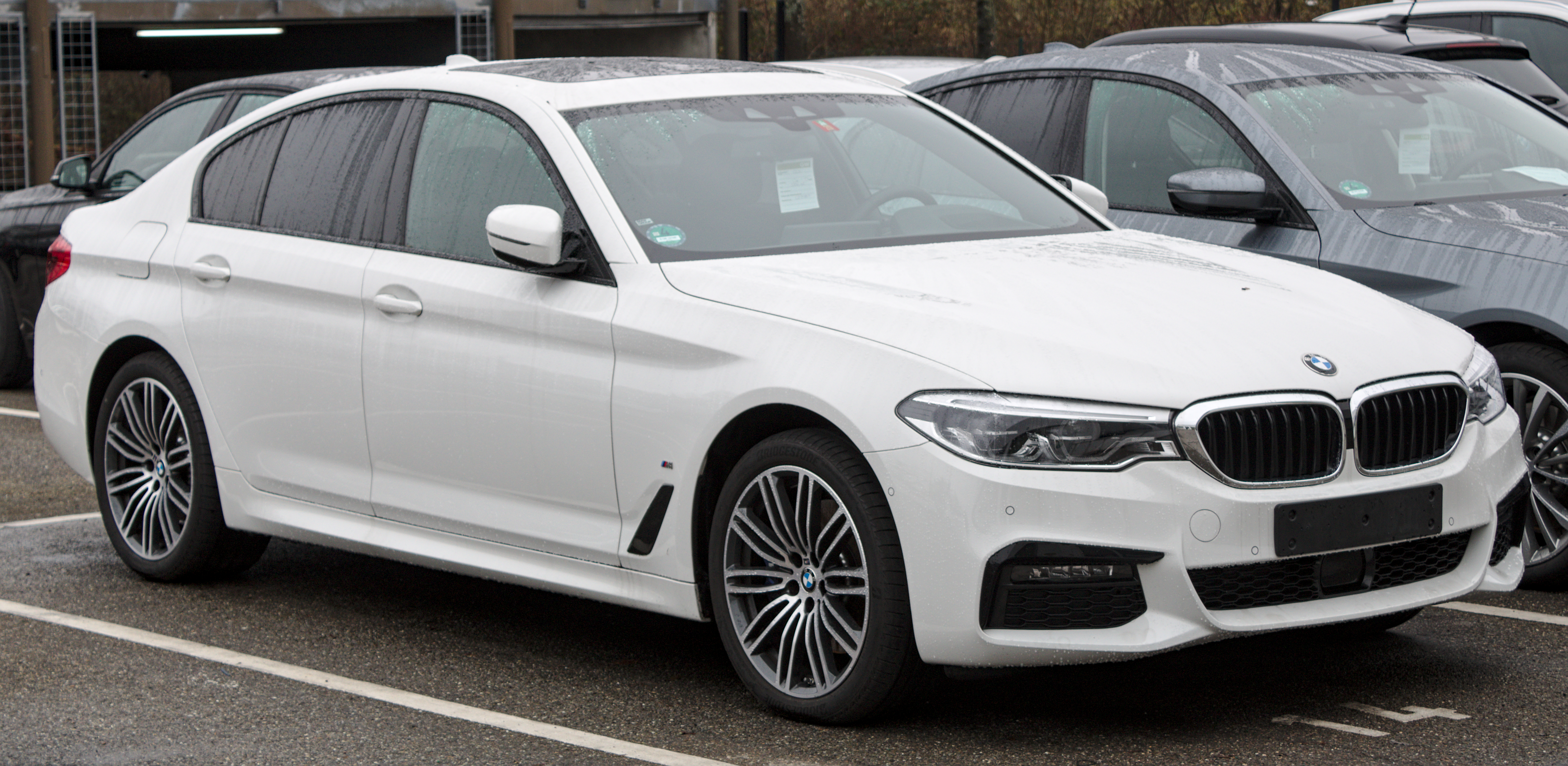
G30 sedan (M Sport)

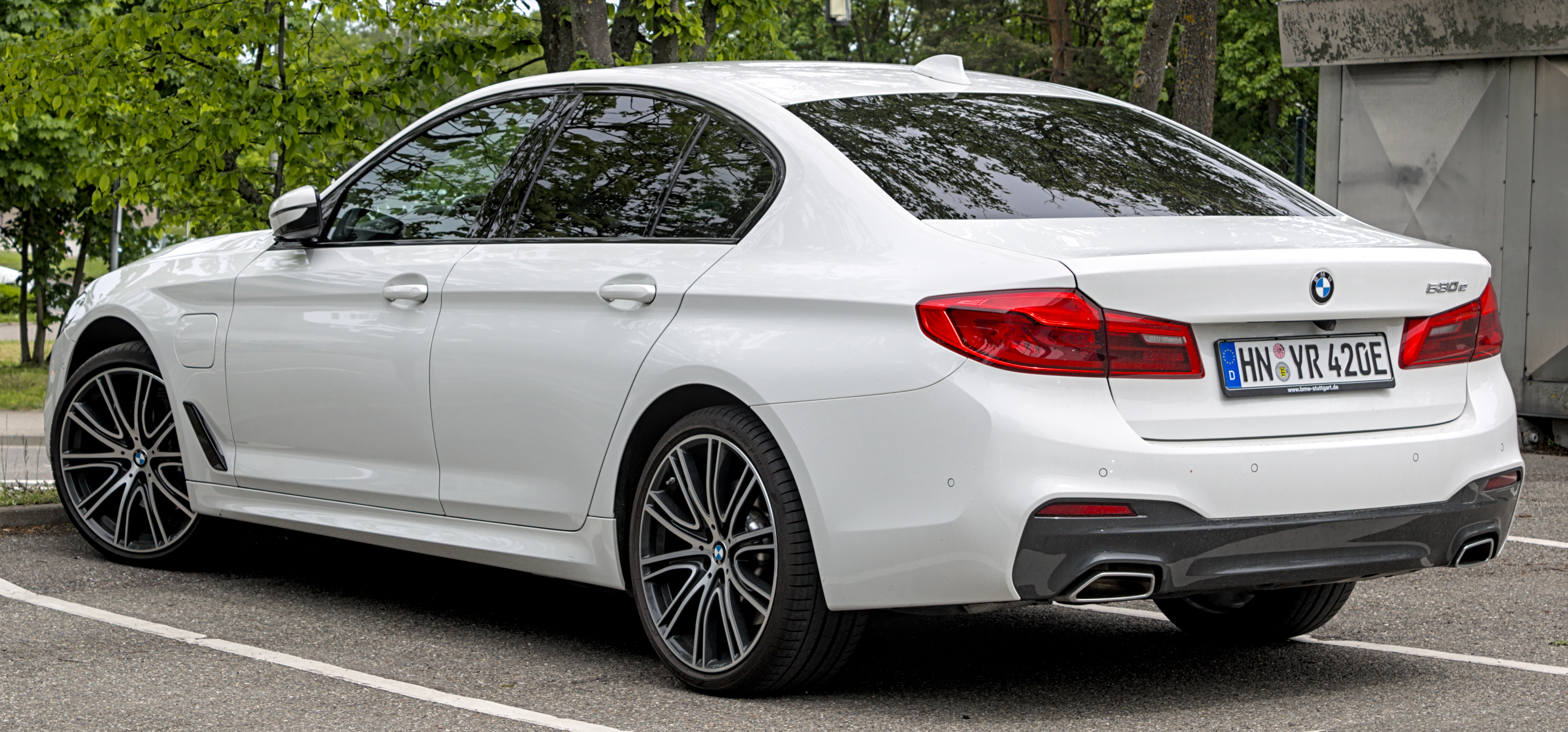
G30 sedan (M Sport)

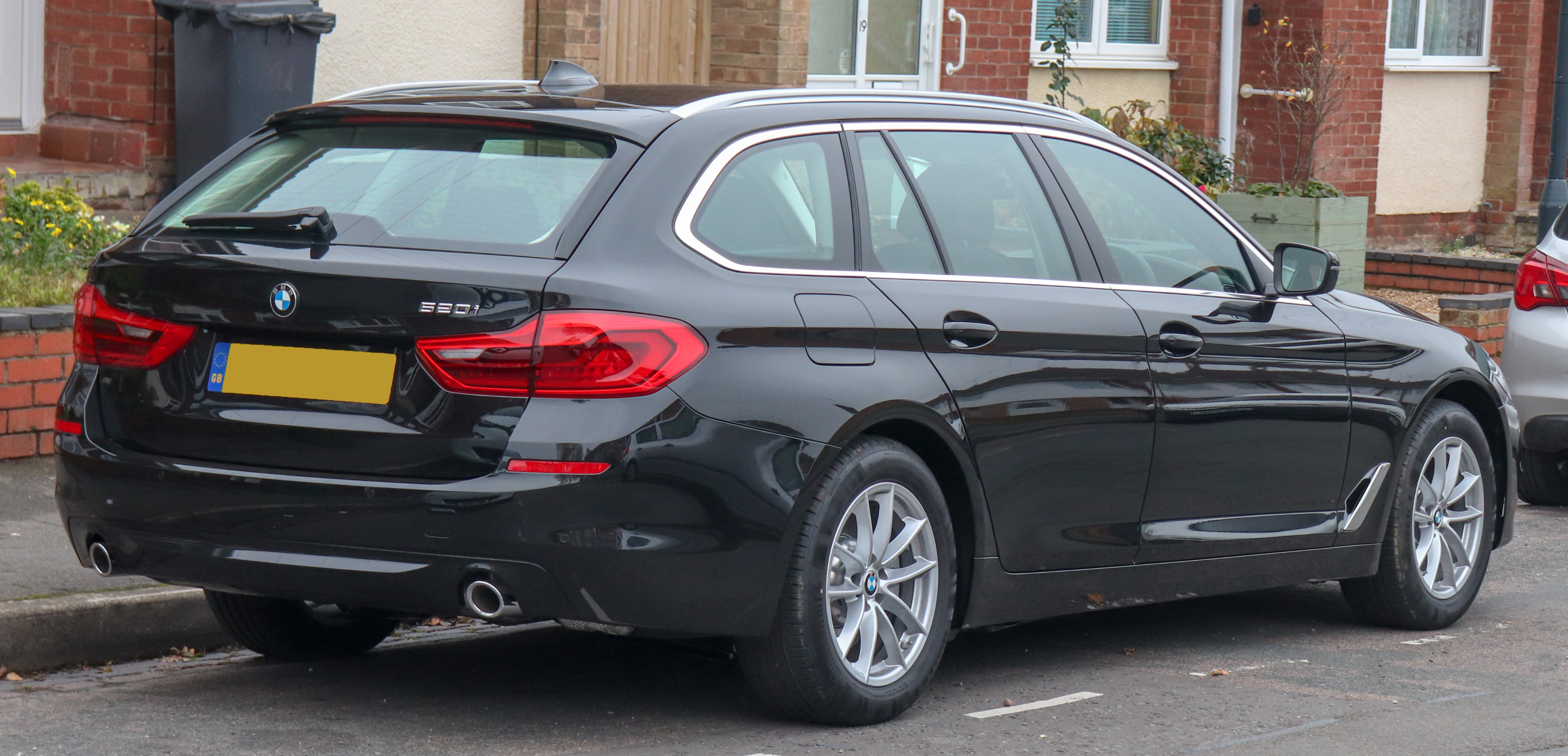
G31 wagon

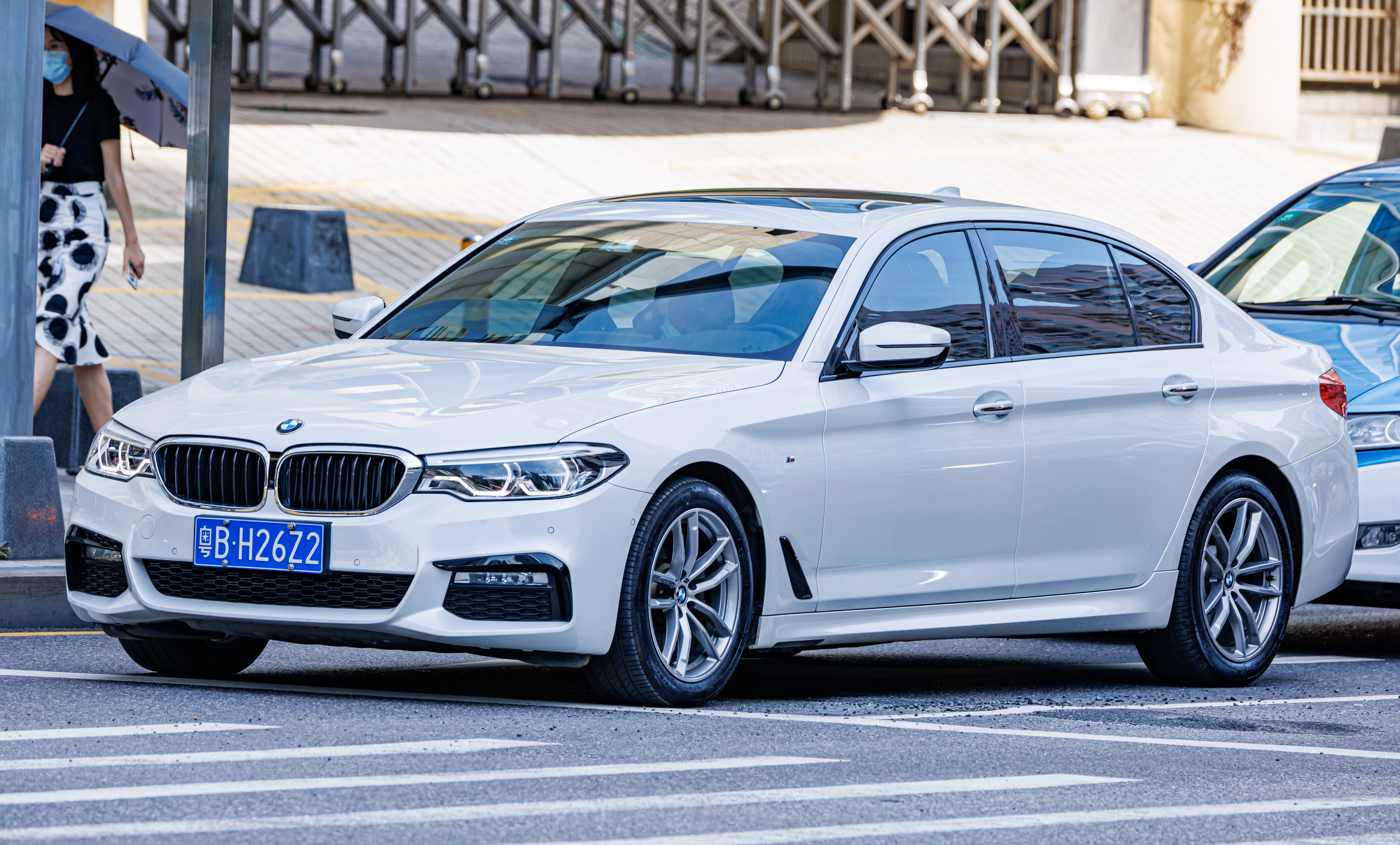
G38 long-wheelbase sedan (China)

== Specifications ==
=== Platform ===
The G30 5 Series utilises BMW's modular Cluster Architecture (CLAR) platform first introduced in the 7 Series (G11). The 5 Series' chassis is made from a mixture of different grades of steel and aluminium. The kerb weight ranges from 1,605–1,989 kg (3,538–4,385 lb), depending on specification.

Much of the 5 Series' body panels are constructed of aluminium, including the bonnet, boot lid, roof and doors.

=== Suspension and steering ===
The 5 Series uses double-wishbone front suspension and 5-link rear suspension while Touring models feature self-levelling rear air suspension. Active anti-roll bars (named "Dynamic Drive") are optional equipment.

All versions of the 5 Series use rack and pinion steering with electric power assistance. "Integral Active Steering" is an option on some models; and combines electromechanical four-wheel steering and a variable-ratio steering rack.

=== Powertrain ===
The 5 Series is offered with a range of turbocharged petrol and diesel engines. It is also offered as a mild hybrid and a plug-in hybrid.

Up until 2018, 520d models were fitted as standard with a 6-speed manual transmission, while the ZF 8HP 8-speed automatic transmission is optional. All other models, including the 520d xDrive, are exclusively available with the ZF automatic transmission.

BMW's xDrive all-wheel drive system is optional on some base models and is standard fitment on top-of-the-line models.

== Equipment ==
Compared with its F10 predecessor, the G30 includes an updated BMW iDrive system with a higher resolution 10.25-inch display, a new heads-up display that covers 70% more area as well as selective anti-dazzle high beam headlights with a range of up to 500 metres. The 5 Series is also available with gesture control, new multi-contour massage seats, and a Driving Assistant Plus package that features lane departure warning, adaptive cruise control, a lane centralizing and vehicle following system and a collision warning system. 518-545 models with the M Sport trim and M550 models can be fitted with M Performance Parts. These include a splitter, side skirts, rims, carbon fibre mirrors and a carbon fibre spoiler.

At launch, the G30 is available in two equipment lines: Luxury Line and Sport Line, with the M Sport models becoming available in March 2017. The main differences of these lines are colour availability (for example, the M Sport models have Carbon Black metallic instead of Jet Black), wheel designs, as well as exterior and interior stylings. The Sport Line has been discontinued during the 2021 facelift.

Laser Headlights (pre-LCI M550i, M550d, M5 and all LCI models)

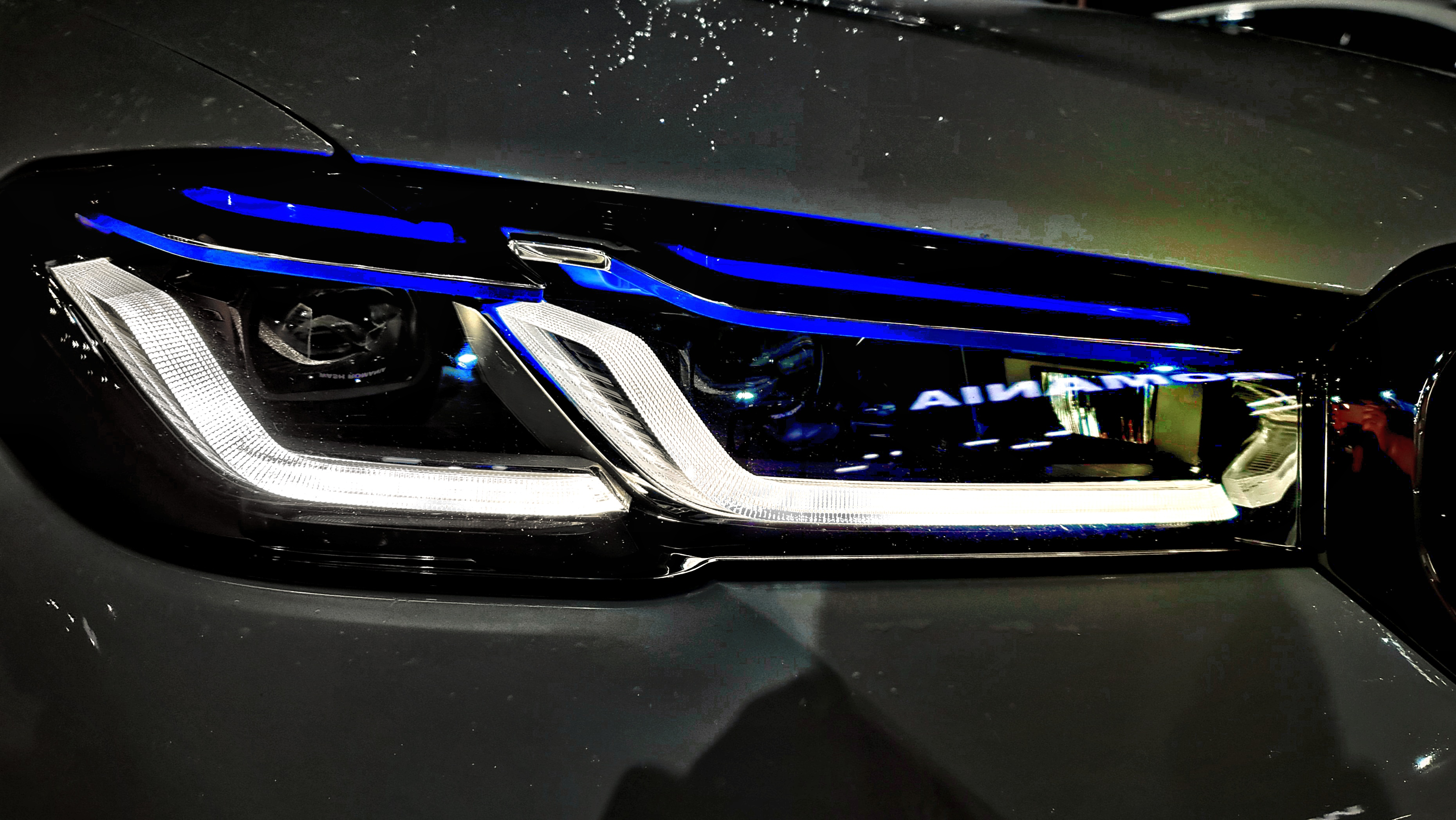
BMW G30 LCI Laser Headlights

BMW laserlight headlights are high-beam technology that not only delivers a brighter beam but adapts to the environment. Laser headlights function by using three small blue lasers pointed at a set of mirrors in the front of the headlight system. The mirrors focus the laser light into a lens filled with yellow phosphorus. Yellow phosphorus when excited by the blue laser emits an intense white light.

Luxury Line

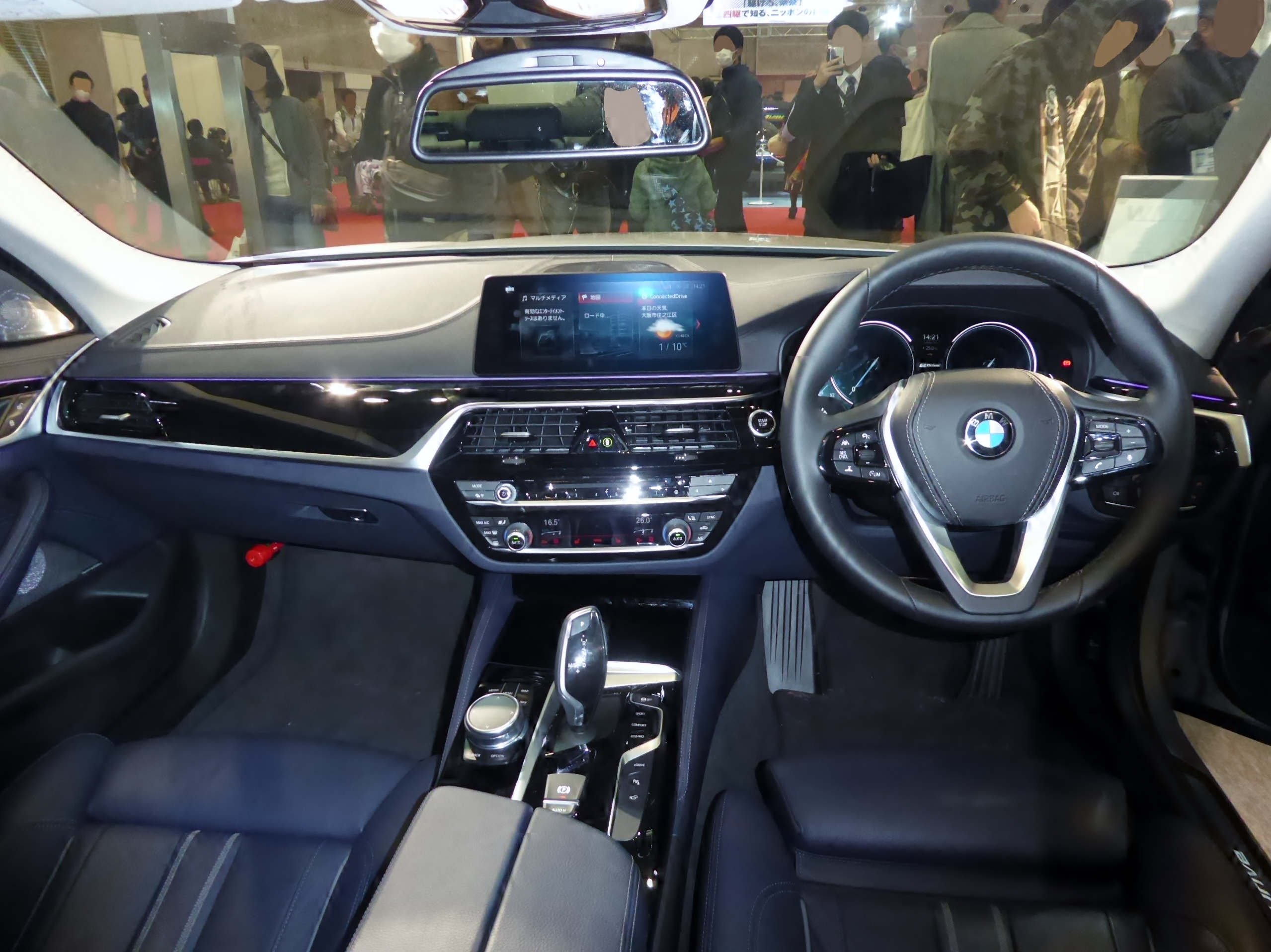
Luxury Line interior

In the Luxury Line, the car carries a classic luxury look with high-gloss chrome finish on exterior elements like the Air Breather vent, the radiator grille, the lower air intakes and the side windows surrounds. Inside, leather upholstery is standard, while the instrument panel is trimmed in Sensatec leatherette as standard. The dashboard as well as the door cards are trimmed in "Ridge" fine-wood finish as standard with other wood finishes available as an option. Standard wheels are 18-inch W-spoke or 19-inch multi-spoke wheels.

Sport Line

In the Sport Line, the sporty character of the car is emphasized with high-gloss black finish on the Air Breather vent, the radiator grille slats, the lower air intake and side windows surrounds. Inside, combination cloth/leather upholstery is standard, with leather available as an option. The dashboard and door cards are trimmed in high-gloss Black with Pearl Chrome accents with other trims available as an option. Standard wheels are 18-inch 10 double-spoke or 19-inch V-spoke wheels. This line was discontinued after the June 2020 facelift for model year 2021.

M Sport Package

The M Sport Package has been available for order since March 2017. In addition to the standard colour palette (with the exception of Jet Black and Glacier Silver), the M Sport Package includes an exclusive colour option: Carbon Black metallic. The front and rear apron styling are unique to the M Sport models, while the suspension is lowered compared the standard setup. Optionally available for the M Sport Package is the M Sport brakes with blue-painted calipers. On the interior, front sport seats in combination cloth/Alcantara is fitted as standard, with leather and comfort front seats available as optional equipment. Another unique feature to the M Sport models is the M Sport multifunction leather steering wheel. Standard wheels include 18-inch 5 double-spoke wheels or 19-inch 10 double-spoke wheels.

== Engines ==
=== Petrol ===
Model	Years	Engine	Power	Torque	Top speed	0–100 km/h (0–62 mph)
520i (Note: Sold as the 523i in Japan)	2018–2024	1.6 L B48 I4 turbo	125 kW (170 PS) at 5,000–6,500 rpm	250 N⋅m (184 lb⋅ft) at 2,000–4,700 rpm	224 km/h (139 mph)	8.7 s
520i	2017–2024	2.0 L B48 I4 turbo	135 kW (184 PS) at 5,000–6,500 rpm	290 N⋅m (214 lb⋅ft) at 1,350–4,250 rpm	235 km/h (146 mph)	7.8 s
520e iPerformance	2021–2024	2.0 L B48 I4 turbo with electric motor	150 kW (204 PS) at 5,000–6,500 rpm	350 N⋅m (258 lb⋅ft) at 1,450–3,700 rpm	218 km/h (135 mph)	8.2 s
530i	2017–2024	2.0 L B48 I4 turbo	185 kW (252 PS) at 5,200–6,500 rpm	350 N⋅m (258 lb⋅ft) at 1,450–4,800 rpm	250 km/h (155 mph)	6.2 s
530e iPerformance	2017–2024	2.0 L B48 I4 turbo with electric motor	185 kW (252 PS) at 5,000–6,500 rpm	420 N⋅m (310 lb⋅ft) at 1,450–3,700 rpm	235 km/h (146 mph)	6.2 s
530e LCI iPerformance	2017–2024	2.0 L B48 I4 turbo with electric motor	218 kW (296 PS) at 5,000–6,500 rpm	420 N⋅m (310 lb⋅ft) at 1,450–3,700 rpm	235 km/h (146 mph)	5.8 s
540i	2017–2024	3.0 L B58 I6 turbo	250 kW (340 PS) at 5,500–6,500 rpm	450 N⋅m (332 lb⋅ft) at 1,380–5,200 rpm	250 km/h (155 mph)	5.1 s
540i xDrive	2017–2024	3.0 L B58 I6 turbo	250 kW (340 PS) at 5,500–6,500 rpm	450 N⋅m (332 lb⋅ft) at 1,380–5,200 rpm	250 km/h (155 mph)	4.8 s
545e xDrive	2021–2024	3.0 L B58 I6 turbo with electric motor	290 kW (394 PS) at 5,500 rpm	600 N⋅m (443 lb⋅ft) at 1,500–5,200 rpm	250 km/h (155 mph)	4.6 s
M550i xDrive	2018–2020	4.4 L N63 V8 twin-turbo	340 kW (462 PS) at 5,500–6,000 rpm	650 N⋅m (479 lb⋅ft) at 1,800–4,750 rpm	250 km/h (155 mph)	3.8 s
M550i xDrive	2020–2024	4.4 L N63 V8 twin-turbo	390 kW (530 PS) at 5,500–6,000 rpm	750 N⋅m (553 lb⋅ft) at 1,800–4,750 rpm	250 km/h (155 mph)	3.6 s
M5/M5 Competition	2018–2024; 2019–2024 (Competition)	4.4 L S63 V8 twin-turbo	441 kW (600 PS) at 6000 rpm 460 kW (625 PS) at 5,500–6,000 rpm	750 N⋅m (553 lb⋅ft) at 1,850–5,960 rpm	250 / 306 km/h (155 / 190 mph)	3.1 s
Alpina B5	2018–2024	4.4 L N63 V8 twin-turbo	447 kW (608 PS)	800 N⋅m (590 lb⋅ft)	330 km/h (205 mph)	3.5 s

=== Diesel ===
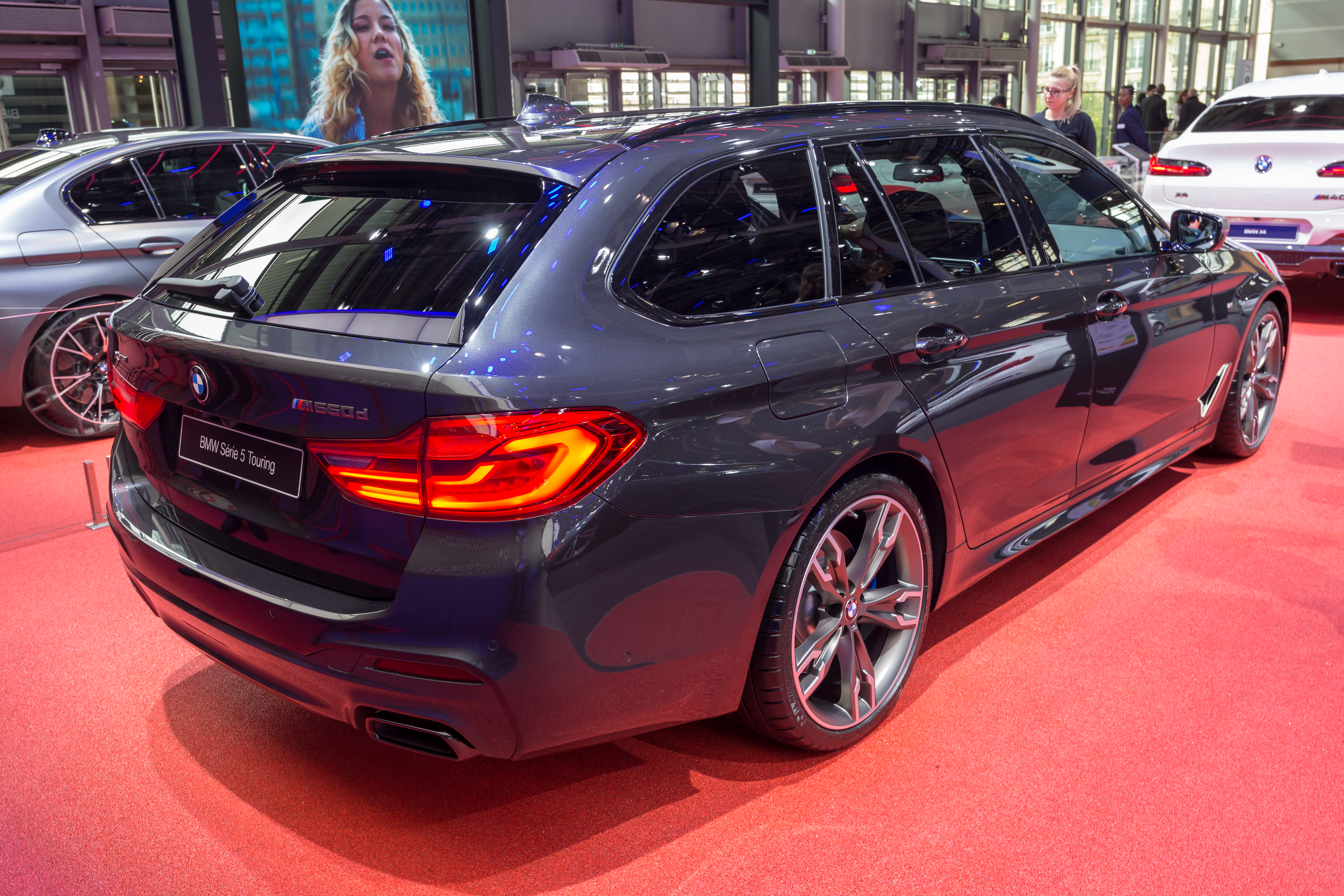
M550d touring

Model	Years	Engine	Power	Torque	0–100 km/h (0–62 mph)
518d	2017–2020	2.0 L B47 I4 turbo	110 kW (150 PS) at 4,000 rpm	350 N⋅m (258 lb⋅ft) at 1,750–2,250 rpm	10 s
520d / 523d	2017–2023	2.0 L B47 I4 turbo	140 kW (190 PS) at 4,000 rpm	400 N⋅m (295 lb⋅ft) at 1,750–2,500 rpm	7.3 s
525d	2017–2020	2.0 L B47 I4 turbo	170 kW (231 PS) at 4,400 rpm	500 N⋅m (369 lb⋅ft) at 2,000 rpm	6.6 s
530d	2017–2020	3.0 L B57 I6 turbo	195 kW (265 PS) at 4,000 rpm	620 N⋅m (457 lb⋅ft) at 2,000–2,500 rpm	5.8 s
530d	2020-2023	3.0 L B57 I6 turbo	210 kW (282 hp) at 4,000 rpm	650 N⋅m (479 lb⋅ft) at 1500 rpm	5.4 s
540d xDrive (Note: North American version uses the 195 kW variant from the European-specification 530d model)	2017–2020	3.0 L B57 I6 twin-turbo	235 kW (320 PS) at 4,400 rpm	680 N⋅m (502 lb⋅ft) at 1,750–2,250 rpm	4.9 s
540d xDrive	2020–2023	3.0 L B57 I6 twin-turbo	250 kW (335 hp) at 4,400 rpm	700 N⋅m (516 lb⋅ft) at 1750 rpm	4.7 s
M550d xDrive	2017–2020	3.0 L B57 I6 quad-turbo	294 kW (400 PS) at 4,400 rpm	760 N⋅m (561 lb⋅ft) at 2,000–3,000 rpm	4.4 s
Alpina D5 S	2017–2024	3.0 L B57 I6 tri-turbo	282 kW (383 PS; 378 hp)	800 N⋅m (590 lb⋅ft)	4.4 s (saloon) 4.6 s (touring)
Alpina D5 S	2017–2024	3.0 L B57 I6 twin-turbo	240 kW (326 PS; 322 hp)	700 N⋅m (516 lb⋅ft)	4.9 s

== Special models ==
=== 530e iPerformance ===
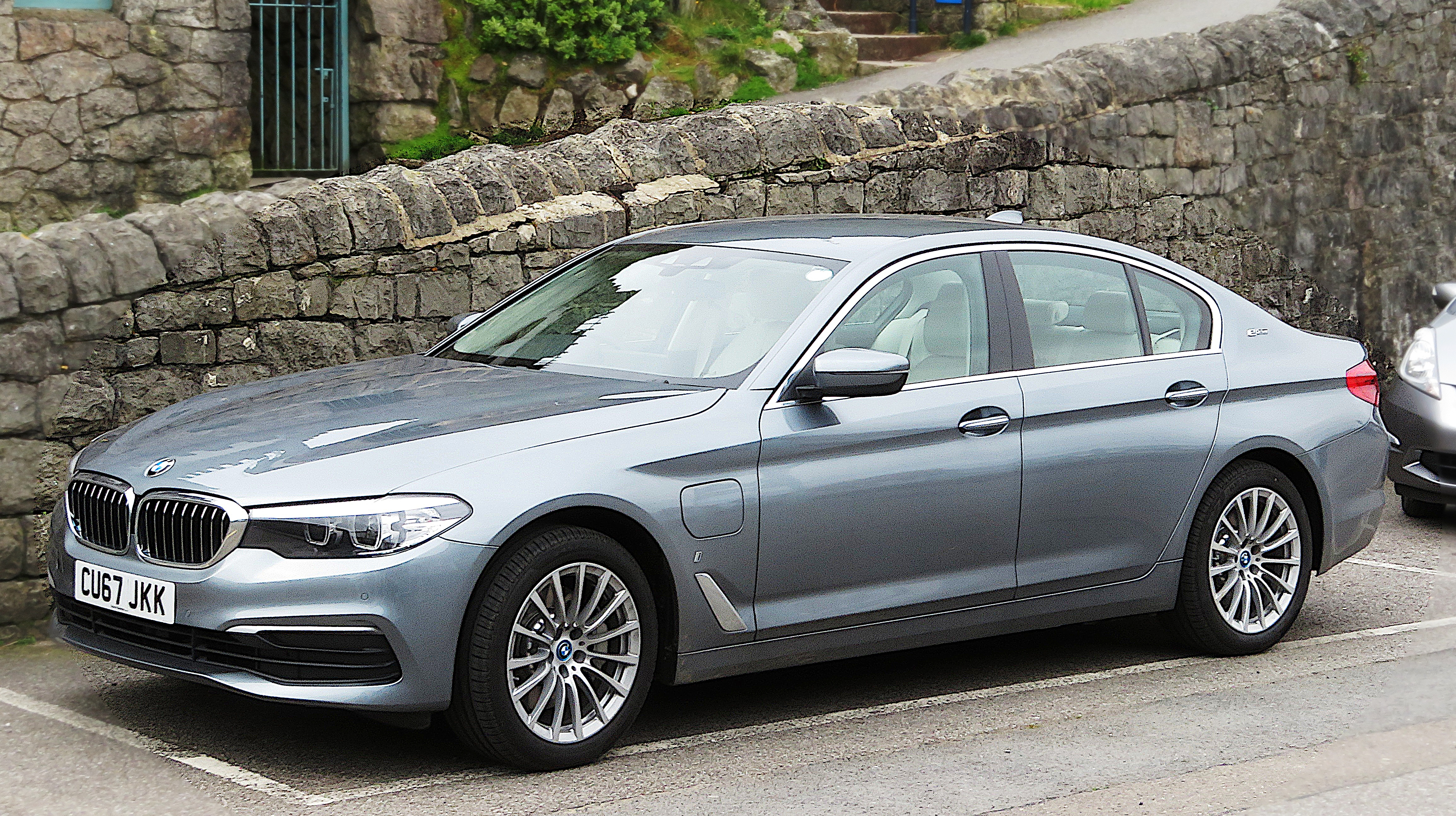
BMW 530e iPerformance

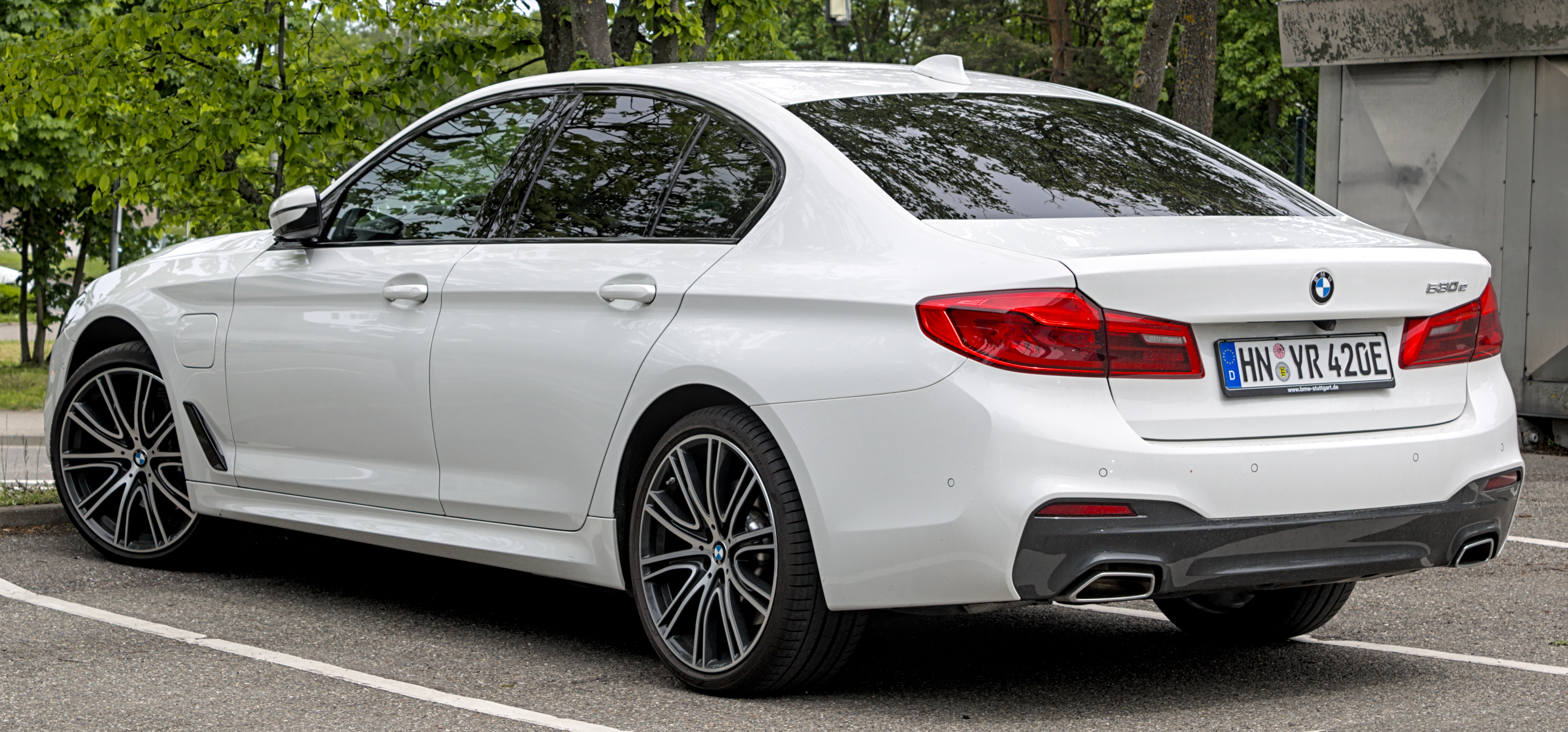
530e rear

The 530e iPerformance is a plug-in hybrid variant of the 5 Series sedan. It uses a 135 kW (181 hp) turbocharged 2.0-litre inline-four engine, in conjunction with an 83 kW (111 hp) electric motor, to return a combined output of 185 kW (248 hp) and 420 N⋅m (310 lb⋅ft) or 218 kW (292 hp) and 420 N⋅m (310 lb⋅ft) for the LCI model. At launch, the 530e had a claimed all-electric range of 50 km (31 mi) under the New European Driving Cycle. The US EPA estimated all-electric range was 16 miles (26 km). The electric motor was powered by a 9.2 kWh lithium-ion battery beneath the rear seats.

With the 530e, BMW also began an experimental wireless charging program. Testing was originally limited to Germany, but expanded other markets such as California. The system uses a 3.2 kW wireless charging pad that the car could drive over to charge the lithium-ion battery pack.

For the 2020 model year, BMW increased the lithium-ion battery capacity by about 30% to 12.0 kWh with 10.8 kWh usable. With the increase in battery size, the EPA estimated all-electric range increased to 21 miles for the rear-wheel drive version and 19 miles for the xDrive version.

The 530e iPerformance is offered in both rear-wheel drive and all-wheel drive (xDrive) variants. Preordered 530e LCI models come without the hybrid blue inserts for the BMW logos and edrive badges on the sides, making them a rare spec.

=== 545e xDrive ===
In December 2020, for the 2021 model year, BMW released the 545e xDrive, a more powerful plug-in variant. As opposed to the turbocharged inline-four engine in the 530e, the 545e xDrive uses a more powerful turbocharged inline-six engine paired with an electric motor. Total power output is 290 kW / 394 hp and it accelerates from 0 to 100 km/h in 4.6 seconds. Like the 530e, it uses a 12.0 kWh lithium-ion battery pack. Preordered 545e models come without the hybrid blue inserts for the BMW logos and edrive badges on the sides, making them a rare spec.

A special edition of the 545e xDrive was released to celebrate the launch of the G30 LCI. It was called "M Sport Edition" and was limited to 1000 units globally. It introduced Tanzanite Blue to the model and featured exclusive wheels (1001M) and M Sport Seats as standard on top of the regular M Sport Package.

=== Alpina ===
==== B5 Bi-Turbo ====
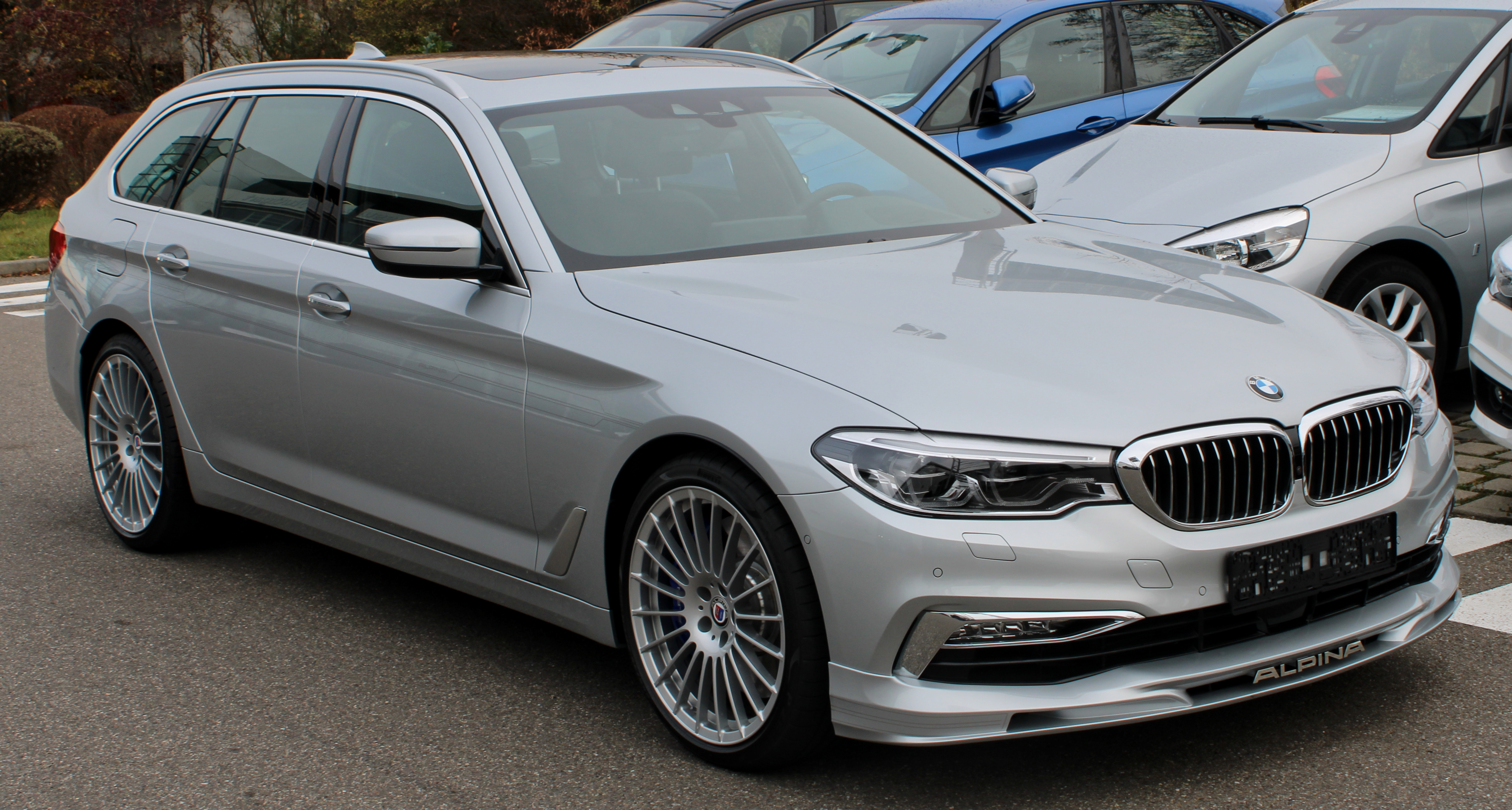
Alpina B5 Bi-Turbo Touring

The Alpina B5 was introduced at the 2017 Geneva Motor Show in all-wheel drive only Saloon and Touring variants. The B5 features a 4.4-litre N63M30 V8 engine that generates a maximum power output of 447 kW (599 hp) and 800 N⋅m (590 lb⋅ft) of torque. Based on the N63B44O2 V8, it has uprated pistons, new twin-scroll Garrett turbochargers and new spark plugs by NGK. The B5 can accelerate from 0–100 km/h (0–62 mph) 3.5 seconds with a top speed of 330 km/h (205 mph), making it the fastest estate car currently in production.

==== D5 S ====
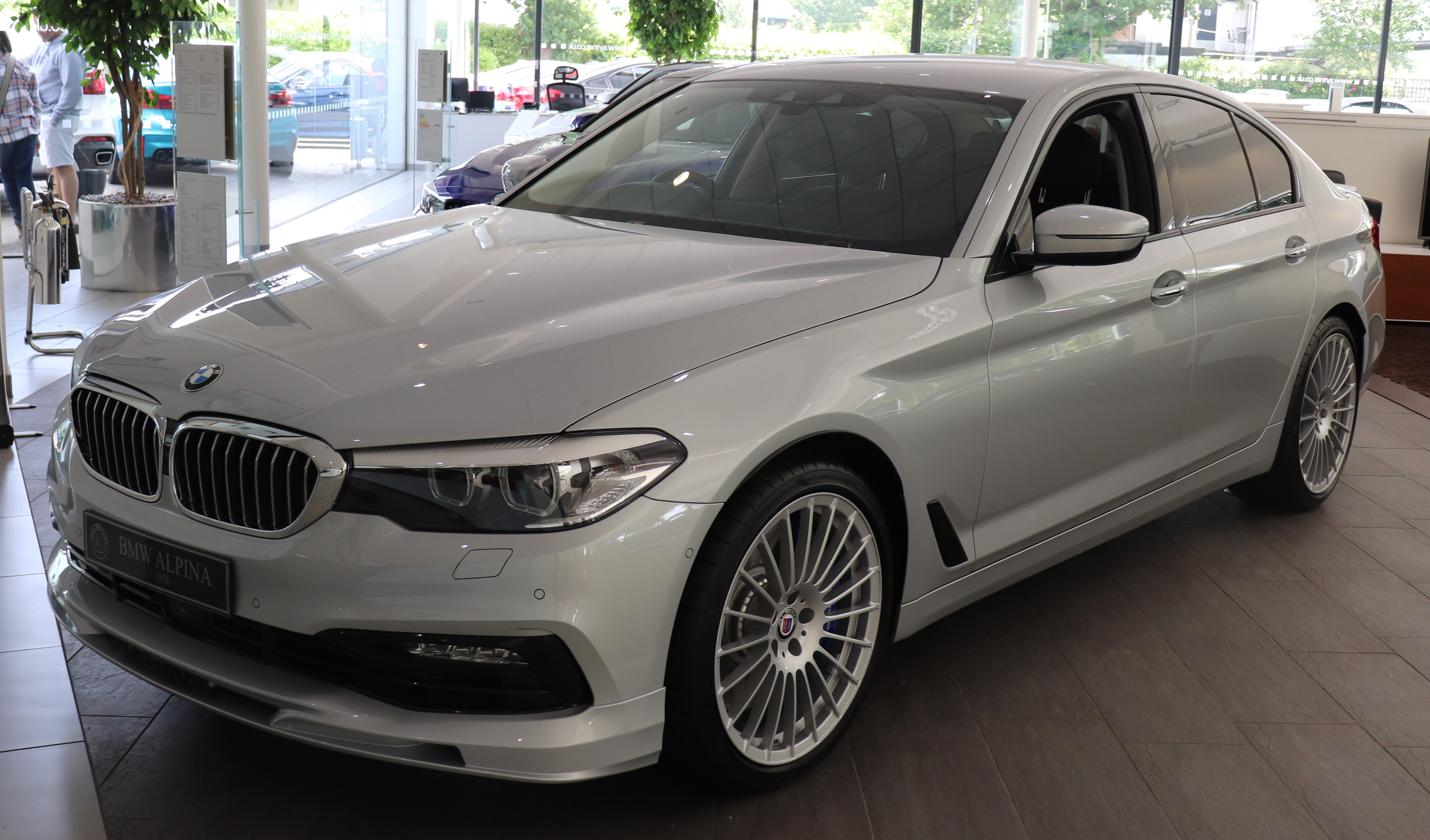
Alpina D5 S

The Alpina D5 S debuted at the 2017 Frankfurt Motor Show in all-wheel drive only sedan and Touring variants. The D5 S uses a modified 3.0-litre B57D30 diesel inline-six engine. The engine has three turbochargers and is rated at 285 kW (382 hp) and 800 N⋅m (590 lb⋅ft) of torque in left-hand drive markets, whereas it has two turbochargers and is rated at 240 kW (322 hp) and 700 N⋅m (516 lb⋅ft) of torque in right-hand drive markets. The left-hand drive D5 S saloon has a top speed of 286 km/h (178 mph) and a 0–100 km/h (62 mph) acceleration time of 4.4 seconds. Alpina claims it is the fastest diesel-powered production car in the world. The right-hand drive, saloon-only version has a 0–100 km/h (62 mph) acceleration time of 4.9 seconds and a top speed of 275 km/h (171 mph).

=== M5 ===
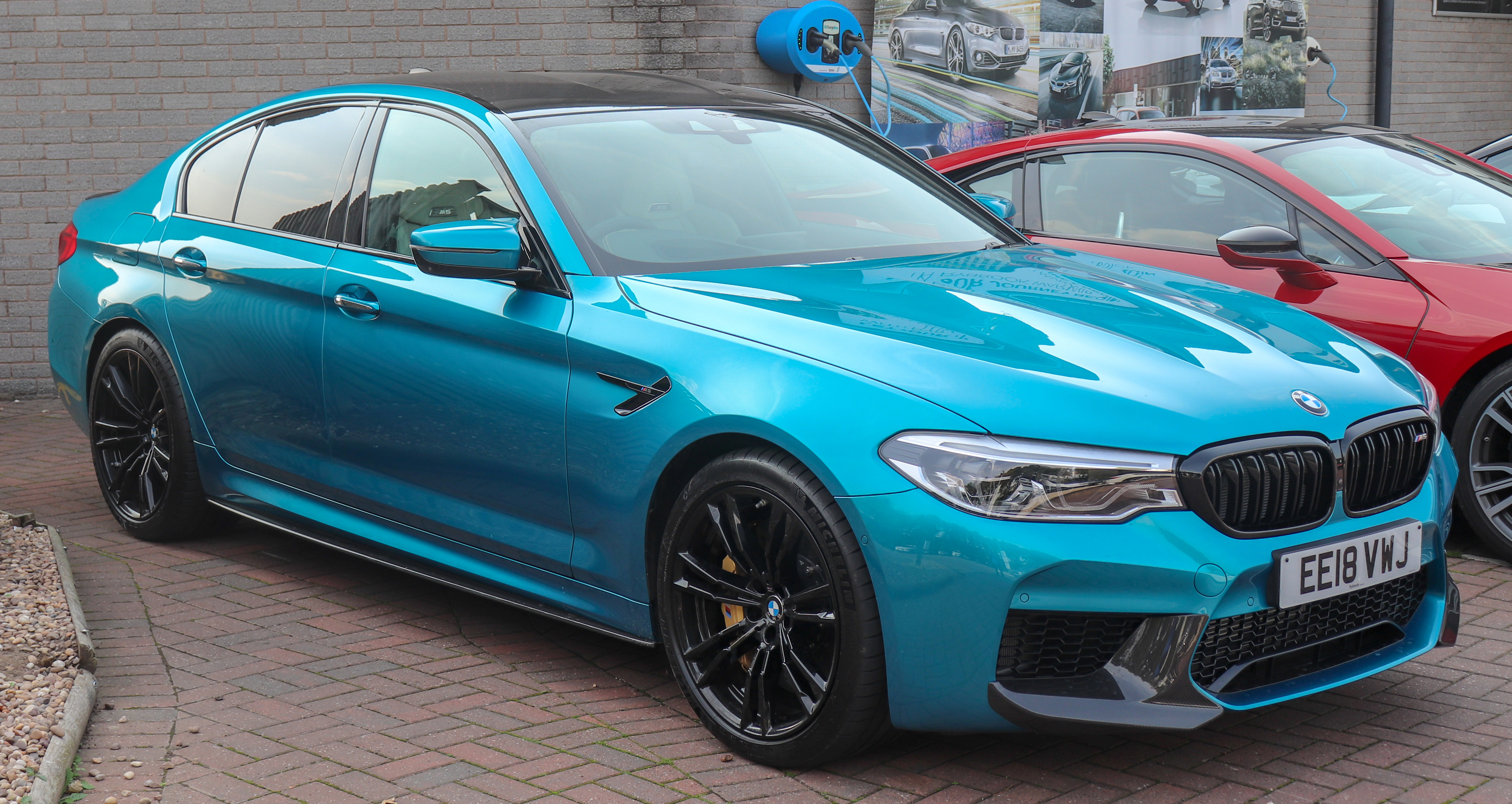
M5

The M5, based on the 5 Series (known internally as F90) was announced on 21 August 2017 alongside the Need for Speed Payback video game followed by a public reveal at the Frankfurt Motor Show in September 2017. The car utilizes a 4.4-litre V8 engine rated at 441 kW (591 hp) and 750 N⋅m (553 lb⋅ft) of torque, and is the first M5 to feature an automatic gearbox as the sole transmission option, and an all-wheel drive system that can switch between rear-wheel drive or all-wheel drive mode. The M5 was initially offered in a "First Edition" trim that adds a numbered plaque, 20-inch wheels, matte red paint and white leather upholstery. A competition package for the M5 was announced on 9 May 2018. Deliveries of the M5 Competition began in September 2018.

== Facelift ==
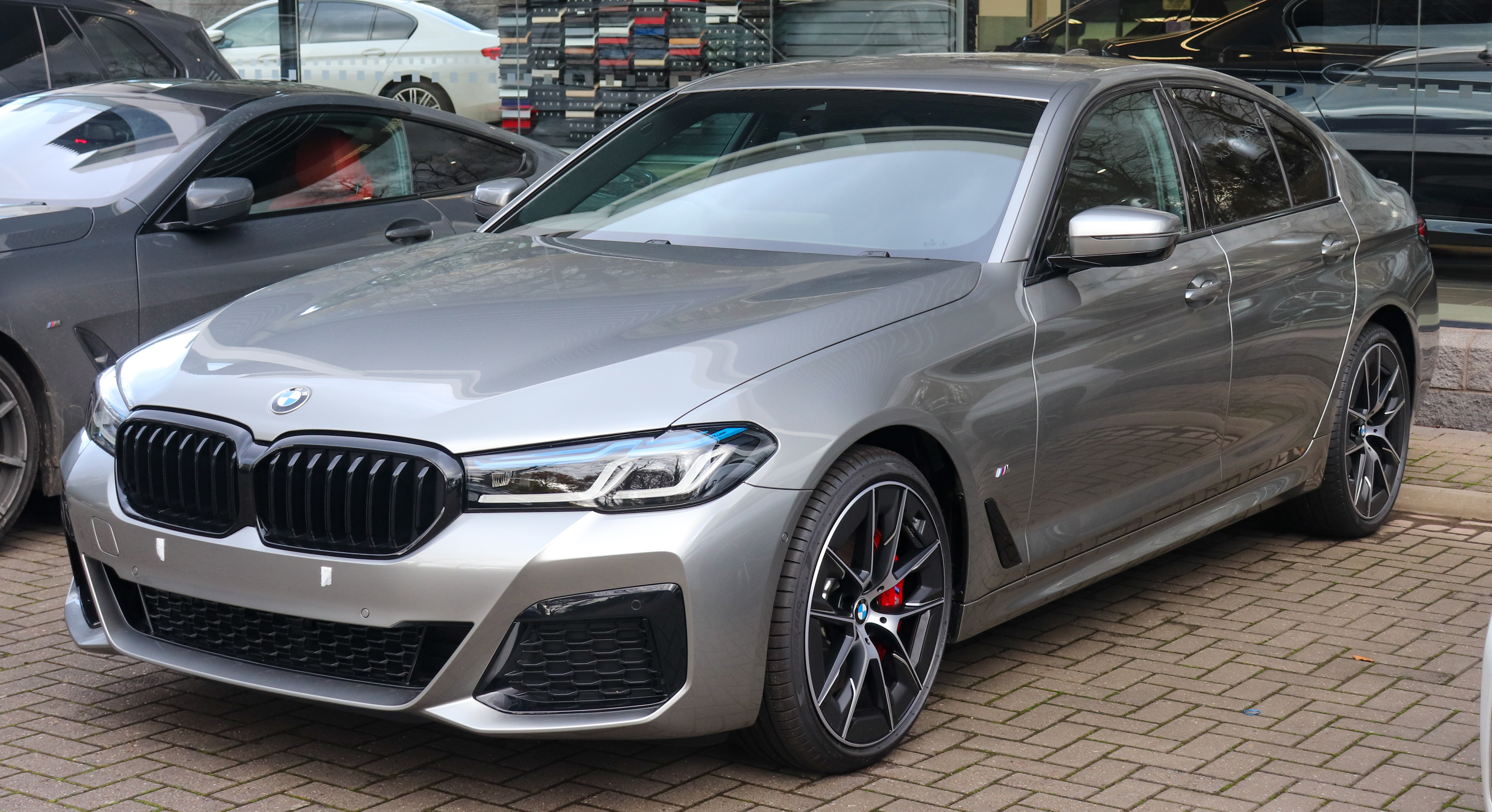
BMW 530d Sedan (post-facelift)

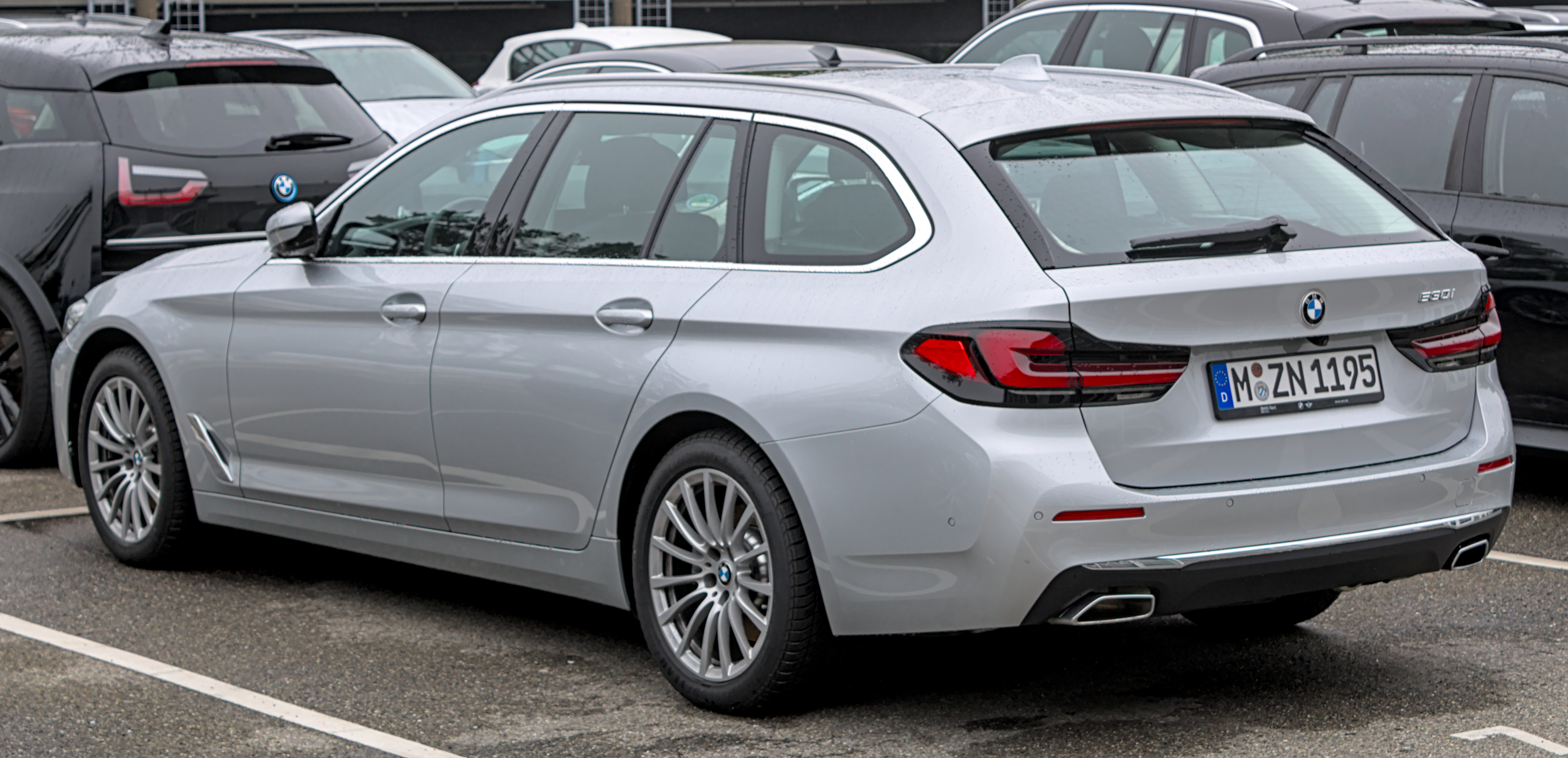
BMW 530i Touring (post-facelift)

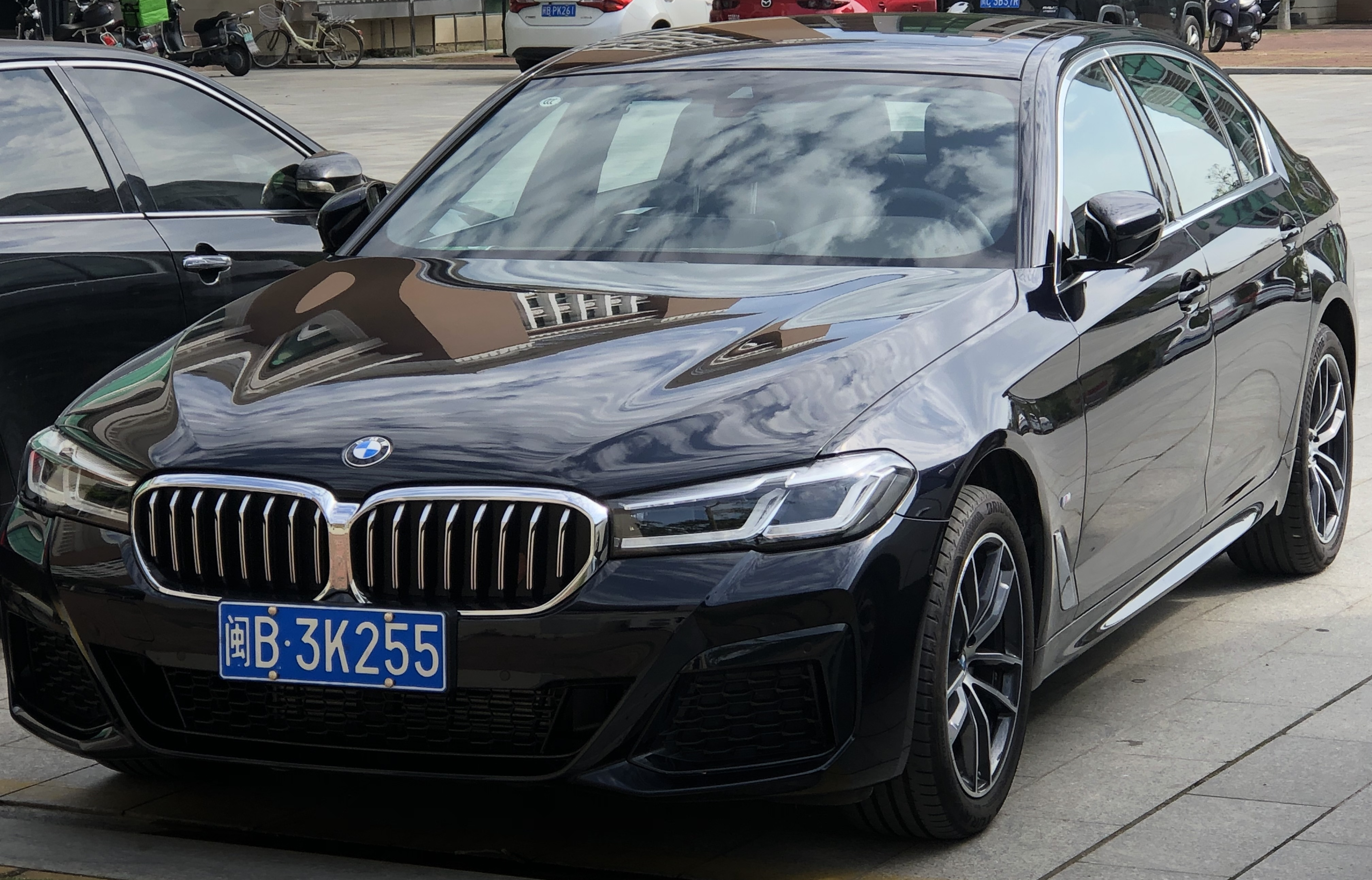
G38 long-wheelbase sedan (post-facelift)

The G30 5 Series underwent a facelift and reveal in May 2020 (also called Life Cycle Impulse) in BMW Driving Center, South Korea. It was planned to be revealed at the 2020 Busan Motor Show, but was delayed due to its cancellation for the COVID-19 pandemic in South Korea. Exterior changes include redesigned front and rear bumper along with new headlights and taillights and a sharper kidney grille design. The daytime running lights have been redesigned, now having a simplified L shape instead of the octagonal shape of the pre-facelift model, making the headlights slimmer. Adaptive LED headlights (previously a cost option) are fitted as standard (in some markets) with buyers having the option to specify the car with matrix LED or laser headlamps. The front bumper is designed to be more angular with the standard models featuring triangular corner air inlets flanking the centre inlet, and the M Sport models getting larger intakes and a U-shaped contour leading into the headlights, similar to the 3 Series.

At the rear, the taillights get the same L-shaped design as the headlights with the former getting 3D lenses and C-Shaped graphics which integrate the main lighting and brake light modules. A twin-pipe exhaust system with trapezoidal outlets is standard on all models with the base models housing them in grey surrounds while the M Sport models get more prominent contours for the exhaust outlets.

Newly added options include 20-inch two-tone aerodynamic wheels and new exterior colours which include Phytonic Blue, Tanzanite Blue, Bernina Grey, and Aventurine Red. The M Sport models also have the option of red brake calipers aside from the standard blue ones. An M Sport Donnington Edition would be available at launch which would be limited to 1,000 units.

On the interior, the basic dashboard design is retained with the biggest highlight being the new touchscreen infotainment system featuring the BMW iDrive 7.0 having over-the-air updates, Personal Assistant Voice Control, integrated Apple Car Play and Android Auto and BMW maps, which is a cloud-based navigation system featuring real-time traffic updates and an improved search function. The infotainment screen measures 10.25-inch as standard but with the BMW Live Cockpit Professional system (which is standard in some markets), measures 12.3-inches. The 5 Series now features the Parking assist system shared with the 3 Series, it has a Reversing Assistant function that enables the car to backtrack where it came from. On top of this, the Parking Assistant Professional incorporates the new Drive Recorder function that can record up to 40 seconds of footage using various cameras.

The engine range has been revamped and features twin-turbocharging for all diesel engines along with optimized direct injection for petrol engines. The hybrid models get a 48-volt system which adds 8 kW (11 hp) to the total engine output. The M550i gets the same engine from the M850i.

== Production ==
Production of the G30 occurred at the BMW Group Plant Dingolfing in Germany, and began in November 2016. All 5 Series long-wheelbase production took place at BMW Brilliance's factory in the Dadong district of Shenyang, China.

In addition, from March 2017, contract manufacturer Magna Steyr began building 5 Series saloons at its factory in Graz, Austria.

Complete knock down (CKD) production of the 5 Series takes place in the following locations:

- 6 October City, Egypt
- Chennai, India
- Jakarta, Indonesia
- Kulim, Malaysia
- Kaliningrad, Russia
- Rayong, Thailand (BMW Manufacturing (Thailand))
- Chu Lai, Quang Nam, Vietnam (Truong Hai Group Corporation)

In November 2021 the M550i xDrive and 540i xDrive had an issue where the traction control interferes with acceleration fixed by over the air updates.

== Safety ==
=== ANCAP ===
ANCAP test results* BMW 5 Series 4 cylinder & 6 cylinder 2WD variants (2017)
Test	Score
Overall	5 /5 stars
Frontal offset	
Side impact	
Pole	
Seat belt reminders	
Whiplash protection	
Pedestrian protection	
Electronic stability control	

=== Euro NCAP ===
The 2017 5 Series received five stars overall in its Euro NCAP test.

Euro NCAP test results* BMW 5 Series (2017)
Test	Points	%
Overall:	5 /5 stars	
Adult occupant:	34.8	91%
Child occupant:	42	85%
Pedestrian:	34.1	81%
Safety assist:	7.1	59%

=== IIHS ===
The G30 5 Series is an Insurance Institute for Highway Safety (IIHS) "Top Safety Pick+" for 2017. The Top Safety Pick+ designation is awarded to cars with 'good' IIHS ratings in the small overlap front, moderate overlap front, side, roof strength, and head restraint tests; 'acceptable' or 'good' headlights; and for having an option for a front crash prevention system with an 'advanced' or 'superior' rating.

== Awards ==
- 2017 What Car?'s 'Car of the Year' and 'Best Luxury Car'.
- 2017 iF product design 'Automobiles/Product Gold Award'
- 2017 AutoExpress Executive Car of the Year
- 2017 EyesOnDesign Award for Best Designed User Experience
