= BMW 7 Series (G70) =

Seventh generation of BMW 7 Series

BMW 7 Series / i7 (G70)
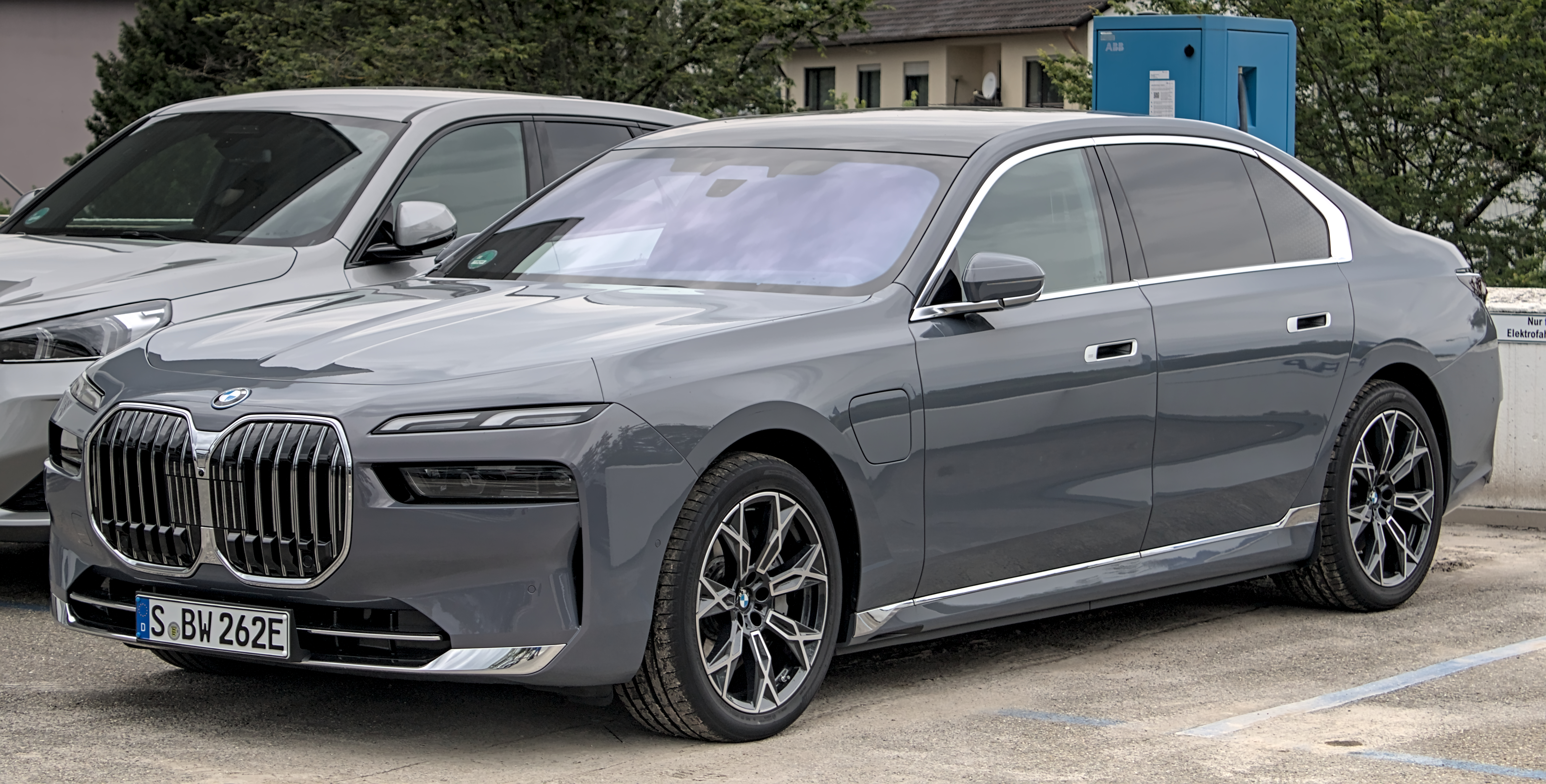
- 2023 BMW 7 Series (Germany)

Overview
- Manufacturer: BMW
- Also called: BMW i7 (electric)
- Production: July 2022 – present
- Model years: 2023–present
- Assembly: Germany: Dingolfing (Dingolfing Plant); Thailand: Rayong (BMW Thailand); Malaysia: Kulim (Inokom); Indonesia: Jakarta (Gaya Motor)
- Designer: Jozef Kabaň, Domagoj Đukec, Sebastian Simm (exterior); Henri von Freyberg (interior)

Body and chassis
- Class: Full-size luxury car (F)
- Body style: 4-door sedan
- Layout: Front-engine, rear-wheel-drive; Front-engine, all-wheel-drive (xDrive); Rear-motor, rear-wheel-drive (i7 eDrive50); Dual-motor, all-wheel-drive (i7 xDrive60, M70)
- Platform: Cluster Architecture (CLAR) (CLAR-II/WE)
- Related: BMW X7 (G07); BMW 5 Series (G60); BMW iX

Powertrain
- Engine: Petrol mild hybrid: 3.0 L B58 turbo I6; 4.4 L S68 twin-turbo V8; Petrol plug-in hybrid: 3.0 L B58 turbo I6; Diesel mild hybrid: 3.0 L B57 turbo I6
- Electric motor: List: 13 kW (17 hp; 18 PS) 48 V electric motor, integrated into transmission (mild hybrid); 145 kW (194 hp; 197 PS) Separately Excited Synchronous Motors (SSMs) (PHEV); 1x or 2× BMW eDrive Separately Excited Synchronous Motors (SSMs) (i7)
- Power output: List: 200 kW (268 hp; 272 PS) (735i); 210 kW (282 hp; 286 PS) (740d xDrive); 280 kW (375 hp; 381 PS) (740i); 335 kW (449 hp; 455 PS) (i7 eDrive50 / i7 50 xDrive); 360 kW (483 hp; 489 PS) (750e xDrive); 400 kW (536 hp; 544 PS) (760i xDrive); 400 kW (536 hp; 544 PS) (i7 xDrive60 / i7 60 xDrive); 420 kW (563 hp; 571 PS) (M760e xDrive); 441 kW (591 hp; 600 PS) (i7 M70 xDrive); 500 kW (671 hp; 680 PS) (i7 M70 xDrive LCI)
- Transmission: 8-speed ZF 8HP automatic; Single-speed (i7)
- Hybrid drivetrain: Mild hybrid; Plug-in hybrid
- Battery: 20 Ah lithium-ion (mild hybrid); 18.7 kWh lithium-ion (plug-in hybrid); 105.7 (101.7 usable) kWh lithium-ion (i7); 118.1 (112.5 usable) kWh Cylindrical cell Li-NMC (i7 LCI)
- Electric range: 488–625 km (303–388 mi) (WLTP, i7); 566–728 km (352–452 mi) (WLTP, i7 LCI)
- Plug-in charging: 7.4 kW (AC, PHEV); Three-phase 11 kW / 22 kW (AC, i7); 195 kW (DC, i7)

Dimensions
- Wheelbase: 3,215 mm (126.6 in)
- Length: 5,391 mm (212.2 in)
- Width: 1,950 mm (76.8 in)
- Height: 1,544 mm (60.8 in)
- Kerb weight: 2,075–2,270 kg (4,575–5,004 lb); 2,595–2,770 kg (5,721–6,107 lb) (i7)

Chronology
- Predecessor: BMW 7 Series (G11)

G70 is the internal designation for the seventh generation of the BMW 7 Series, a range of Full-size luxury cars produced by the German luxury vehicle manufacturer BMW since July 2022.

Introduced in April 2022, "7 Series" and "i7" serve as the respective designations to the automaker's full-size luxury flagship models in internal combustion and battery electric configurations. BMW had unveiled the model on 20 April 2022 during the nameplate's 45th anniversary. Sold onwards as a 2023 model, it is longer than its predecessor model. This model offers petrol and diesel models, that come standard with a 48-volt mild hybrid powertrain; a plug-in hybrid system is available. The seventh-generation BMW 7 Series is often collectively referred to as the G70.

The G70 commenced production on 1 July 2022, exactly seven years after the previous model. The i7 is the first 7 Series to offer a fully electric powertrain, which shares powertrains with the smaller G60 i5. Both 7 Series and i7 offer optional rear- or all-wheel drive drivetrains. The V12 model is no longer offered, instead getting replaced by the M760e plug-in hybrid.

== Development ==
Development of the G70 commenced in 2017 when BMW began conceiving ideas on how they would replace the G11 / G12. Design concepts had been received from design centres in the United States, Europe and Asia. In 2020, the automaker had announced that diesel models would be carried over, as well as an announcing an electric variant, called the "i7", would be available. The model was spied testing in October 2021, which was the same month that BMW CEO of development Frank Weber had announced the G70 and the G60 would both optionally offer Level 3 autonomous driving. Weber had also made plans for the iX to also offer self-driving. On 4 February 2022, the 7 Series was seen testing again, while on the 22nd, the 7 Series had undergone acoustic testing as a pre-production model.

The 7 Series was unveiled on 20 April 2022, with a headlight design reminiscent to those of the X7 facelift. The G70 7 Series is offered with petrol, plug-in hybrid, diesel, and battery electric powertrains, with the latter being marketed as the i7. A V12 petrol engine option is no longer offered. The vehicle is 130 mm (5.1 in) longer, 48 mm (1.9 in) wider and 51 mm (2.0 in) taller compared to the previous generation long-wheelbase model. China is expected to account for 45 per cent of 7 Series sales. Unlike previous generations, BMW will offer only one length of the G70.

The G70 is built upon the rear-wheel drive based Cluster Architecture (CLAR) platform shared with the smaller G60 5 Series. This platform was used on the previous model and underpins vehicle that feature a longitudinally mounted combustion engine or a fully-electric drivetrain.

== Markets ==
=== Europe ===
In Europe, the initial range only consisted of the i7. Internal combustion versions were available at a later date: the 740d xDrive with a B57 3.0-litre turbo six-cylinder outputting 300 PS (296 hp; 221 kW), along with the 750e xDrive and M760e xDrive plug-in hybrid models. The M760e xDrive is the successor to the V12-powered M760Li.

=== North America ===
In North America, three trims are available for its late 2022 introduction, including the electric i7 xDrive60, and the internal combustion 740i and 760i xDrive, both equipped with 48 V mild hybrid systems. In 2023, BMW had announced that the 750e xDrive, eDrive50, and M70 had joined the lineup for the 2024 model year.

=== Asia ===
==== Thailand ====
In Thailand, three trims are available for its November 2022 introduction, including the i7 xDrive60 in 3 models: M Sport, M Sport First Edition, and the range-topping M Sport Gran Lusso. The internal combustion variant with plug-in hybrid model is the 750e xDrive M Sport CKD, introduced in 2023.

==== Malaysia ====
In Malaysia, three variants are available which are the fully electric i7 xDrive60 M Sport, the 750e xDrive Pure Excellence and the 750e xDrive M Sport. The two 750e variants are locally assembled.

==== Indonesia ====
In Indonesia, two variants are available which are the 735i M Sport and i7 xDrive60 Gran Lusso. The 735i M Sport is locally assembled, while the i7 xDrive60 Gran Lusso comes completely built-up from Germany.

== Presentation ==
=== Design and suspension ===
On the front, the G70 incorporates what the brand calls "Iconic Glow", which is BMW's iconic kidney grille that will optionally light up at night to create a kidney effect. The unit features Swarovski crystals as headlamps, which are backlit by fourteen individual LEDs on each side of the vehicle. Unlike the previous model, the G70 aligns the daytime running lamps (DRLs) towards the top of the grille, while a separate panel unit contains the low and high beams positioned towards the middle of the grille, but not connected to it. M Sport models feature a lower front bumper in a contrast colour to the rest of its body, which allowed BMW to add distinct front wheels which creates a more aggressive design compared to its standard specification. Its side profile continues in a familiar way of the front, by keeping its characteristic lines to a minimum. A shoulder line below the glass connects from the daytime running lamps to the edge of the taillights. The Hofmeister kink, an element characteristic of BMW vehicles since the 1950s is placed on the window of the G70. Monotone paint is standard, however two-tone paint is available.

The i7's drag coefficient is rated at 0.24 C_{d}, while on ICE models it increases to 0.26 due to engine cooling. As standard, the G70 features double wishbone aluminium suspension at the front, while it features Integral-V multi-link aluminium rear suspension. The G70 additionally features adaptive air suspension, active anti-roll bars, and adaptive dampers. The G70 also features all-wheel steering (Integral Active Steering) with up to 3.5 degrees of turning angle and a 0.76 m (2.5 ft) smaller turning circle of 13.1 m (43 ft) at low speeds. The "Executive Drive Pro" package is available and adds Active Roll Stabilisation and Active Roll Comfort. Unlike its predecessor, the G70 fails to maintain a perfect 50:50 weight distribution, instead has a 49:51 distribution for the base model, and 45:55 for the 760i variant.

A Pure Excellence design package is available and adds chrome exterior elements and grey brake calipers. The M Sport package offers M Sport Pro package adds M Sport brakes with black gloss calipers, black gloss rear spoiler, an individual high-gloss shadow line on the grille frame and struts, and rear apron trim. The M Performance package adds high-gloss grille surrounds and grille struts, M Sport brakes and a high-gloss black rear spoiler.

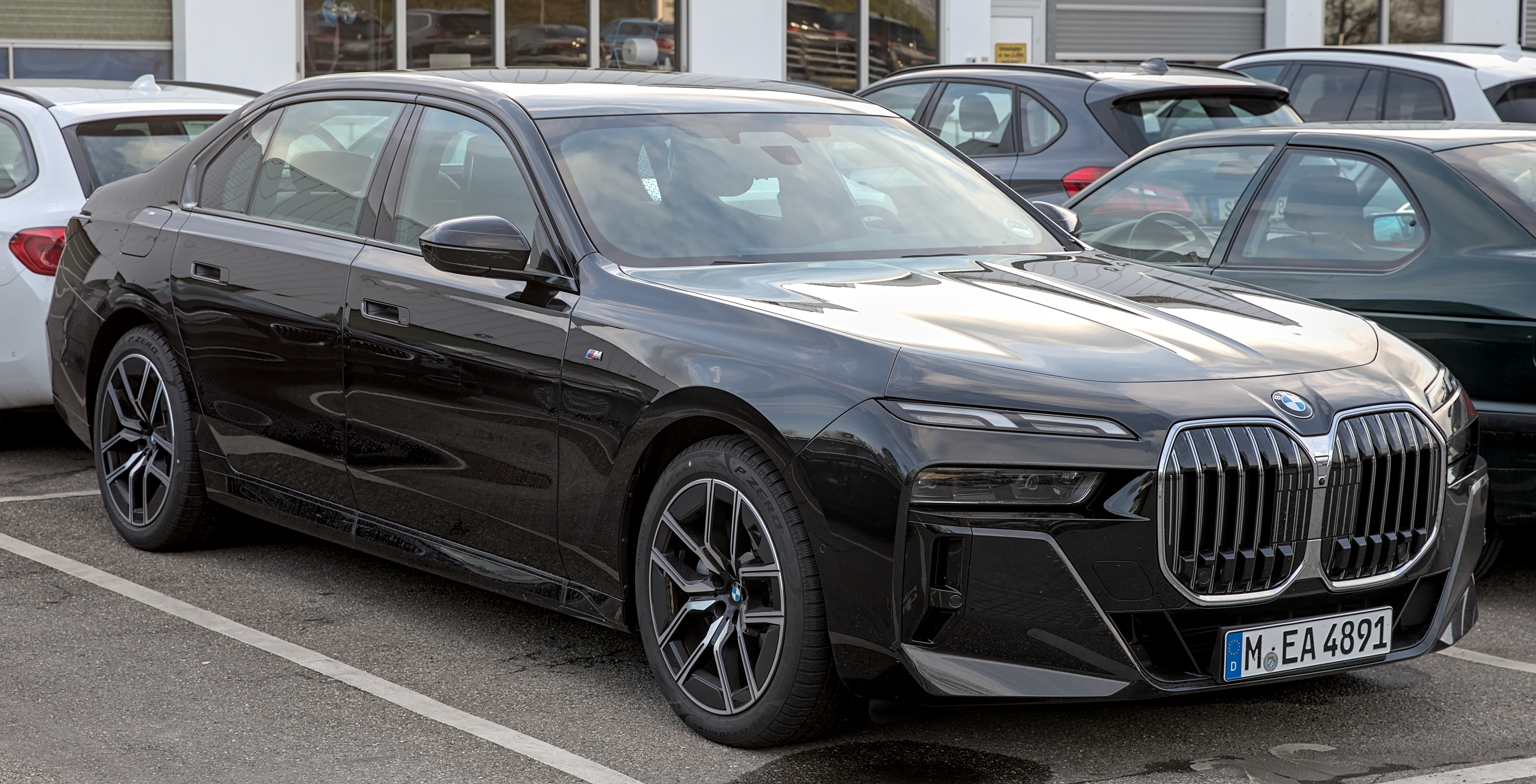
2023 BMW 740d xDrive

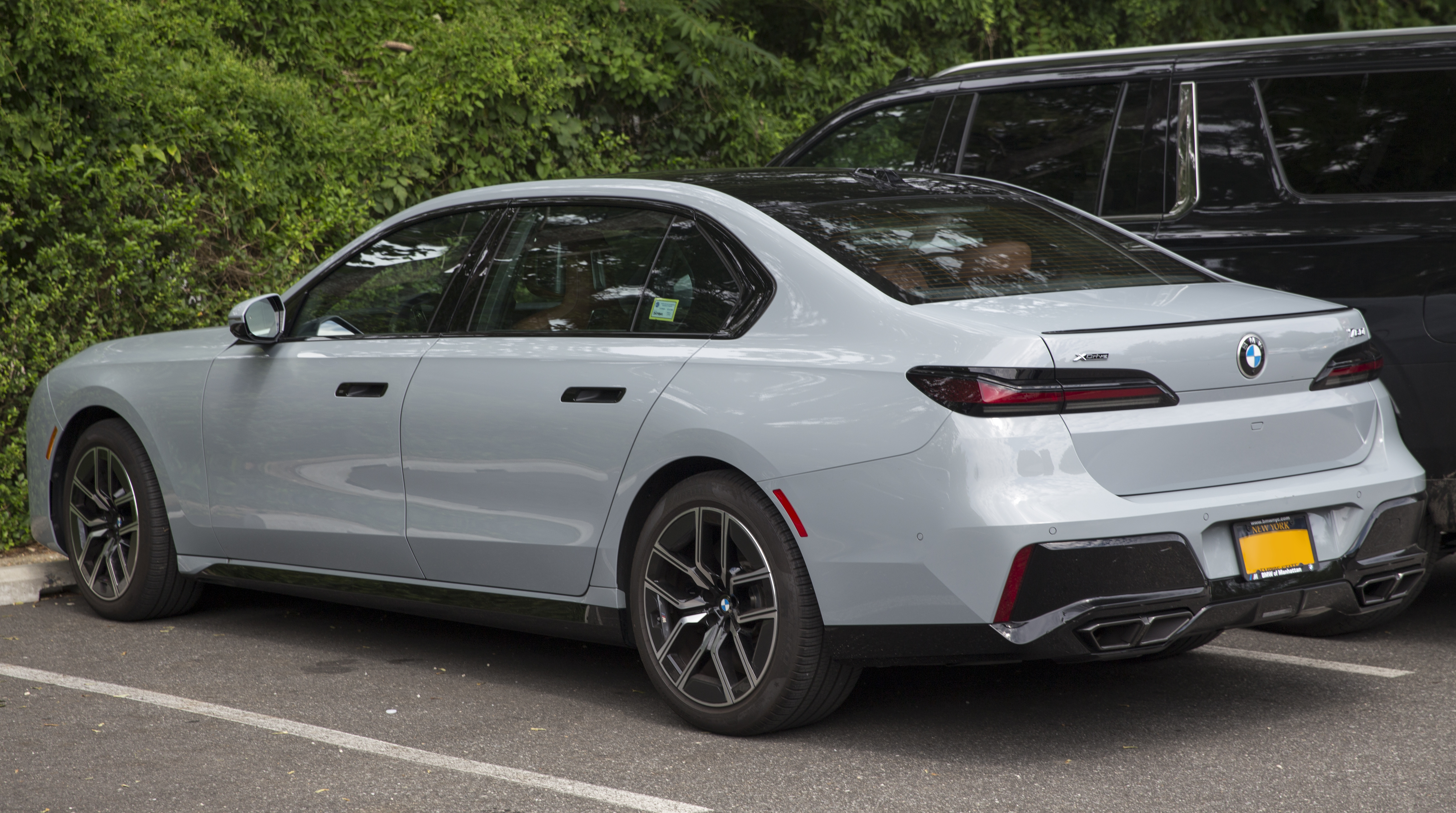
2023 BMW 760i xDrive rear view

=== Interior and equipment ===
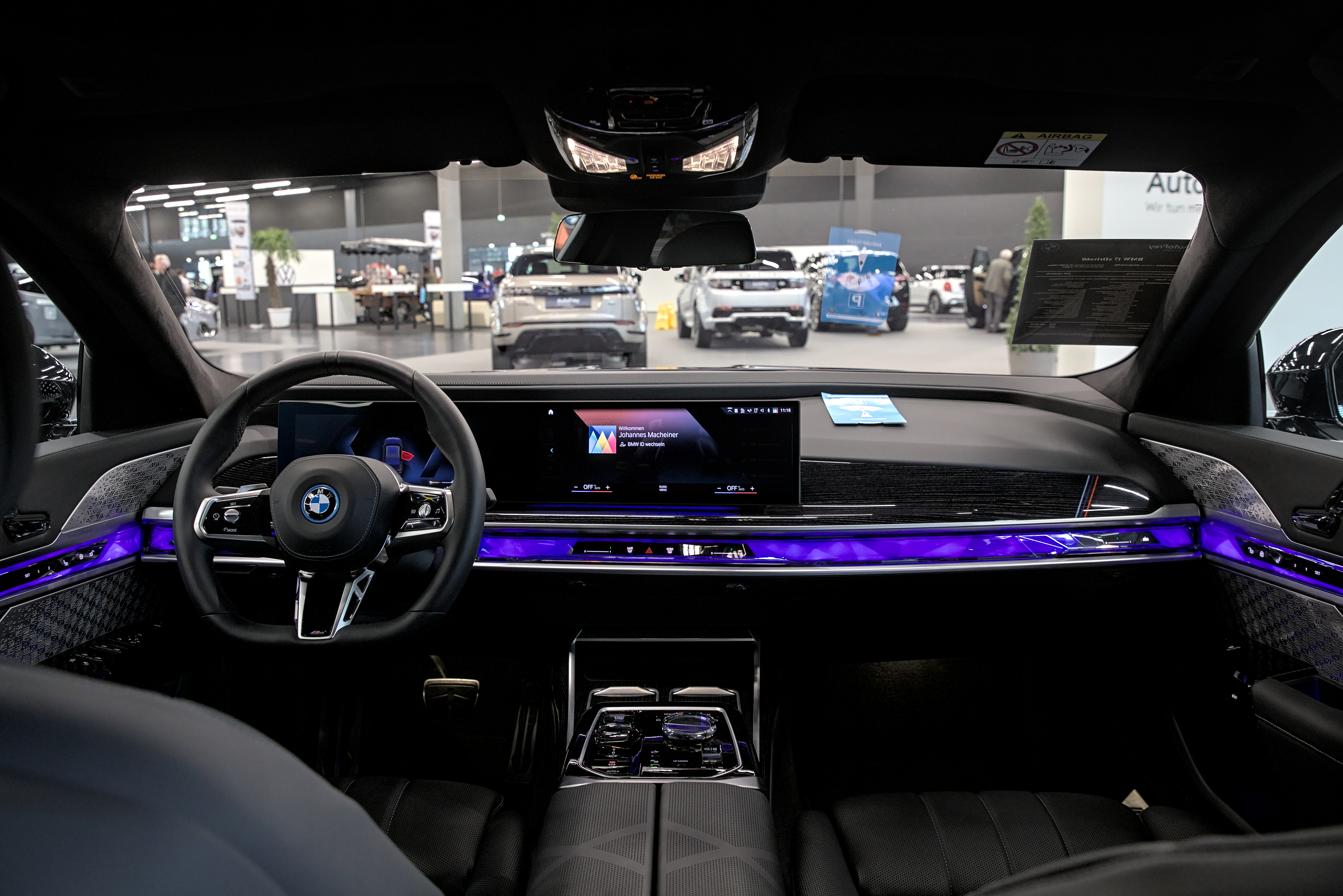
Interior featuring the iDrive 8 infotainment system

The G70 receives the BMW Live Cockpit setup, which combines a 310 mm (12.3 in) digital instrument cluster with a BMW's 14.9 in (380 mm) Curved Display for the infotainment touchscreen, which both run BMW iDrive 8, the newest iteration of BMW's infotainment system. The G70 also features navigation, Wireless Apple CarPlay and Android Auto, DAB+ radio, over-the-air updating, and a range of third-party apps as well as in-car gaming. Additionally, a head-up display with different views is standard. Optional on the 7 Series is a large 800 mm (31.3 in), 8,000-pixel "Theatre Screen". When being used, this display can stream movies and shows from Amazon Fire TV via the eSIM connection, or a device can be hooked up via an HDMI cable to stream any show. A camera is standard on the screen, which can stream meetings or video calls while in the vehicle. Buyers may subscribe to other streaming services such as Netflix, Hulu and Max. Additional luxuries include heated front and rear seats, heated steering wheel, heated surface, front centre console armrest, front seat ventilation, front seat massage function, quad-zone climate control, and BMW's Panoramic Glass Roof Sky Lounge.

The BMW ConnectedDrive system features Intelligent Emergency Call, BMW TeleServices, BMW Intelligent Personal Assistant, Remote Software Update, and Remote Services. The G70 features multi-functional seats, with front electric adjustment with lumbar, electric adjustment of headrests, and a memory function. Six USB-C sockets are featured, as well as four 12-volt power sockets.

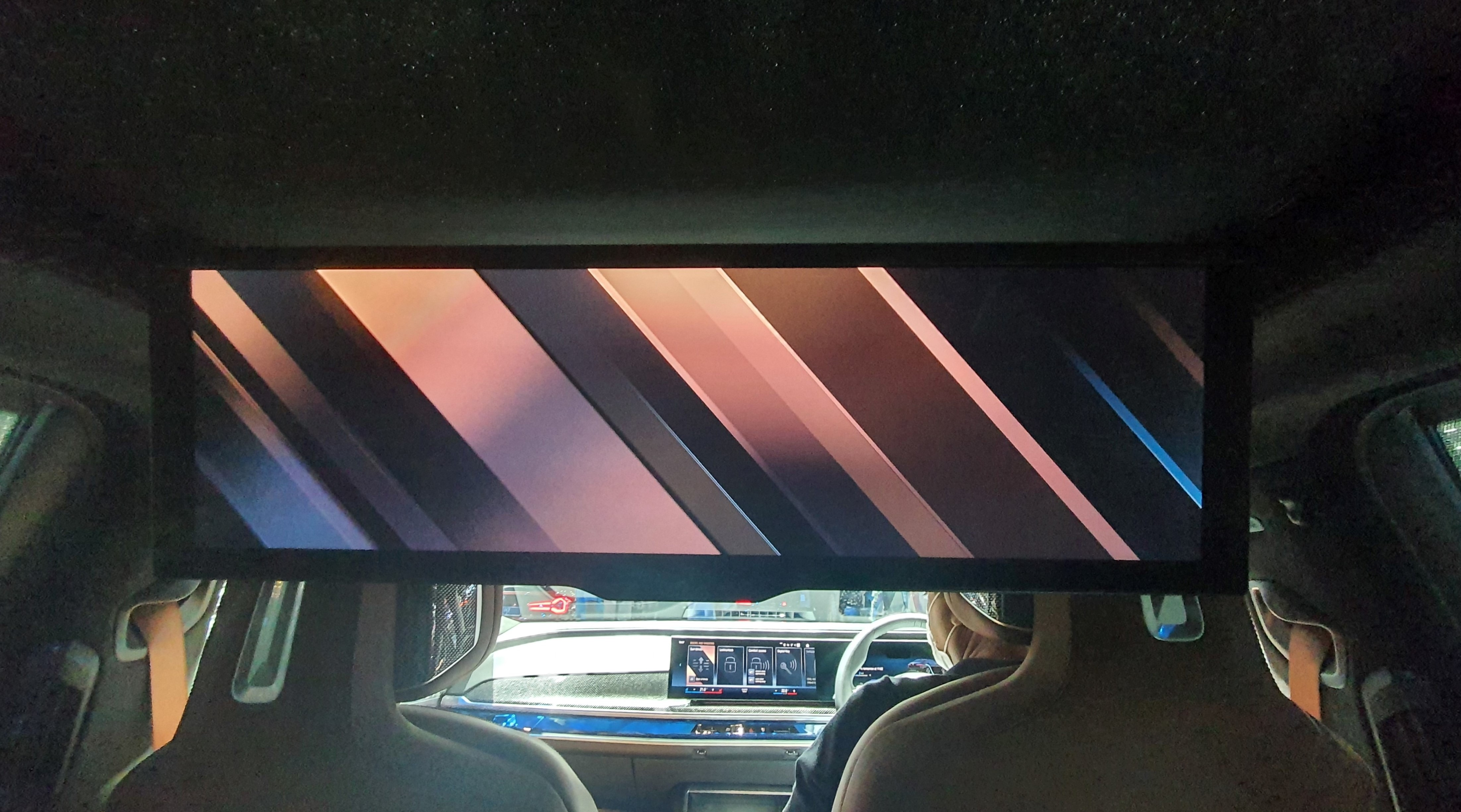
Rear cabin with the 790 mm (31 in), 8K Theatre Screen

The 7 Series models feature a 655-watt, 18-speaker Bowers & Wilkins surround sound system as standard, with a 1965-watt, 35-speaker "Diamond" Surround system with 4D technology optional. Multiple BMW models from 2022 feature the "Rear Lounge" package, which allows the rear-left passenger to recline their chair. Heating, ventilation, as well as massaging functions come with this package. These are all controlled by 5.5 in (140 mm) touchscreens integrated into the doors.

For the first time on a 7 Series, select models are available in a leather-free configuration. This 7 Series generation features perforated Veganza leather trim covering the seats, dashboard, and steering wheel. The synthetic material offers improved haptics and optimises climate assets. The Veganza leather is available in colours consisting Black, Black with Burgundy, Cognac, and Mocha.

The 7 Series features airbags for the driver, front passenger, two on the curtain, drivers side, front passenger side, and front center. The 7 Series and i7 feature the Driving Assistant as standard, which adds adaptive cruise control with the Stop & Go system, lane change warning, lane departure warning, both front and rear cross-traffic alert, rear collision prevention, road exit warning, Steering and Lane Control Assistant, automatic Speed limit assist, evasion assistant, Front Brake Intervention, and forward collision warning.

This model also features a boot/trunk of 540 litres (19.1 cu ft), while plug-in hybrid models have a space of 525 litres (18.5 cu ft) due to electrical components such as the battery and motor. Wheel sizes range from 19- to 21-inches.

BMW Personal Pilot L3 is available for the 7 Series in Germany starting March 2024.

== Facelift ==
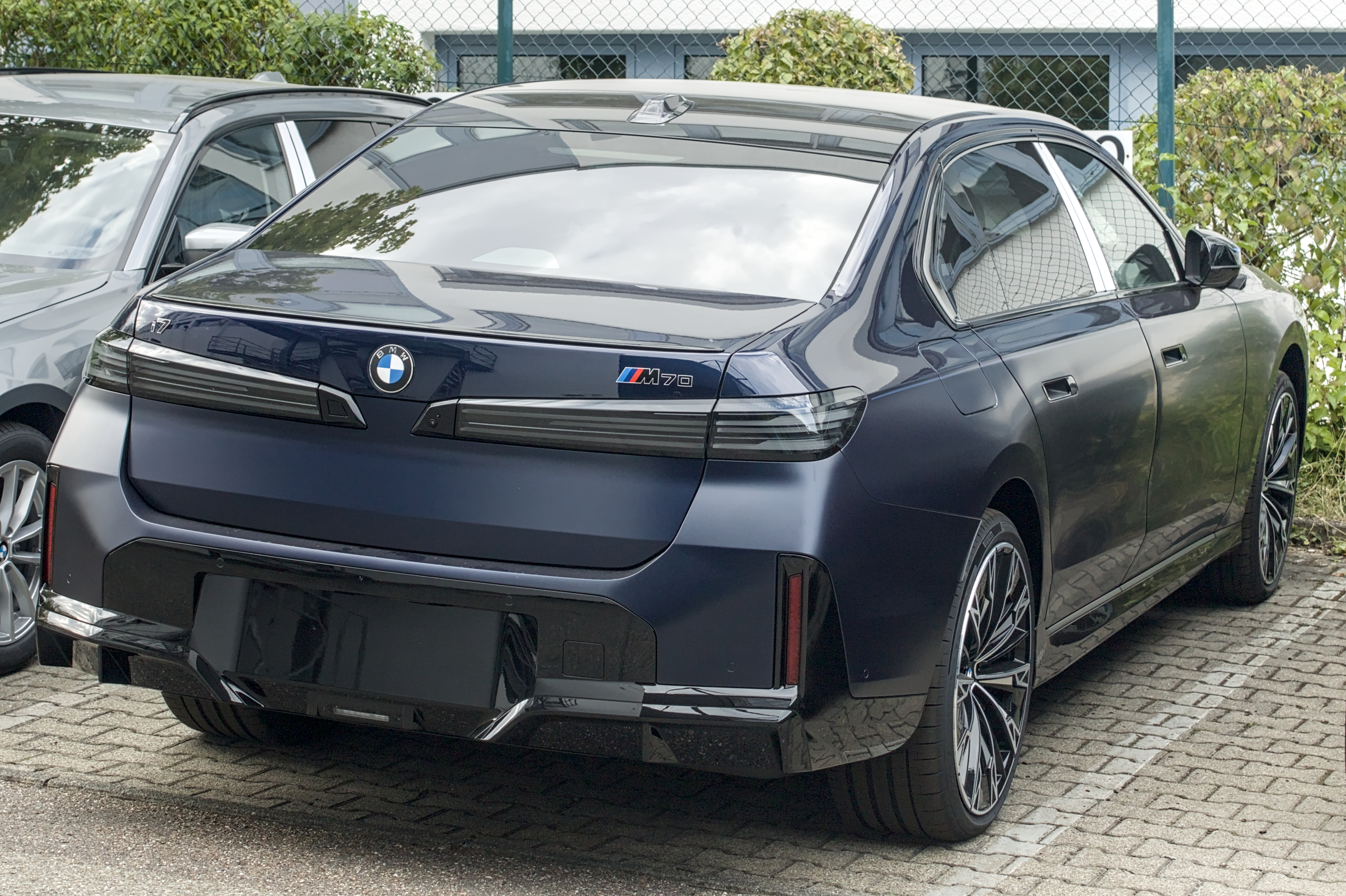
BMW i7 M70 (facelift)

The facelifted version for the G70 7-Series (and i7) was unveiled on 22 April 2026 for the 2027 model year.

The exterior was thoroughly updated. The front includes new daytime running lights that retain the dual-lamp signature, optionally offered with diamond-cut crystal glass elements featuring 12 pieces per light, new Iconic Glow kidney grilles and a reshaped bumper. Similar to the i3 and iX3, the hood was also reshaped with sharp creases that emphasize the updated BMW roundel logo. New monotone and two-tone paint finishes are available, with a new Individual option that combines a metallic upper section and a matte lower section, requiring 75 hours of manual paint processes. The new taillights use a smoked glass housing and include a dual-line motif with inner chrome lines, while the rear bumper was redesigned with fewer lines. The front and rear fascias differ based on whether the Pure Excellence or M Sport appearance packages are chosen. This is also the first 7-Series to offer 22-inch wheels.

The interior was redesigned, with influences from the Neue Klasse design language first seen on the i3 and iX3. This includes revised steering wheels, the Panoramic Vision display, 17.9-inch central touchscreen and 3D heads-up display, as well as a new 14.6-inch passenger display. The rear retains the optional 31.3-inch theatre display.

In terms of powertrains, the G70 facelift retains petrol, diesel, hybrid and battery electric (for the i7) powertrains. This includes the 740, 740d, 750e, M760e, i7 50, i7 60 and i7 M70, all with xDrive. For the i7, BMW claims up to 452 mi (727 km) of WLTP range and 350 mi (563 km) of EPA range, as well as a peak charging speed of 250 kW, enabling a 10–80% charge in 28 minutes.

== Specifications ==
Mild hybrid models feature a 48-volt starter-generator/electric motor integrated into the transmission, which is paired with a 20 Ah lithium-ion battery to increase efficiency and power delivery. Plug-in hybrid models feature a permanent-magnet synchronous motor, paired with an 18.7 kWh lithium-ion battery. All models except the i7 feature a ZF 8HP transmission, which is an 8-speed automatic transmission produced by ZF Friedrichshafen. Rear-wheel drive is standard, however four-wheel drive which use BMW's xDrive system is available on higher-end models. All 7 Series models have a top speed of 250 km/h (155 mph). Maximum charging for the plug-in hybrid models has been upgraded from 3.7 kilowatts to 7.4, allowing the battery to be charged from 0 to 100 per cent in just shy of three hours using BMW's wallbox charger. The 750e model has a fully-electric driving range of 77–87 km (48–54 mi), while the M760e has an all-electric range of 77–85 km (48–53 mi), both as per WLTP standards. Driving in fully electric mode for plug-in hybrids allows speeds up to 140 km/h (87 mph).

Specifications for the G70 (ICE)
Type	Model	Engine code	Displ.	Power	Torque	Combined system output	Electric motor	Battery	0–100 km/h (0–62 mph)	Trans.	Layout	Cal. years
Petrol mild hybrid	735i	B58	2,998 cc (3.0 L) I6	Engine: 213 kW; 290 PS (286 hp) @ 5,000-6,500 rpm Motor: 13 kW; 18 PS (18 hp)	Engine: 400 N⋅m (40.8 kg⋅m; 295 lb⋅ft) @ 1,750-4,500 rpm Motor: 200 N⋅m (20.4 kg⋅m; 148 lb⋅ft)	-	Integrated starter generator (Note: Integrated into the transmission)	20 Ah lithium-ion	6.7 s	8-speed ZF 8HP automatic	RWD	
Petrol mild hybrid	735i	B58	2,998 cc (3.0 L) I6	Engine: 213 kW; 290 PS (286 hp) @ 5,000-6,500 rpm Motor: 13 kW; 18 PS (18 hp)	Engine: 400 N⋅m (40.8 kg⋅m; 295 lb⋅ft) @ 1,750-4,500 rpm Motor: 200 N⋅m (20.4 kg⋅m; 148 lb⋅ft)	-	Integrated starter generator	20 Ah lithium-ion	6.7 s	8-speed ZF 8HP automatic	RWD	2022–present
Petrol mild hybrid	740i	B58	2,998 cc (3.0 L) I6	Engine: 284 kW; 386 PS (381 hp) @ 5,200-6,250 rpm Motor: 13 kW; 18 PS (18 hp)	Engine: 520 N⋅m (53.0 kg⋅m; 384 lb⋅ft) @ 1,850-5,000 rpm Motor: 200 N⋅m (20.4 kg⋅m; 148 lb⋅ft)	-	Integrated starter generator	20 Ah lithium-ion	5.4 s	8-speed ZF 8HP automatic	RWD	2022–present
Petrol mild hybrid	740i	B58	2,998 cc (3.0 L) I6	Engine: 284 kW; 386 PS (381 hp) @ 5,200-6,250 rpm Motor: 13 kW; 18 PS (18 hp)	Engine: 520 N⋅m (53.0 kg⋅m; 384 lb⋅ft) @ 1,850-5,000 rpm Motor: 200 N⋅m (20.4 kg⋅m; 148 lb⋅ft)	-	Integrated starter generator	20 Ah lithium-ion	5.4 s	8-speed ZF 8HP automatic	RWD	2022–present
Petrol mild hybrid	760i xDrive	S68	4,395 cc (4.4 L) V8	Engine: 400 kW; 544 PS (537 hp) @ 5,500 rpm Motor: 13 kW; 18 PS (18 hp)	Engine: 750 N⋅m (76.5 kg⋅m; 553 lb⋅ft) @ 1,800-5,000 rpm Motor: 200 N⋅m (20.4 kg⋅m; 148 lb⋅ft)	-	Integrated starter generator	20 Ah lithium-ion	4.2 s	8-speed ZF 8HP automatic	AWD	2022–present
Petrol mild hybrid	760i xDrive	S68	4,395 cc (4.4 L) V8	Engine: 400 kW; 544 PS (537 hp) @ 5,500 rpm Motor: 13 kW; 18 PS (18 hp)	Engine: 750 N⋅m (76.5 kg⋅m; 553 lb⋅ft) @ 1,800-5,000 rpm Motor: 200 N⋅m (20.4 kg⋅m; 148 lb⋅ft)	-	Integrated starter generator	20 Ah lithium-ion	4.2 s	8-speed ZF 8HP automatic	AWD	2022–present
Petrol plug-in hybrid	750e xDrive	B58	2,998 cc (3.0 L) I6	Engine: 228 kW; 310 PS (306 hp) @ 5,000-6,500 rpm Motor: 145 kW; 197 PS (194 hp)	Engine: 450 N⋅m (45.9 kg⋅m; 332 lb⋅ft) @ 1,750-4,700 rpm Motor: 280 N⋅m (28.6 kg⋅m; 207 lb⋅ft)	360 kW; 490 PS (483 hp) / 700 N⋅m (71.4 kg⋅m; 516 lb⋅ft)	Permanent-magnet synchronous motor	18.7 kWh lithium-ion	4.8 s	8-speed ZF 8HP automatic	AWD	2022–present
Petrol plug-in hybrid	750e xDrive	B58	2,998 cc (3.0 L) I6	Engine: 228 kW; 310 PS (306 hp) @ 5,000-6,500 rpm Motor: 145 kW; 197 PS (194 hp)	Engine: 450 N⋅m (45.9 kg⋅m; 332 lb⋅ft) @ 1,750-4,700 rpm Motor: 280 N⋅m (28.6 kg⋅m; 207 lb⋅ft)	360 kW; 490 PS (483 hp) / 700 N⋅m (71.4 kg⋅m; 516 lb⋅ft)	Permanent-magnet synchronous motor	18.7 kWh lithium-ion	4.8 s	8-speed ZF 8HP automatic	AWD	2022–present
Petrol plug-in hybrid	M760e xDrive	B58	2,998 cc (3.0 L) I6	Engine: 280 kW; 380 PS (375 hp) @ 5,200-6,250 rpm Motor: 145 kW; 197 PS (194 hp)	Engine: 520 N⋅m (53.0 kg⋅m; 384 lb⋅ft) @ 1,850-5,000 rpm Motor: 280 N⋅m (28.6 kg⋅m; 207 lb⋅ft)	418 kW; 568 PS (560 hp) / 800 N⋅m (81.6 kg⋅m; 590 lb⋅ft)	Permanent-magnet synchronous motor	18.7 kWh lithium-ion	4.3 s	8-speed ZF 8HP automatic	AWD	2022–present
Petrol plug-in hybrid	M760e xDrive	B58	2,998 cc (3.0 L) I6	Engine: 280 kW; 380 PS (375 hp) @ 5,200-6,250 rpm Motor: 145 kW; 197 PS (194 hp)	Engine: 520 N⋅m (53.0 kg⋅m; 384 lb⋅ft) @ 1,850-5,000 rpm Motor: 280 N⋅m (28.6 kg⋅m; 207 lb⋅ft)	418 kW; 568 PS (560 hp) / 800 N⋅m (81.6 kg⋅m; 590 lb⋅ft)	Permanent-magnet synchronous motor	18.7 kWh lithium-ion	4.3 s	8-speed ZF 8HP automatic	AWD	2022–present
Diesel mild hybrid	740d	B57	2,993 cc (3.0 L) I6	Engine: 223 kW; 303 PS (299 hp) @ 4,000 rpm Motor: 13 kW; 18 PS (18 hp)	Engine: 650 N⋅m (66.3 kg⋅m; 479 lb⋅ft) @ 1,500-2,500 rpm Motor: 200 N⋅m (20.4 kg⋅m; 148 lb⋅ft)	-	Integrated starter generator	20 Ah lithium-ion	6.0 s	8-speed ZF 8HP automatic	RWD	2022–present
Diesel mild hybrid	740d	B57	2,993 cc (3.0 L) I6	Engine: 223 kW; 303 PS (299 hp) @ 4,000 rpm Motor: 13 kW; 18 PS (18 hp)	Engine: 650 N⋅m (66.3 kg⋅m; 479 lb⋅ft) @ 1,500-2,500 rpm Motor: 200 N⋅m (20.4 kg⋅m; 148 lb⋅ft)	-	Integrated starter generator	20 Ah lithium-ion	6.0 s	8-speed ZF 8HP automatic	RWD	2022–present
Diesel mild hybrid	740d xDrive	B57	2,993 cc (3.0 L) I6	Engine: 223 kW; 303 PS (299 hp) @ 4,000 rpm Motor: 13 kW; 18 PS (18 hp)	Engine: 650 N⋅m (66.3 kg⋅m; 479 lb⋅ft) @ 1,500-2,500 rpm Motor: 200 N⋅m (20.4 kg⋅m; 148 lb⋅ft)	-	Integrated starter generator	20 Ah lithium-ion	5.8 s	8-speed ZF 8HP automatic	AWD	2022–present
Diesel mild hybrid	740d xDrive	B57	2,993 cc (3.0 L) I6	Engine: 223 kW; 303 PS (299 hp) @ 4,000 rpm Motor: 13 kW; 18 PS (18 hp)	Engine: 650 N⋅m (66.3 kg⋅m; 479 lb⋅ft) @ 1,500-2,500 rpm Motor: 200 N⋅m (20.4 kg⋅m; 148 lb⋅ft)	-	Integrated starter generator	20 Ah lithium-ion	5.8 s	8-speed ZF 8HP automatic	AWD	2022–present

== BMW i7 ==
The BMW i7 model is the battery electric variant of the G70. Unveiled simultaneously with its ICE counterpart, the vehicle features a similar powertrain setup to the iX crossover SUV: an excited synchronous electric motor at the rear on rear-wheel drive models and a motor at both front and rear axles on all-wheel drive models. These models are built upon a 400 V battery architecture. The i7 is the only model to be available with the Executive Lounge package. These models are built at the same assembly line in Dingolfing has the internal combustion models, as well as its E-segment counterpart.

The models are fitted with BMW's in-house electric motors, seen on the I20 iX and the G60 i5. The i7's gross and usable battery capacities are 105.7 kWh and 101.7 kWh, respectively. The lithium-ion units have a battery voltage of 376.4 V, producing an all-electric range of up to 625 km (388 mi). The single-motor eDrive50, which was introduced in May 2023 as the entry-level i7, features BMW's eDrive which produces an output of 335 kW (449 hp) and 650 N⋅m (479 lbf⋅ft). Its estimated all-electric range is 575–611 km (357–380 mi) at a WLTP standard. The xDrive60 features dual eDrive motors which produce a combined output of 400 kW (540 hp) and 745 N⋅m (549 lbf⋅ft). All-electric driving ranges from 591–625 km (367–388 mi). The range-topping M70 xDrive model features dual eDrive motors that produce a combined output of 485 kW (650 hp) and 1,100 N⋅m (811 lbf⋅ft).

The i7 has minimal updates to the regenerative braking system from the full-electric iX and i4 models. The driver can select different regenerative braking levels and use the highest level for one-pedal driving. Adaptive recuperation is the standard configuration when in driving position D. The driver can experience three levels of brake regeneration settings, low, medium and high.

Batteries are positioned beneath the floor, and due to this, boot/trunk space decreases from 540 litres (19 cu ft) on the ICE models to 500 litres (18 cu ft).

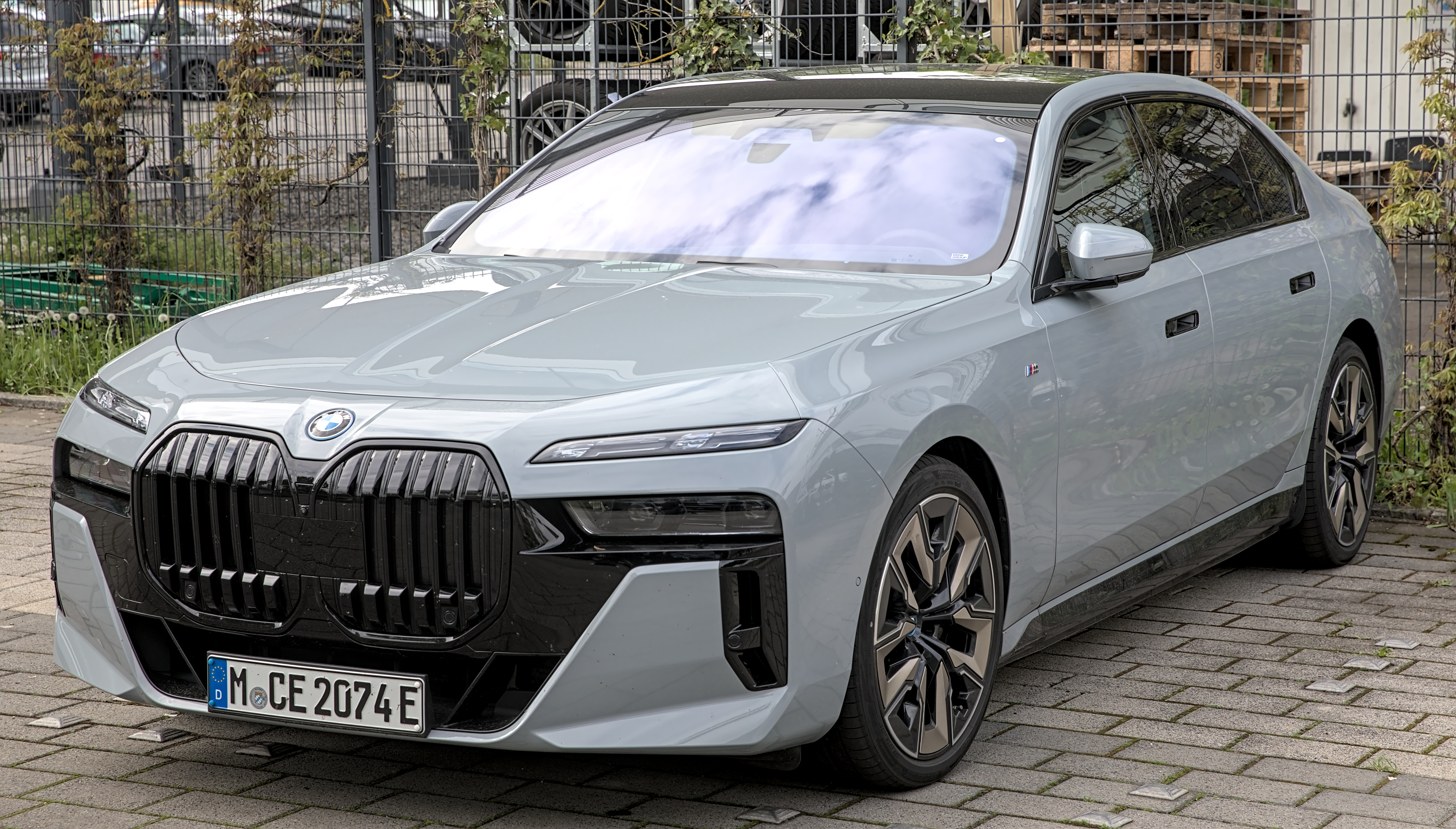
i7 xDrive60 M Sport

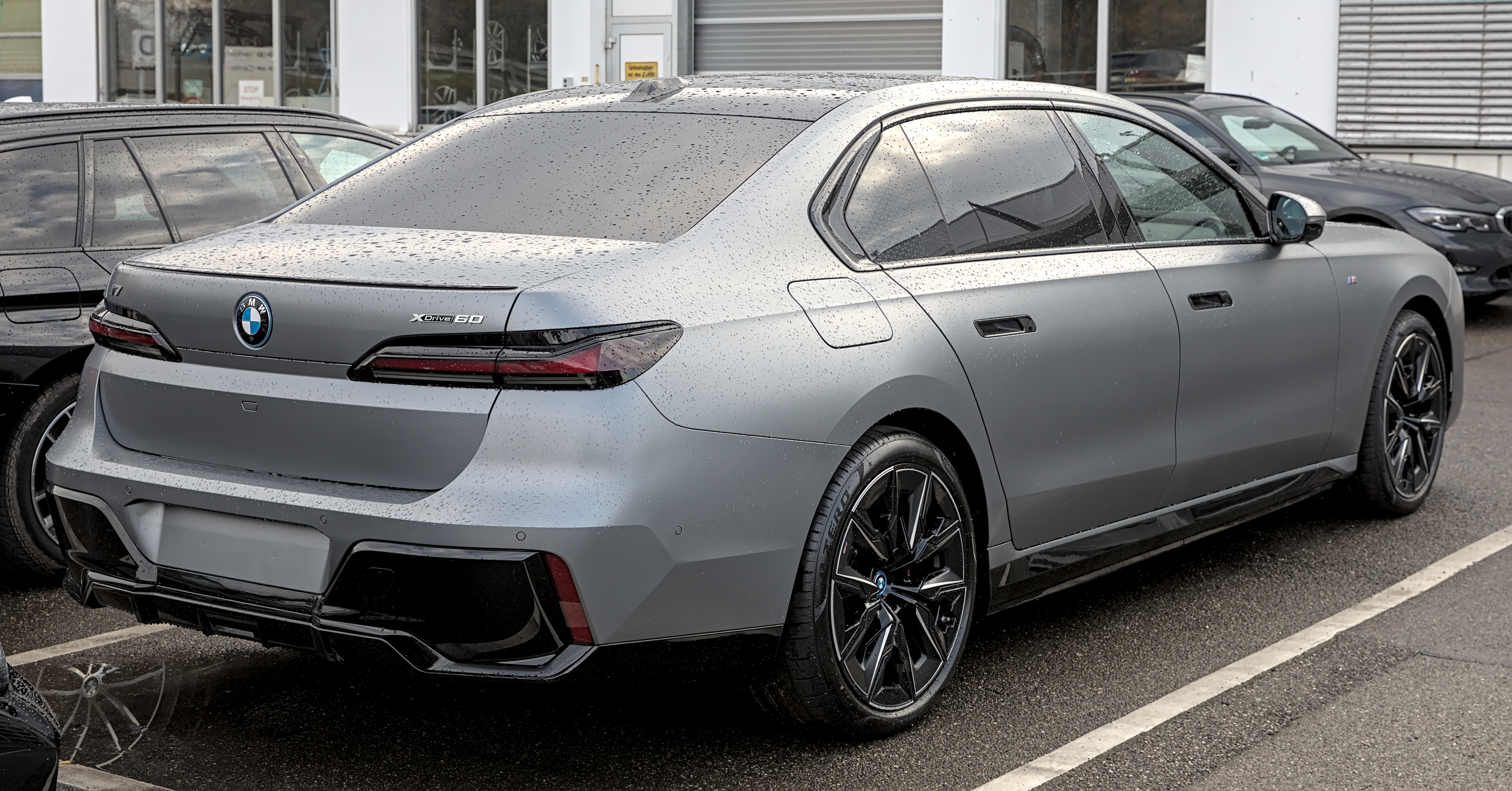
i7 xDrive60 M Sport rear view

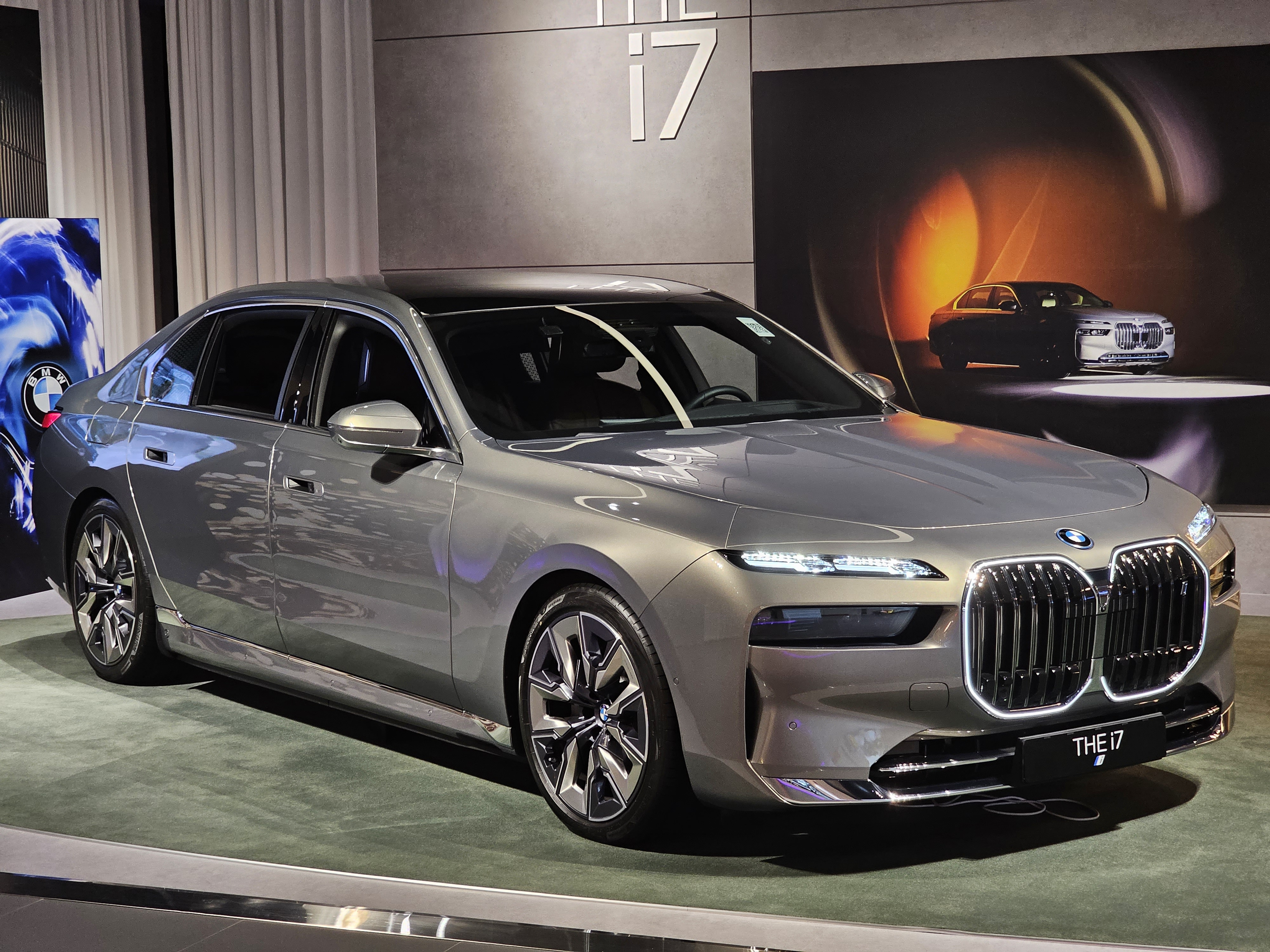
i7 xDrive60 Pure Excellence

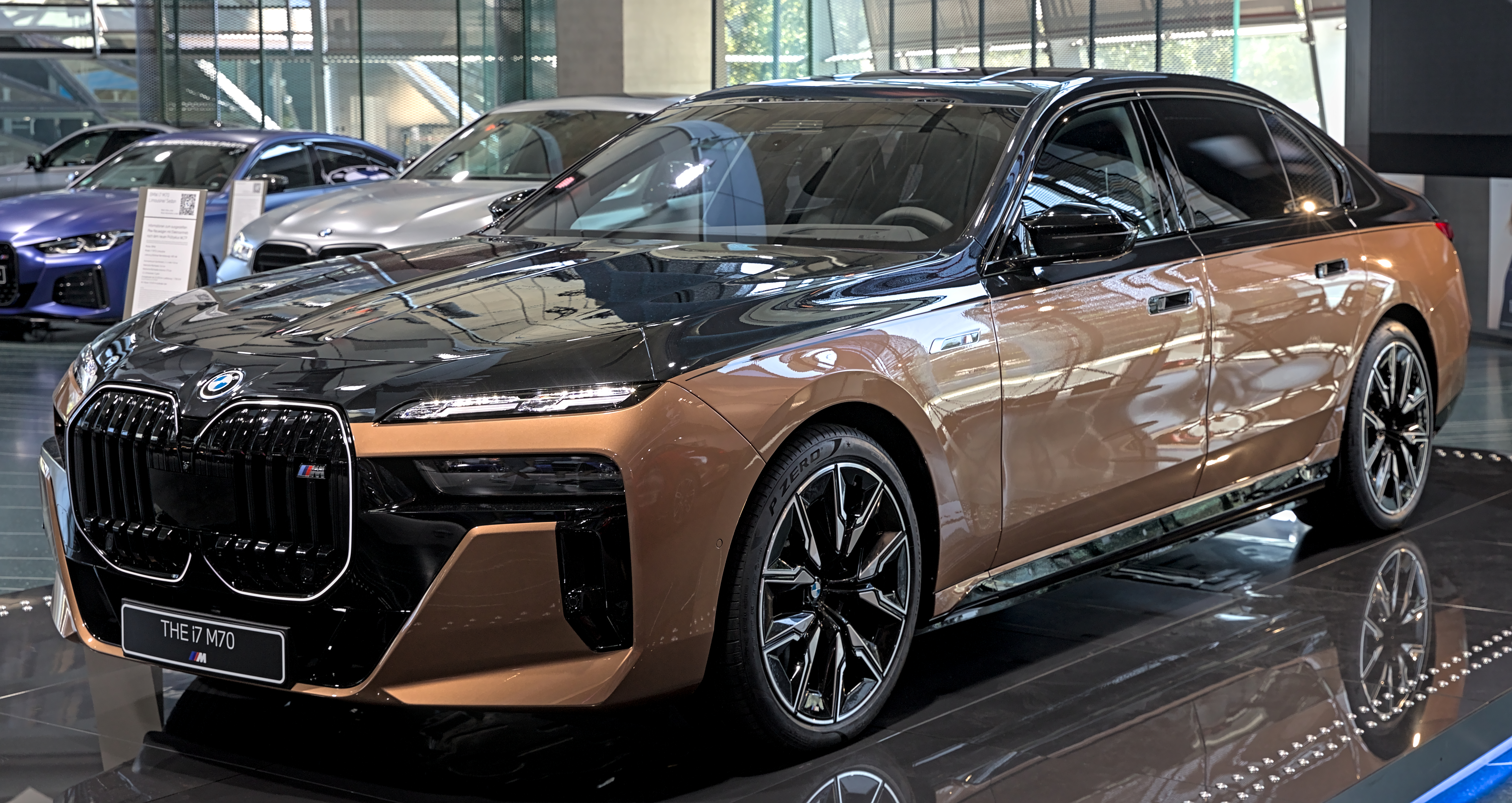
i7 M70 xDrive

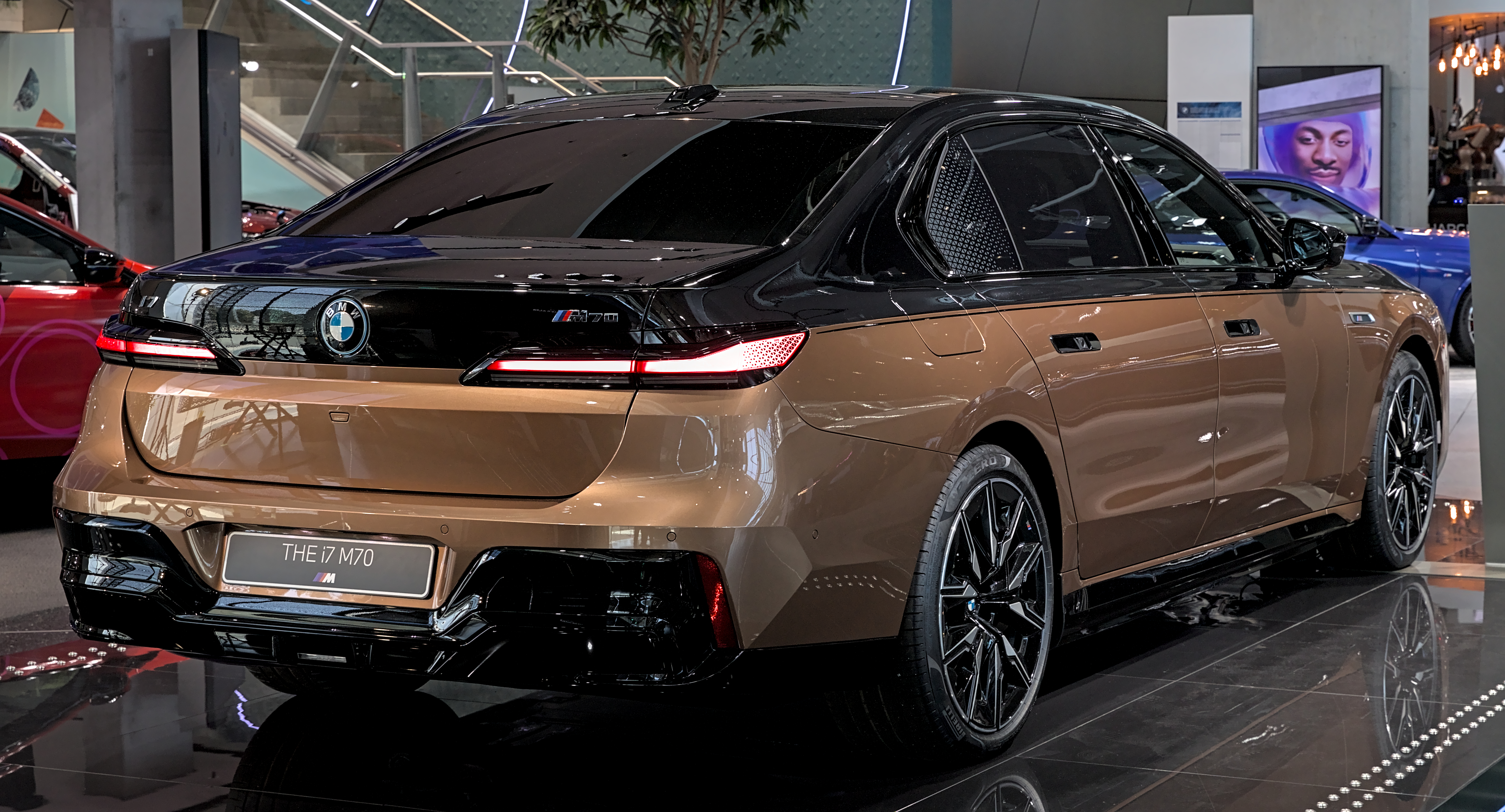
i7 M70 rear view

=== Charging ===
For the eDrive50 and xDrive60 models, AC slow charging via an 11 kW Type 2 connector will take 11 hours. DC fast charging for the eDrive50 and xDrive60 at a capacity of 195-200 kW via a CCS port for a 10-80% charge will take a time of 28 minutes. The M70 model uses the same charging ports as the other i7s, however, slow charging will take a time of 5 hours and 30 minutes. BMW's available wallbox charger can charge at a rate of up to 22 kW and will take just shy of 10 hours. The i7s also come with the Flexible Fast Charger compatible with any 120 or 240V outlet. A 0-100% charge will take just under 12 hours. In the US, the i7 is able to charge with the "Electrify America" DC fast charger, which may add 180 to 200 mi (290 to 320 km) of electric range in a 30-minute session. The model can also charge with a J1772 port in North America with a control box (32A adjustable).

=== Models ===
Specifications
Model	eDrive50	xDrive60	M70 xDrive
Powertrain	Rear-motor, rear-wheel drive	Dual-motor all-wheel drive (xDrive)	
Production Starts From	May 2023–	November 2022–	May 2023–
Battery capacity	105.7 kWh gross (101.7 kWh usable)		
Range	TBA	591–625 km (367–388 mi)^{WLTP}	488–560 km (303–348 mi)^{WLTP}
Motor	1x 3-phase excited synchronous motor (BMW eDrive)	2x 3-phase excited synchronous motor (BMW eDrive)	
Power (peak)	335 kW (449 hp; 455 PS)	400 kW (536 hp; 544 PS)	485 kW (650 hp; 659 PS)
Torque (peak)	650 N⋅m (479 lbf⋅ft)	745 N⋅m (549 lbf⋅ft)	1,100 N⋅m (811 lbf⋅ft)
Acceleration 0–100 km/h (62 mph)	5.5 seconds	4.7 seconds	3.7 seconds
Top Speed	205 km/h (127 mph)	240 km/h (149 mph)	250 km/h (155 mph)
DC Fast Charge (DCFC) Speed	Up to DC 200 kW via CCS Combo 2		
AC On-board Charge Speed	AC 11 kW via J1772 (North America) or 3-phase AC 11 kW via Type 2 (elsewhere). 22 kW connector is available		
Kerb weight	2,595 kg (5,721 lb)	2,640 kg (5,820 lb)	2,695–2,770 kg (5,941–6,107 lb)
Gross weight	3,130 kg (6,900 lb)	3,250 kg (7,165 lb)	3,250 kg (7,165 lb)

== Special models ==
=== BMW 7 First Edition ===
BMW Japan celebrated the start of production for the G70 by making a limited edition "First Edition" model. This model is available in three trims: 740i Excellence, 740i M Sport, and the battery electric i7 xDrive60 Excellence. All models feature the 31.3 in (800 mm) 8K rear screen in the rear passenger area with a 1,965W, 40-speaker Bowers & Wilkins sound system. This model also adds the Rear Comfort package that will feature multi-function rear seats with heating, ventilation, and massaging. 150 examples were made, and the model was available from the final quarter of 2022.

=== BMW 7 Protection (G73) ===
Internally designated G73, the BMW 7 Series Protection is an armoured variant of the G70. This model is a bulletproof variant, and is available in both 760i and i7 guises. The armoured G73 was unveiled in August 2023, and revives the tradition of the Protected 7 Series line that was first introduced on the E38 "Protection Line" model, but was discontinued on the G11. The G73 features a "Protection Core", which allows it to survive ballistic attacks or explosions, proven by extensive studies officially confirmed by German test facility Beschussamt München. Passenger doors can be equipped with the emergency exit system. The armoured inner core surrounds the passenger compartment and invisibly protects the occupants of the vehicle. The G73 also includes the BMW Protection Command Touch System, which features protection-relevant options and additional comfort features. The vehicle also features 20-inch alloy wheels with Michelin PAX system tires. These wheels help for shorter braking distance and improved acceleration. Compared to the standard specification 760i which has a top speed of 250 km/h (155 mph) and a 0–100 km/h (0–62 mph) time of 4.2 seconds, the armoured variant has an electronically limited top speed of 210 km/h (130 mph) and a 0–100 km/h (62 mph) time of 6.6 seconds. The electric i7 Protection has a top speed of 160 km/h (99 mph) and a 0–100 km/h (62 mph) time of 9 seconds.

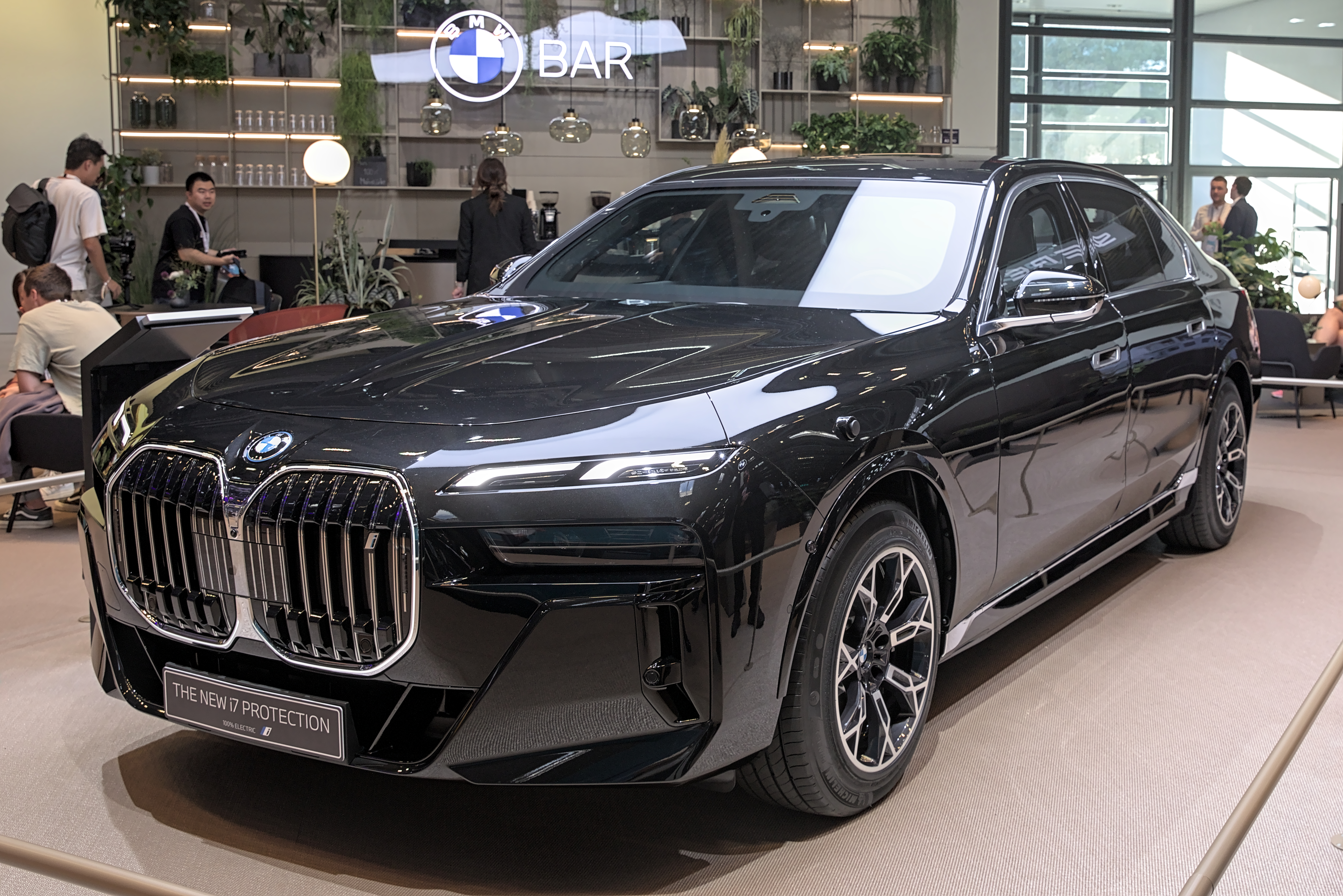
i7 Protection

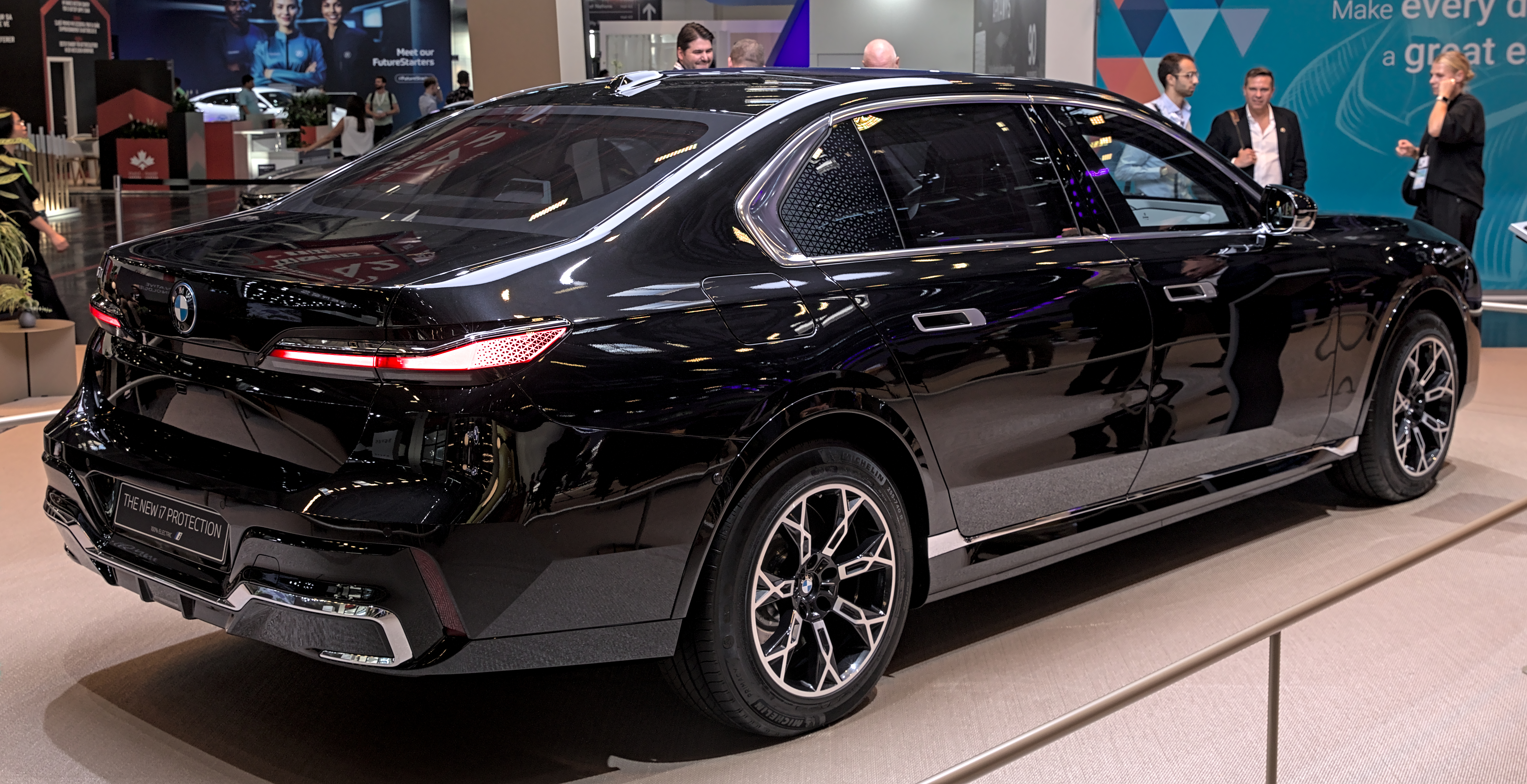
i7 Protection
