= BMW X5 (G05) =

Fourth generation of the BMW X5

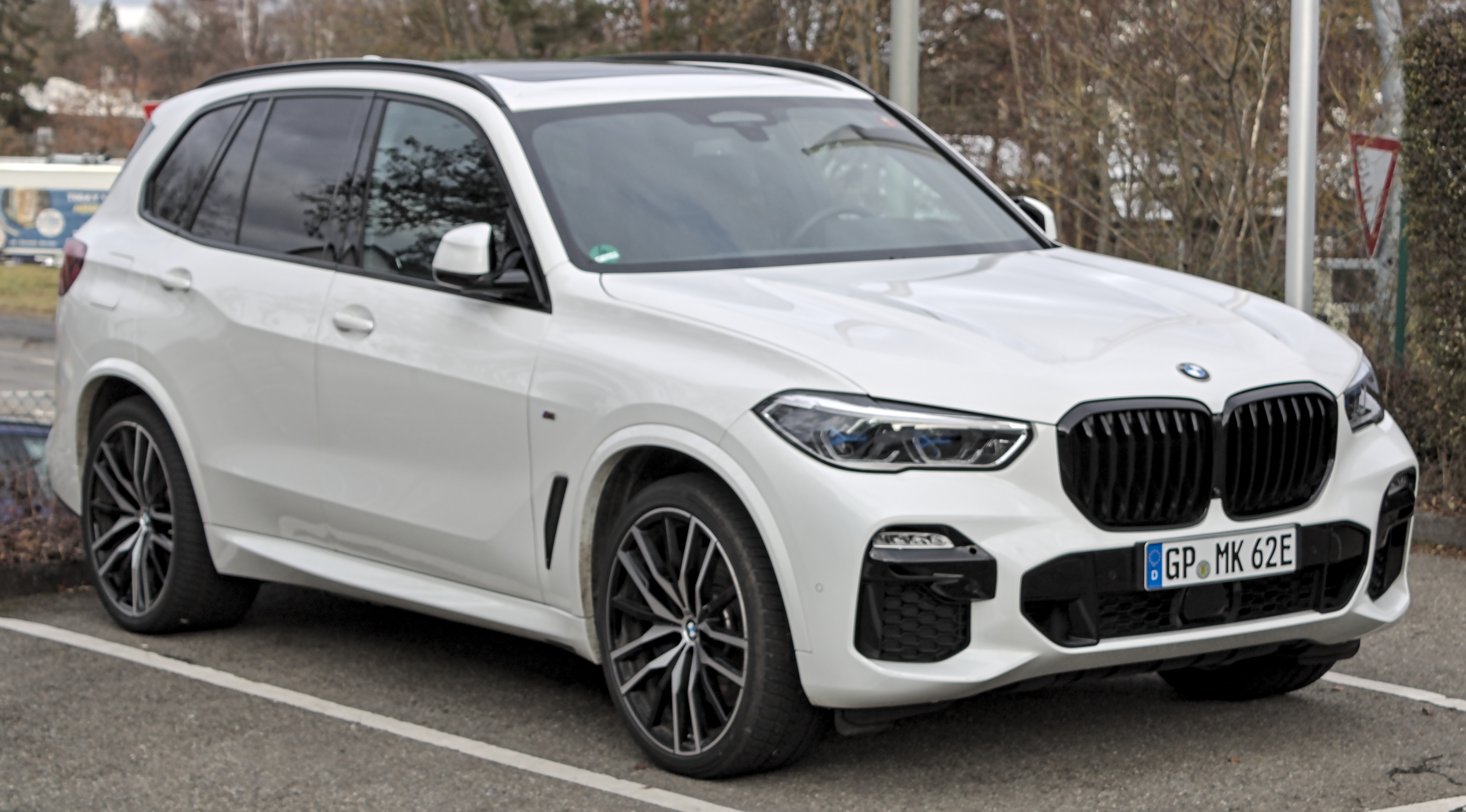

Overview
- Manufacturer: BMW
- Model code: G05; G18 (LWB); F95 (X5 M)
- Production: August 2018 – 2026
- Model years: 2019–2026
- Assembly: United States: Spartanburg County, South Carolina (BMW Plant Spartanburg); China: Dadong, Shenyang (BBA, LWB); Thailand: Rayong (BMW Manufacturing (Thailand)); Indonesia: Jakarta (Gaya Motor); India: Chennai (BMW India); Malaysia: Kulim (Inokom); Vietnam: Chu Lai (Truong Hai Group Corporation); Mexico: Toluca (VR6, armoured version); Egypt: Cairo (Global Auto Group)
- Designer: Anders Thøgersen (exterior); Eva Günther (interior)

Body and chassis
- Class: Mid-size luxury crossover SUV
- Body style: 5-door SUV
- Layout: Front-engine, all-wheel-drive (xDrive); Front-engine, rear-wheel-drive (sDrive) (North America only); Rear motor, rear-wheel drive (iX5)
- Platform: Cluster Architecture (CLAR)
- Related: BMW X6 (G06); BMW X7 (G07)

Powertrain
- Engine: Petrol: 2.0 L B48 turbo I4; 3.0 L B58 turbo I6; 4.4 L N63 twin-turbo V8 (2019–2023); 4.4 L S63 twin-turbo V8 (2019–2023); 4.4 L S68 twin-turbo V8 (since 2023); Petrol plug-in hybrid: 3.0 L B58 turbo I6; Diesel: 2.0 L B47 turbo I4; 3.0 L B57 turbo I6; 3.0 L B57 quad-turbo I6
- Electric motor: Fuel cell-powered (iX5)
- Transmission: 8-speed ZF 8HP automatic
- Battery: 9.1–24 kWh lithium-ion (PHEV); 2.5/2 (total/usable) kWh 400 V (iX5)

Dimensions
- Wheelbase: 2,975 mm (117.1 in); 3,105 mm (122.2 in) (LWB)
- Length: 4,935 mm (194.3 in); 5,060 mm (199.2 in) (LWB)
- Width: 2,004 mm (78.9 in)
- Height: 1,765 mm (69.5 in)
- Kerb weight: 2,060–2,286 kg (4,542–5,040 lb)

Chronology
- Predecessor: BMW X5 (F15)
- Successor: BMW X5 (G65)

The G05 BMW X5 is a mid-size luxury crossover SUV produced by German automaker BMW. It is the fourth generation of the BMW X5. It was launched in 2018 as the successor to the F15 X5. Sales of the X5 started in November 2018. The X5 M and X5 M Competition (F95) performance models were revealed on 1 October 2019.

== Development and launch ==
Information on the G05 X5 was released on 5 June 2018. The G05 X5 uses BMW's Cluster Architecture (CLAR) platform also found in the G11 7 Series and G30 5 Series. It features a five-link rear suspension and is also available with four-wheel steering or adjustable air suspension that can be raised or lowered by 40 mm (2 in). Compared to its predecessor, the G05 X5 is 36 mm (1.4 in) longer, 66 mm (2.6 in) wider, and 19 mm (0.7 in) shorter in height. All petrol models feature particulate filters while all diesel models feature AdBlue injection that reduces nitrogen oxide emissions.

Almost all regions feature xDrive all-wheel drive, but a rear-wheel drive sDrive model is available in the U.S. The xDrive50i model is available outside the European markets, while the European markets will get the M50i models. For the 2020 model year the M50i became available to the North American market in replacement to the xDrive50i model.

In August 2019, BMW revealed an armoured variant called X5 Protection VR6, which can withstand attacks from AK-47 bullets. This variant is equipped with the S63 4.4L V8 engine with a 48V mild hybrid system.

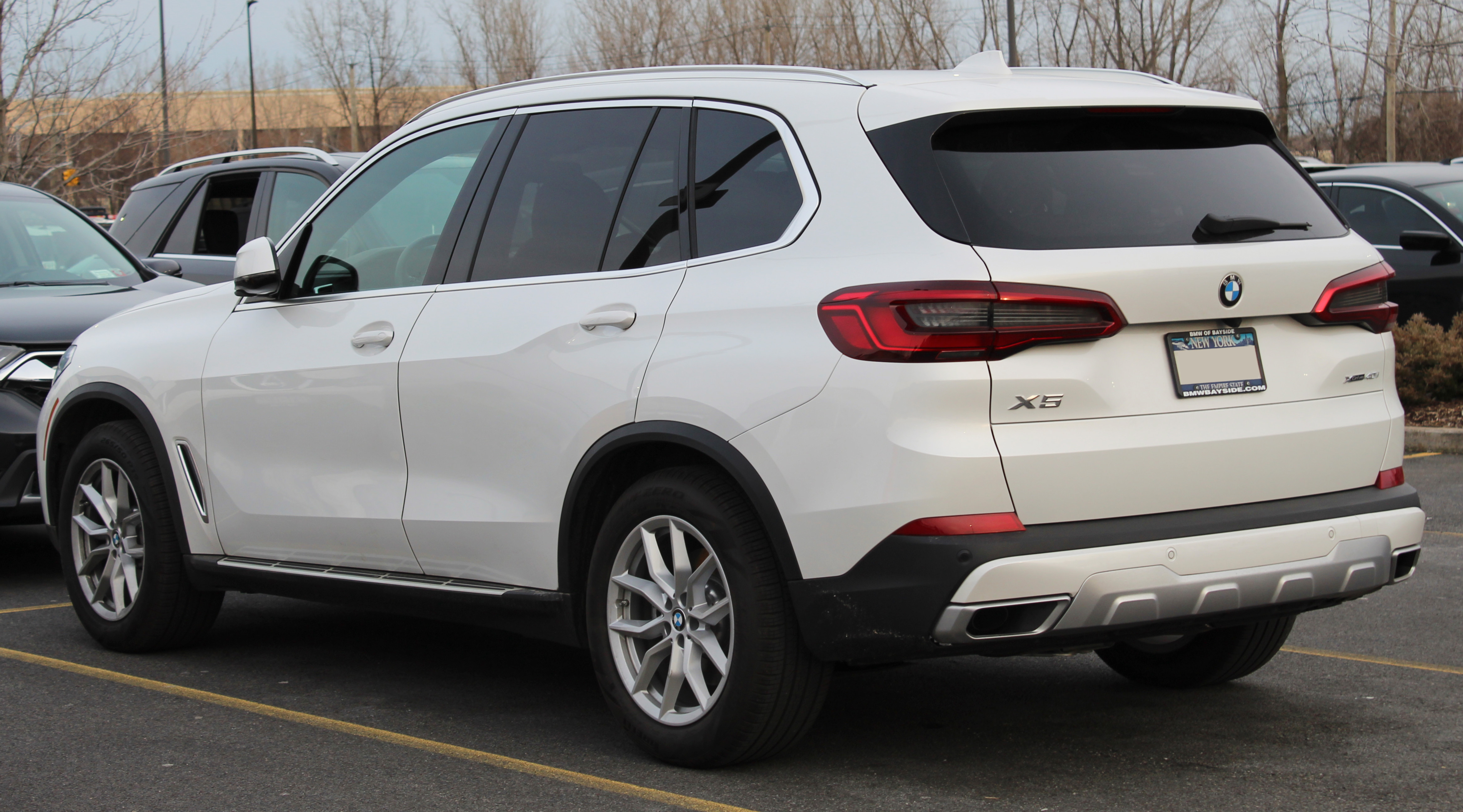
Rear view (pre-facelift)

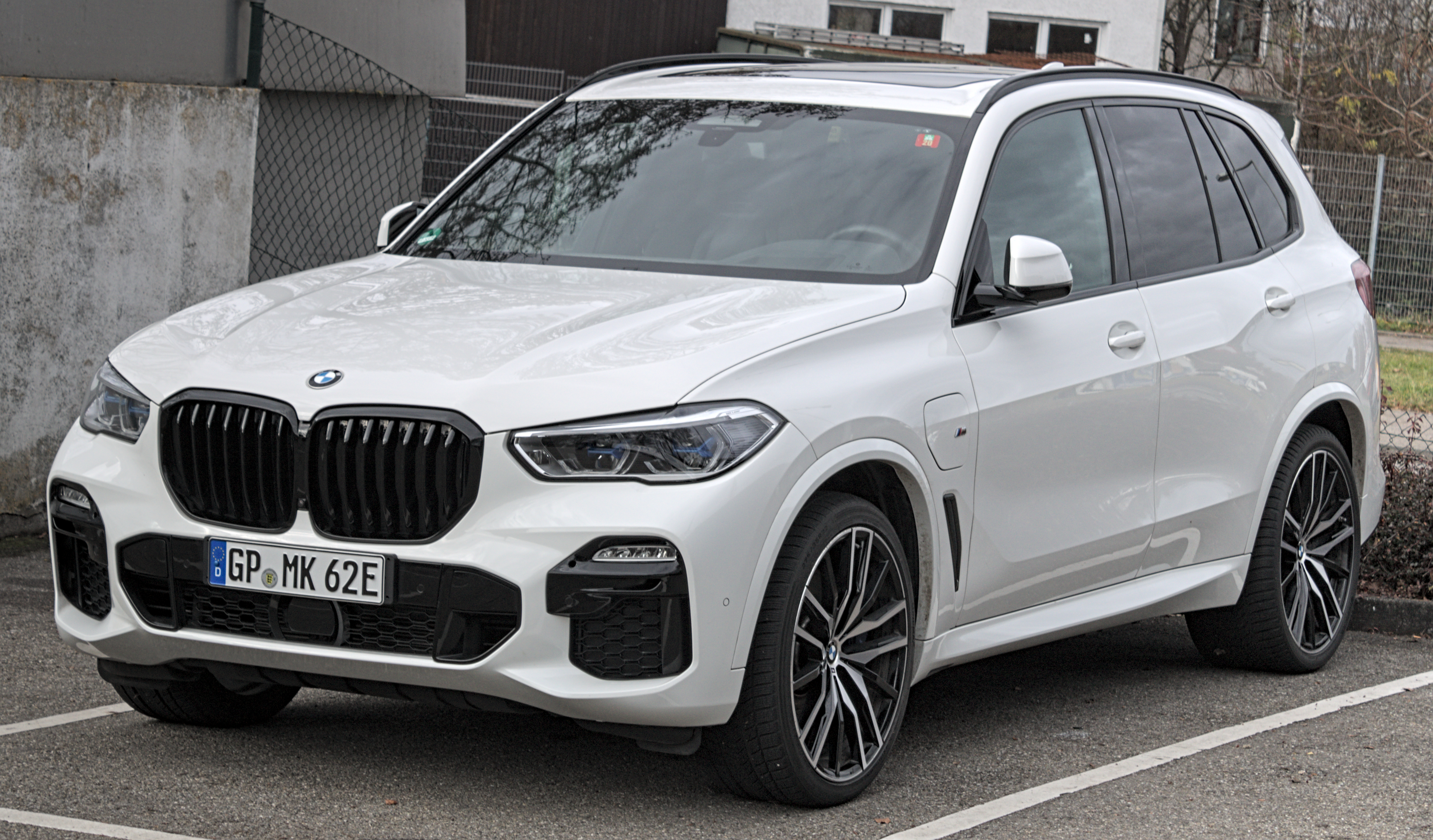
X5 M Sport (pre-facelift)

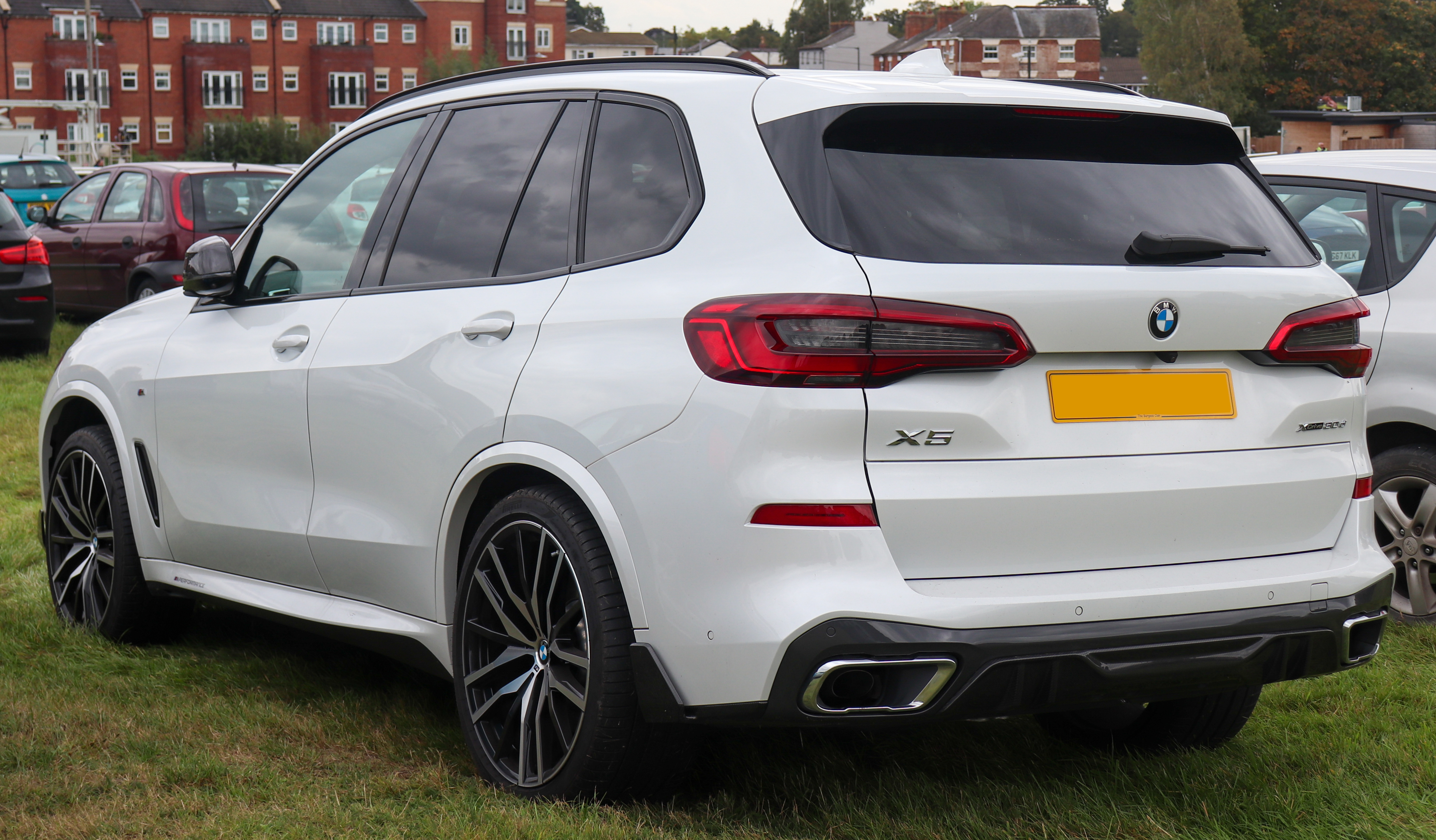
Rear view (M Sport; pre-facelift)

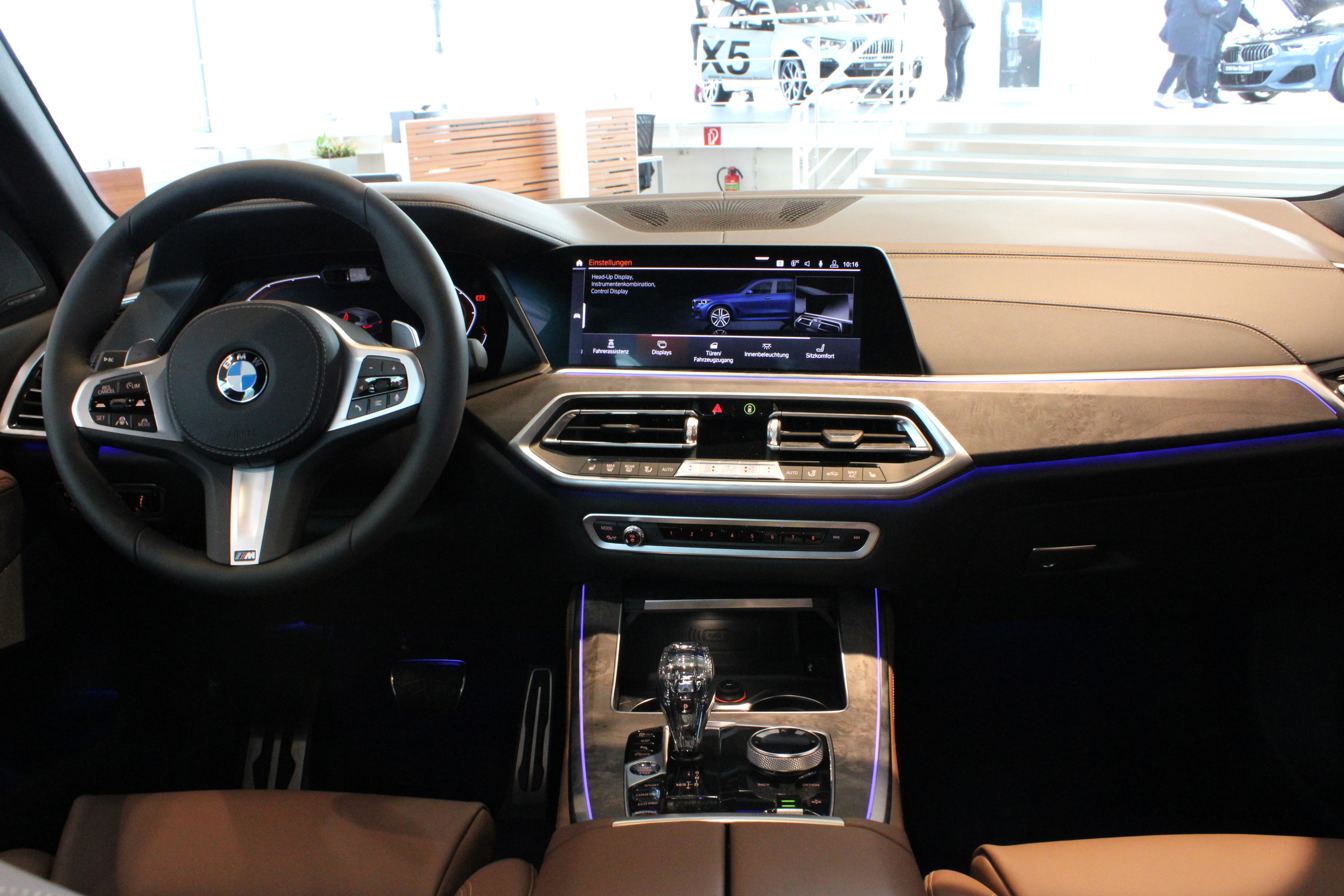
Interior (pre-facelift)

== Facelift ==
In March 2023 (for 2024), the X5 LCI entered production, adding a revised front grille and bumper, completely redesigned headlights and taillights, and new wheel designs. The X5 added a Highway Assistant driving assistant also present in the G70 7 Series.

The 2024 X5 xDrive50e now offers 483 hp (490 PS; 360 kW) and 40 miles (64 km) of fully-electric driving range, about 10 miles (16 km) and 94 hp (95 PS; 70 kW) more than the MY2023 pre-facelifted model.

The facelift also applies to the BMW X6.

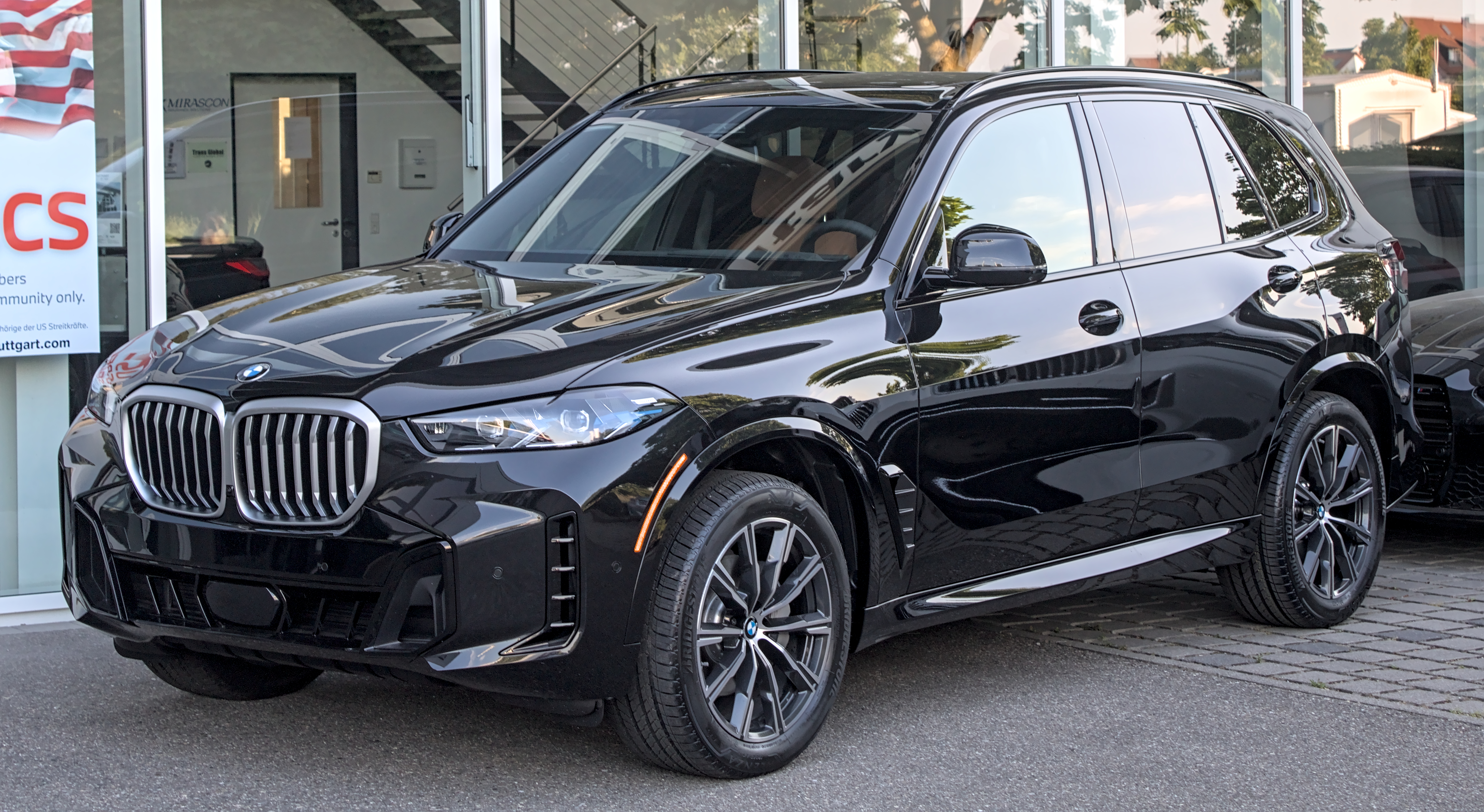
2024 model

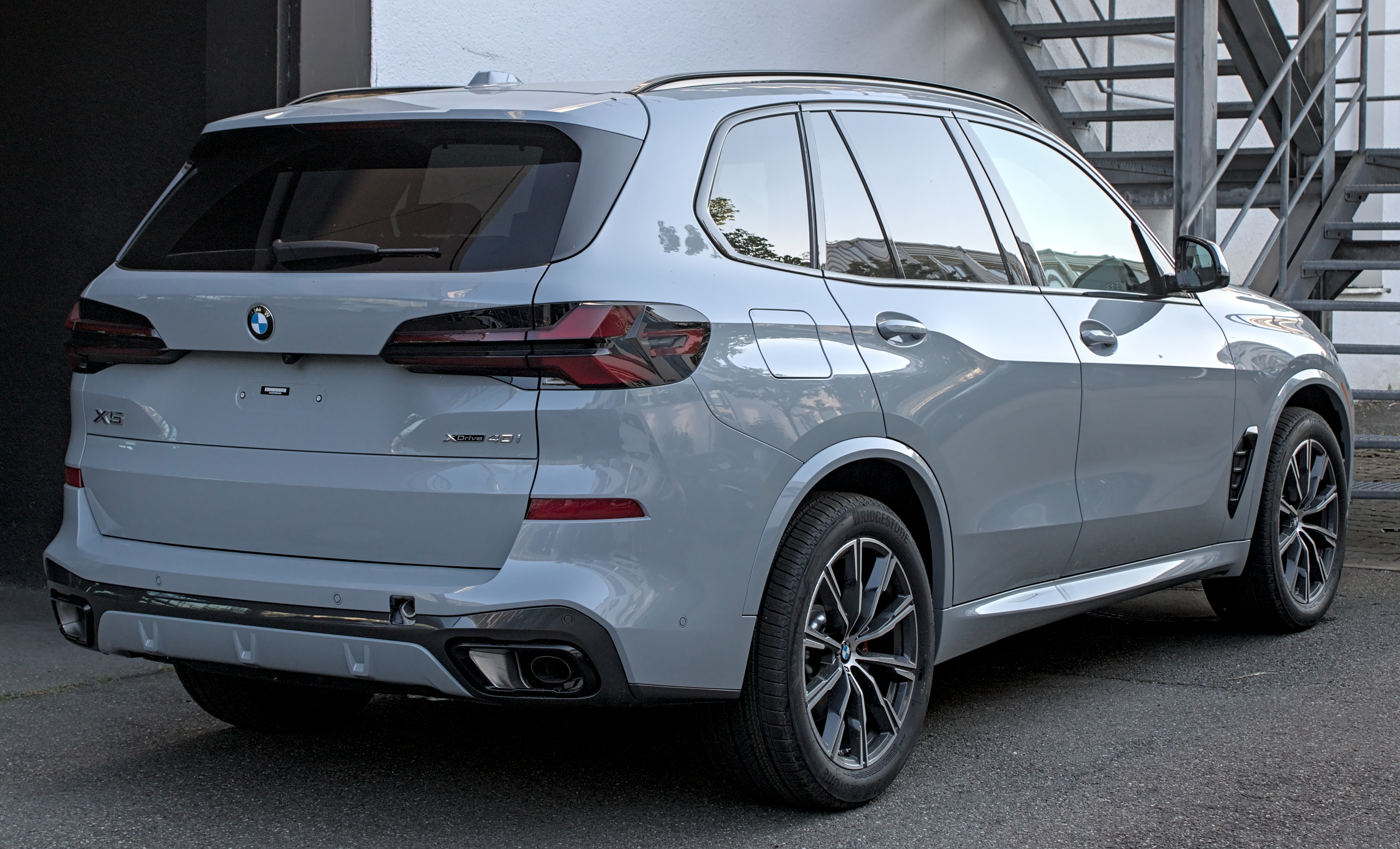
Rear view

== Models ==
=== X5 M (F95) ===
At the 2019 Los Angeles Auto Show, for the 2020 model year, BMW released the X5 M and X5 M Competition performance variants. Both models were initially powered by the 4.4 L S63 twin-turbo V8. The X5 M produced 592 hp (600 PS; 441 kW) and accelerates from 0–100 km/h (0–62 mph) in 3.9 seconds, while the Competition variant produced 616 hp (625 PS; 459 kW) and accelerates to 0–100 km/h (0–62 mph) in 3.8 seconds. Both models are an increase from the 567 hp (575 PS; 423 kW) produced by the previous F15 generation X5 M. In addition to the horsepower increase, major differences between the standard model and the Competition are an upgraded exhaust system, larger rear wheels and tires, Track mode, and improved standard leather upholstery.

Starting in 2024 with the LCI facelift, the base X5 M was discontinued while the X5 M Competition was updated to the 4.4L BMW S68 twin-turbo V8 MHEV, adding efficiency via an integrated 48-volt mild hybrid system.

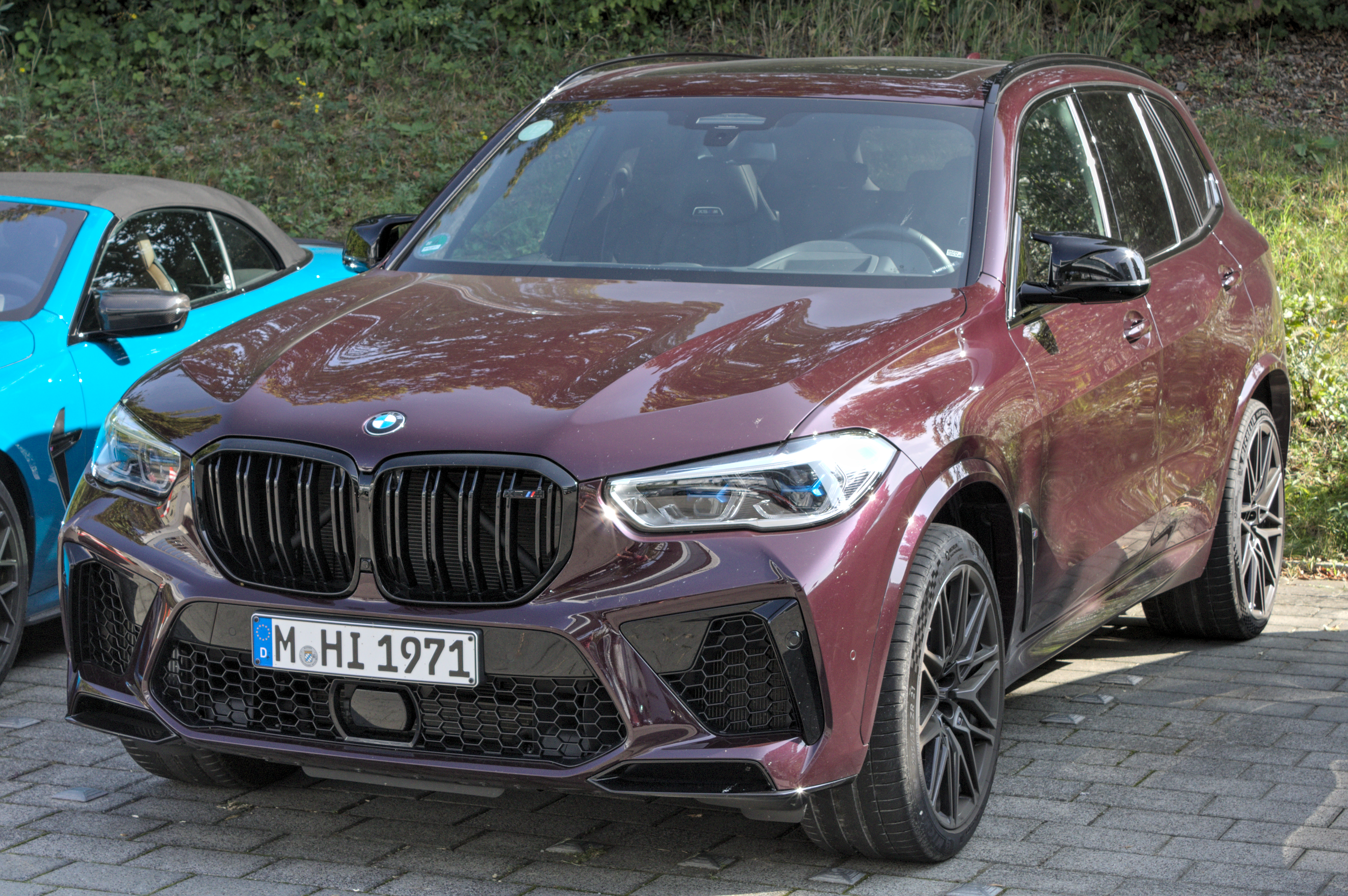
X5 M (pre-LCI)

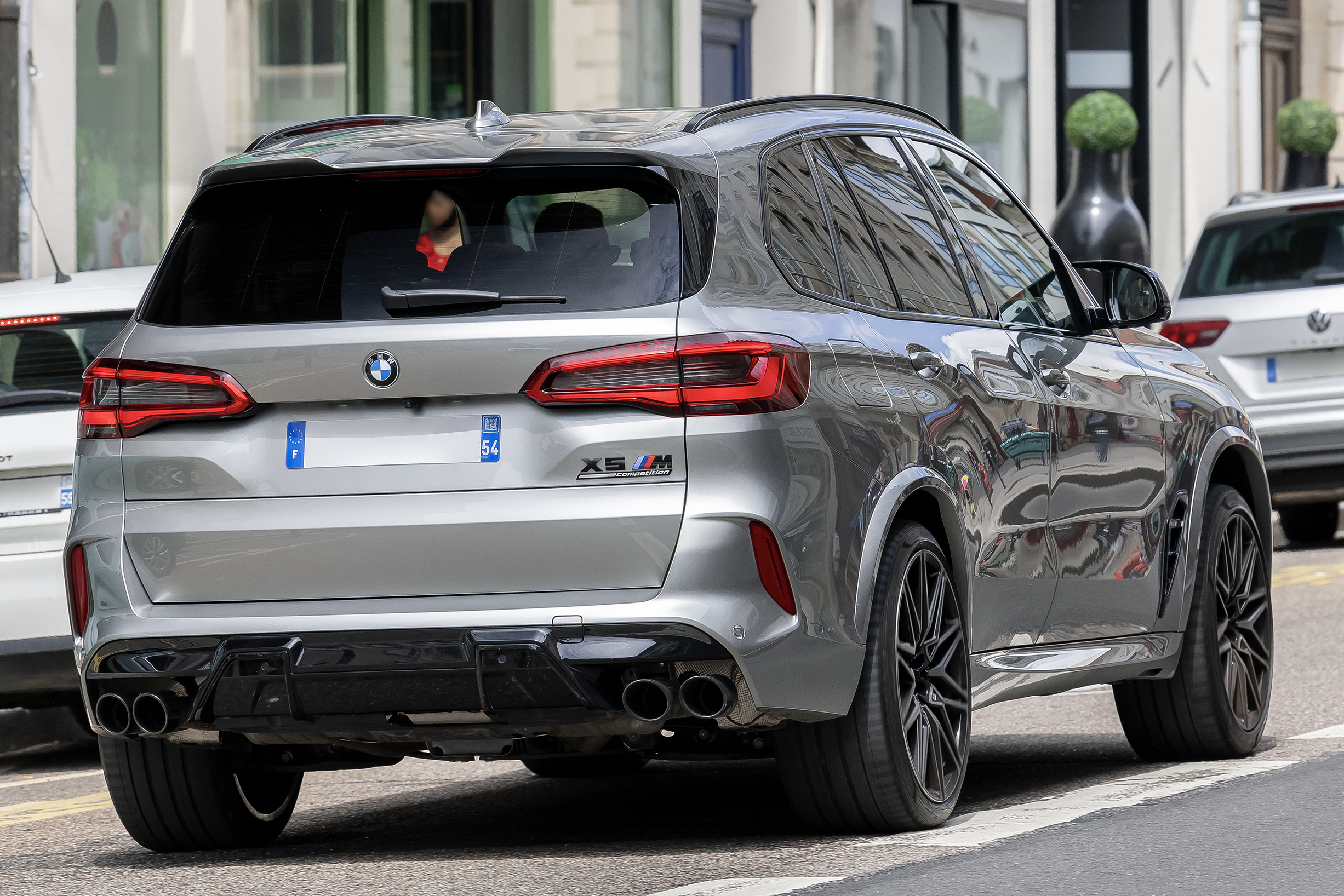
X5 M Competition (pre-LCI)

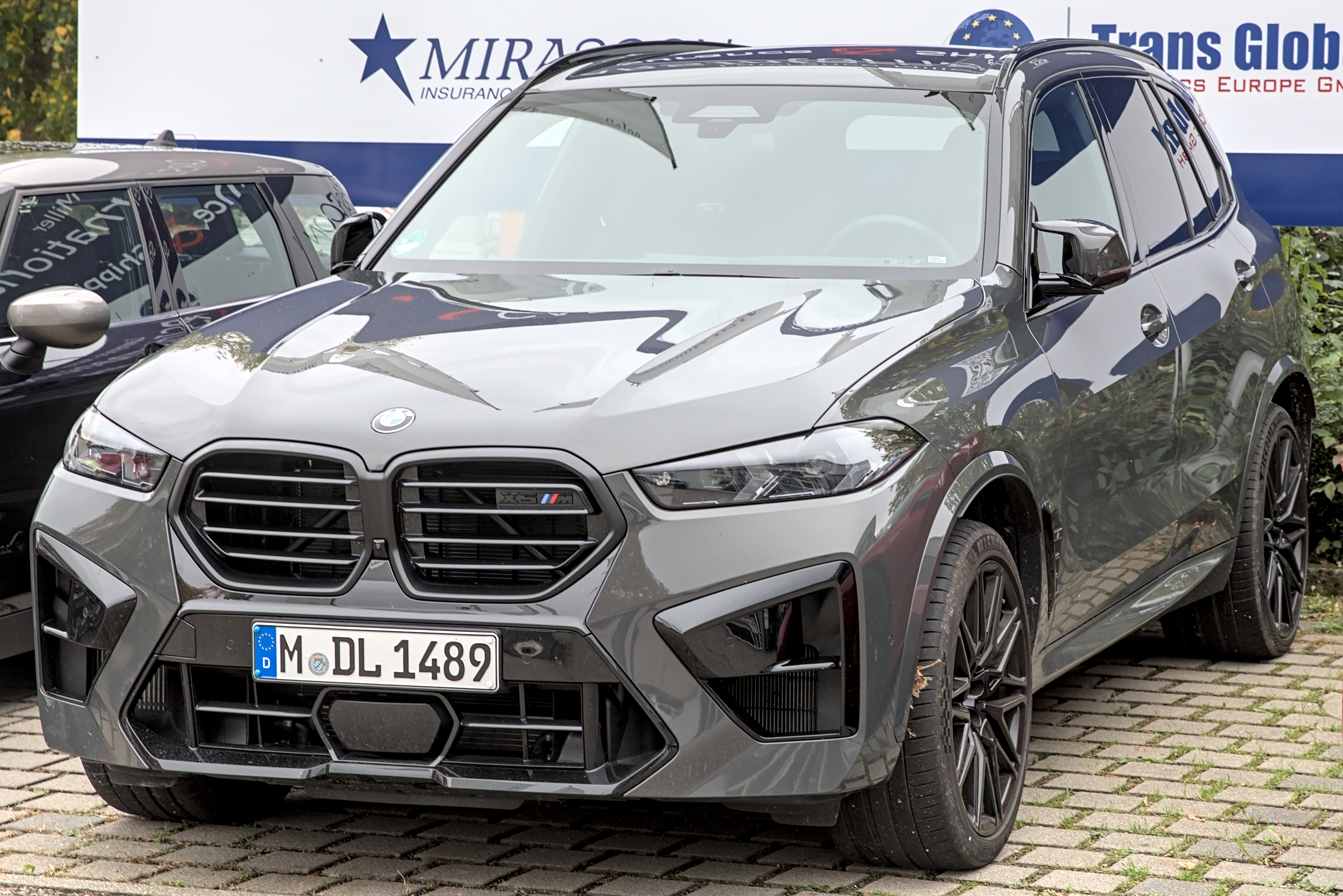
Facelift

=== X5 xDrive45e ===
Alongside the standard petrol variants, in 2019, BMW launched the xDrive45e plug-in hybrid variant of the X5. It was later introduced to the U.S. market in the summer of 2020. The xDrive 45e features a 24 kWh lithium-ion battery combined with a 3.0 L B58 turbo I6 and an electric motor that produces 113 hp (115 PS; 84 kW). In European models, 21.6 kWh of battery capacity was usable, while in the US that figure is only 17.06 kWh. The American model's range is 30 miles (48 km), as estimated by the EPA. The American-market car, including its batteries, are produced at BMW's plant in Spartanburg, South Carolina.

=== X5 LWB (G18) ===
BMW released the long-wheelbase version of the X5 in China, under the model code G18. It is marketed as the X5 xDrive30Li and xDrive40Li, and has been produced by the BMW Brilliance Automotive joint venture at the upgraded Shenyang, Dadong plant since April 2022. The G18's wheelbase is 130 mm (5.1 in) longer than the regular G05 to increase the rear passenger legroom. This is also reflected in the longer rear doors, which provide easier access to the second row of seats. Powertrains as standard consist of the 2 litre B48 turbocharged four cylinder and the 3 litre B58 turbocharged six cylinder plug-in hybrid engine for the xDrive30Li and xDrive40Li respectively.

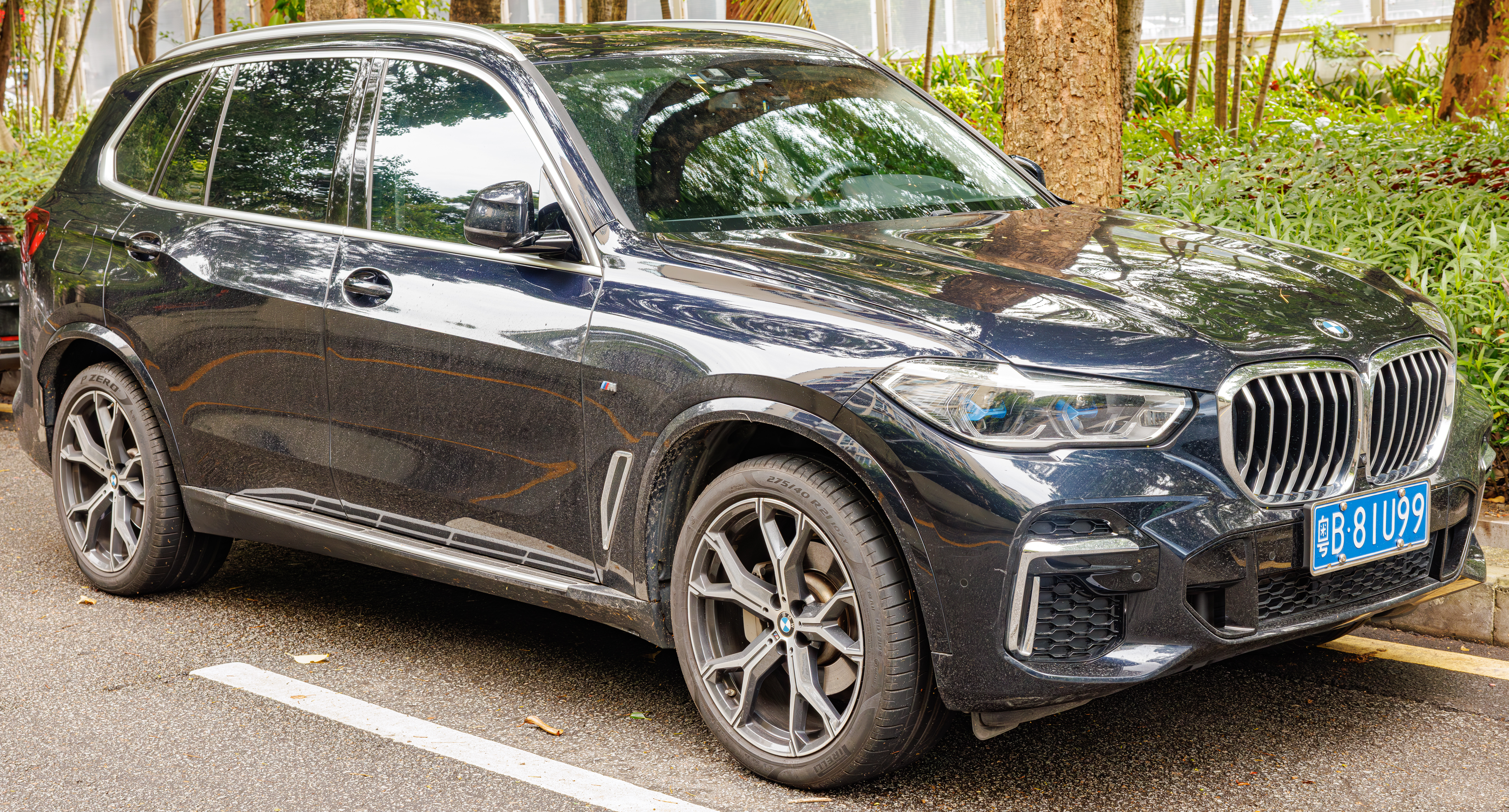
Pre-Facelift

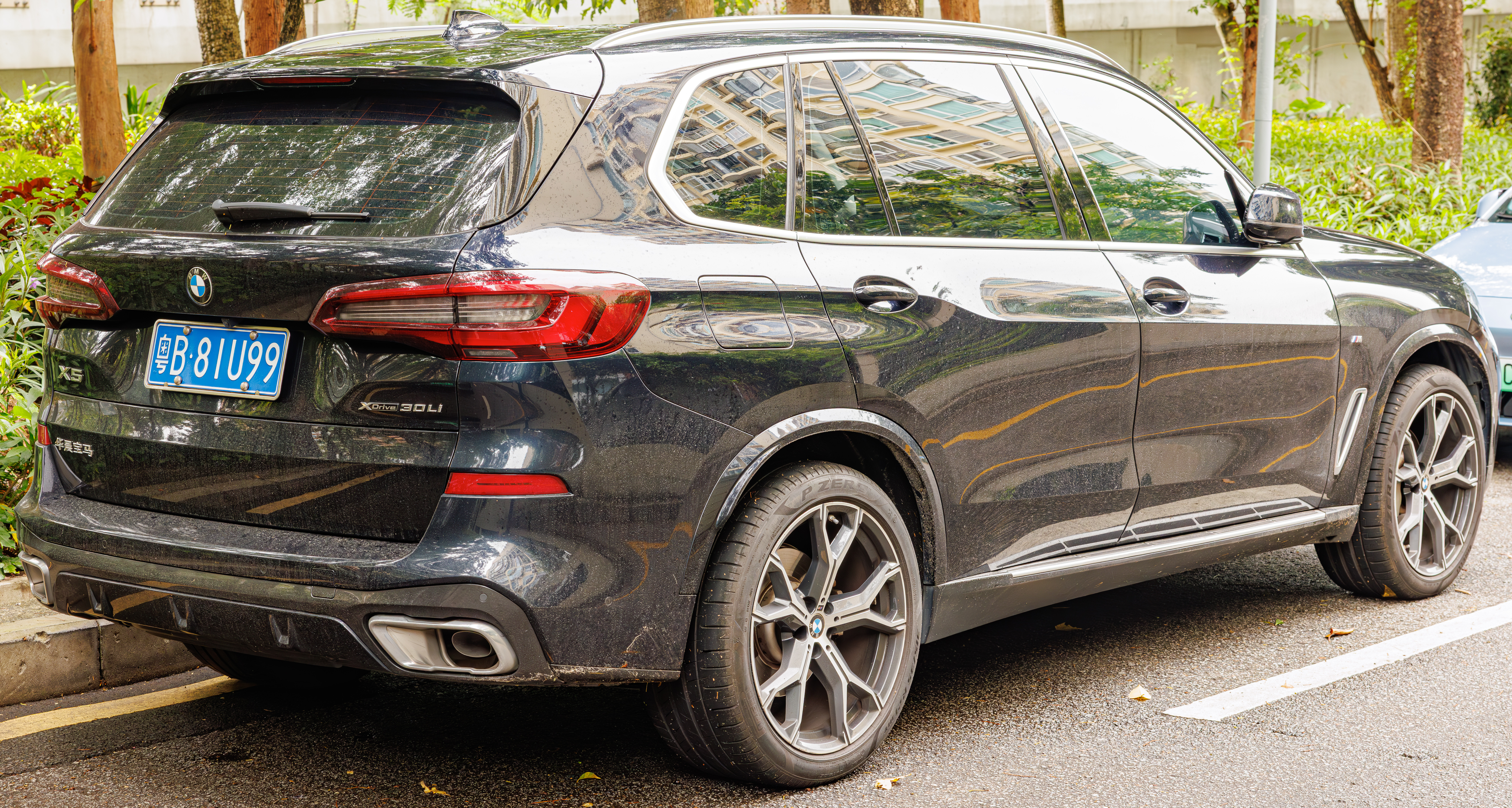
Pre-Facelift (rear view)

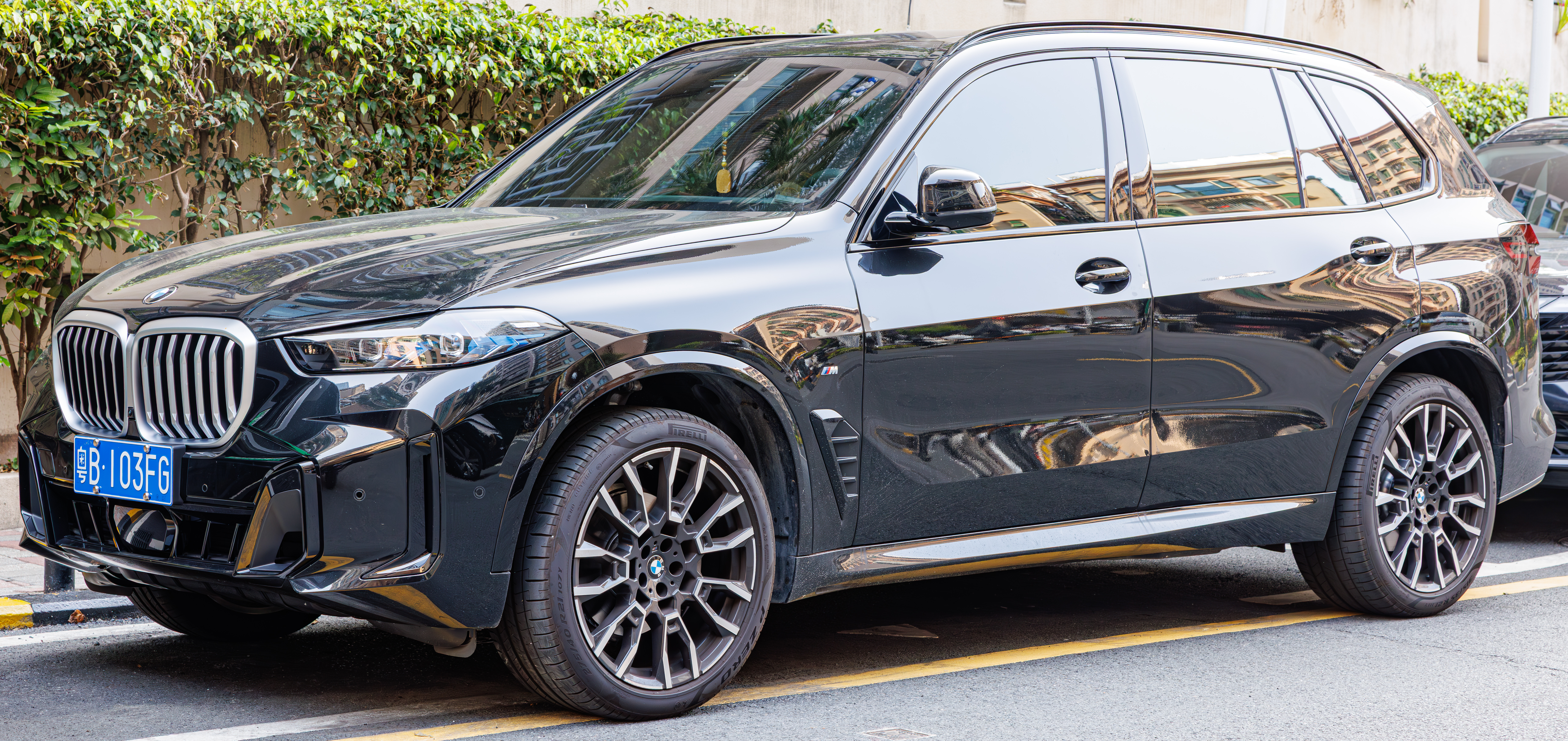
Facelift

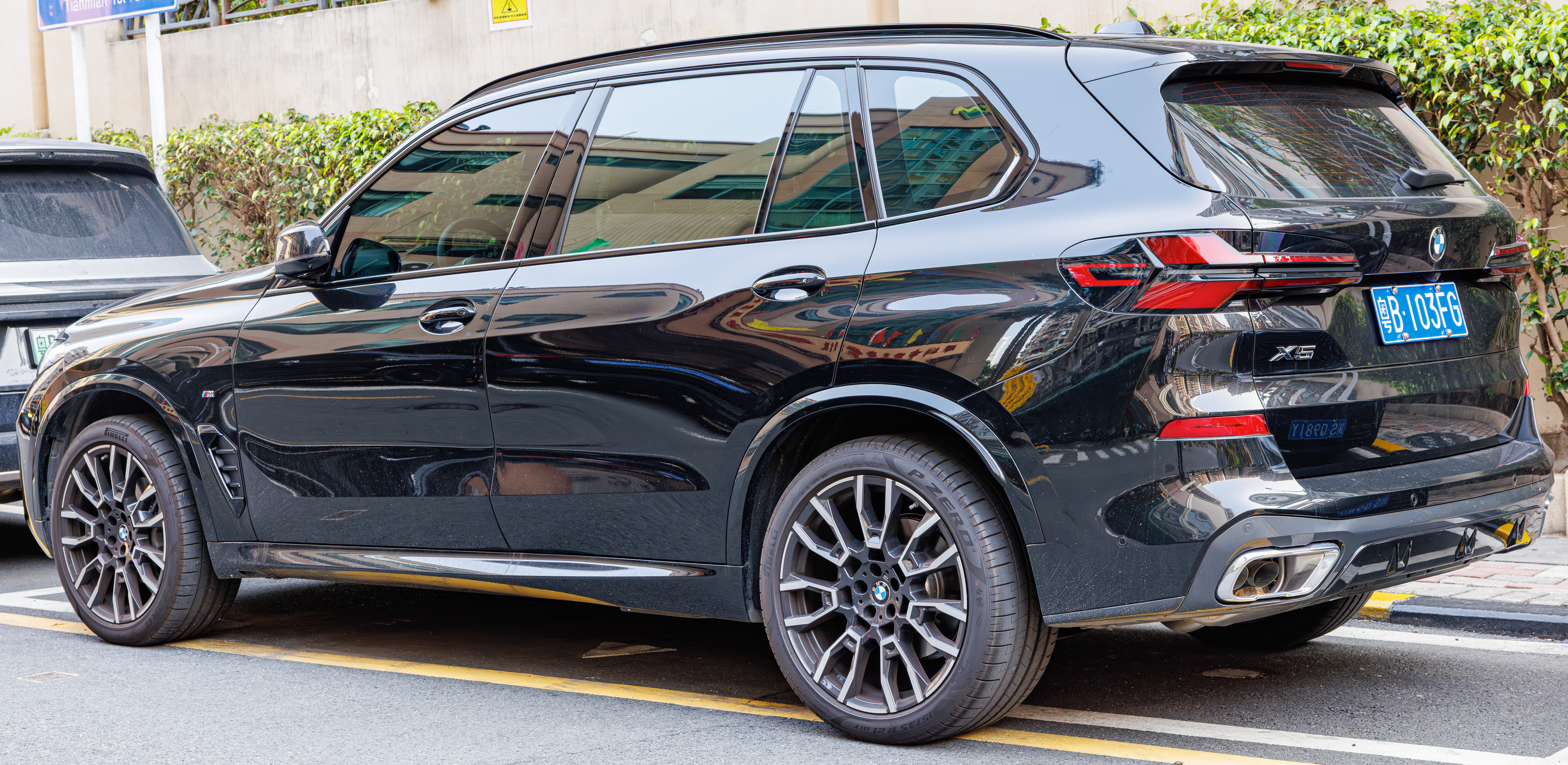
Facelift (rear view)

=== iX5 ===
The iX5 is a hydrogen powered fuel cell electric vehicle (FCEV) version of the X5 that was launched in February 2023 after being unveiled as a concept at the IAA show in 2019. BMW plans to produce a demonstration fleet of less than 100 vehicles. The iX5 has a maximum output of 295 kW (401 hp) and accelerates from 0–100 km/h (0–62 mph) in less than 6 seconds with a range of more than 504 kilometres (313 miles) from its two high-pressure fuel tanks. BMW sources the fuel cells from Toyota.

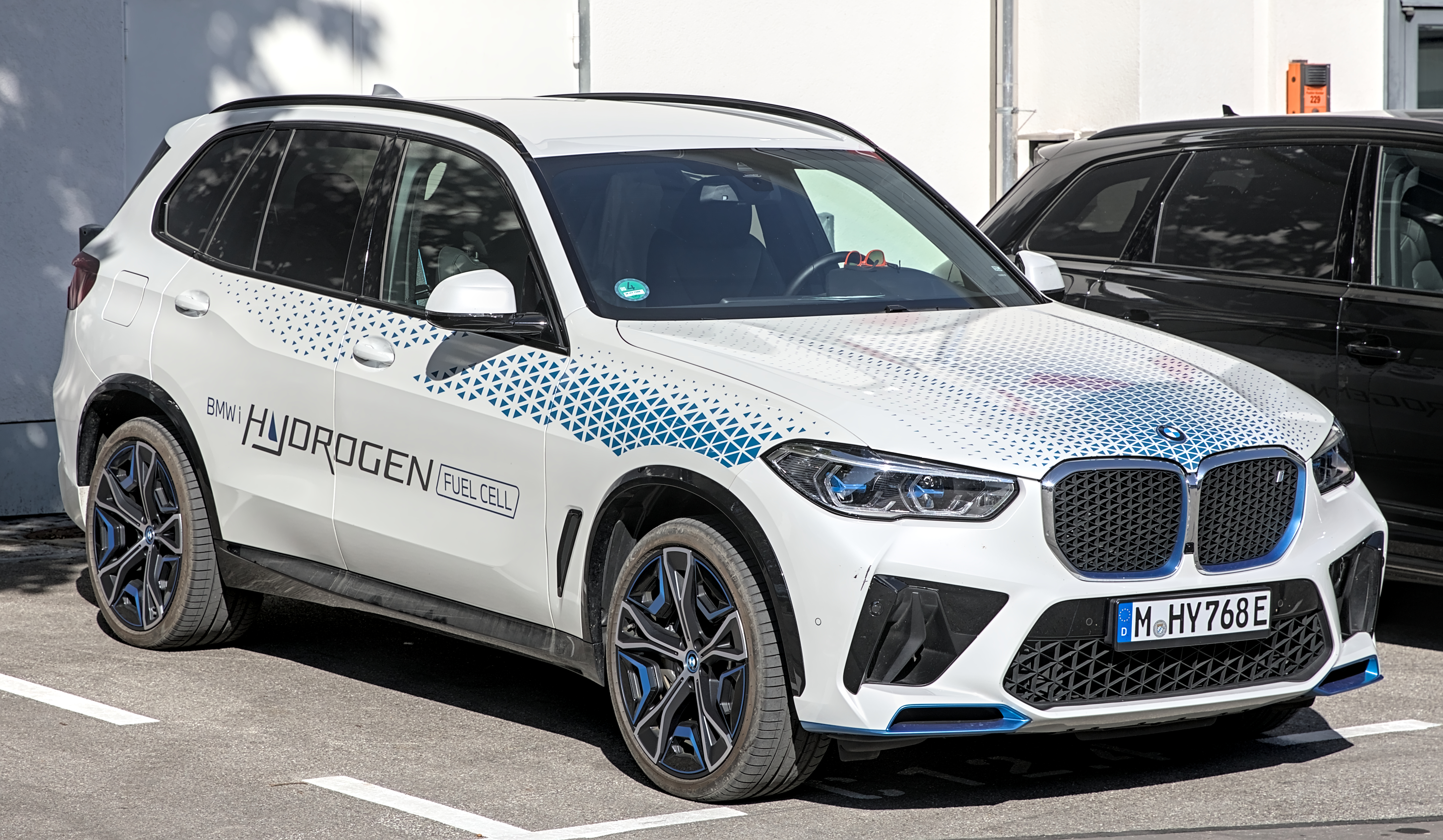
iX5

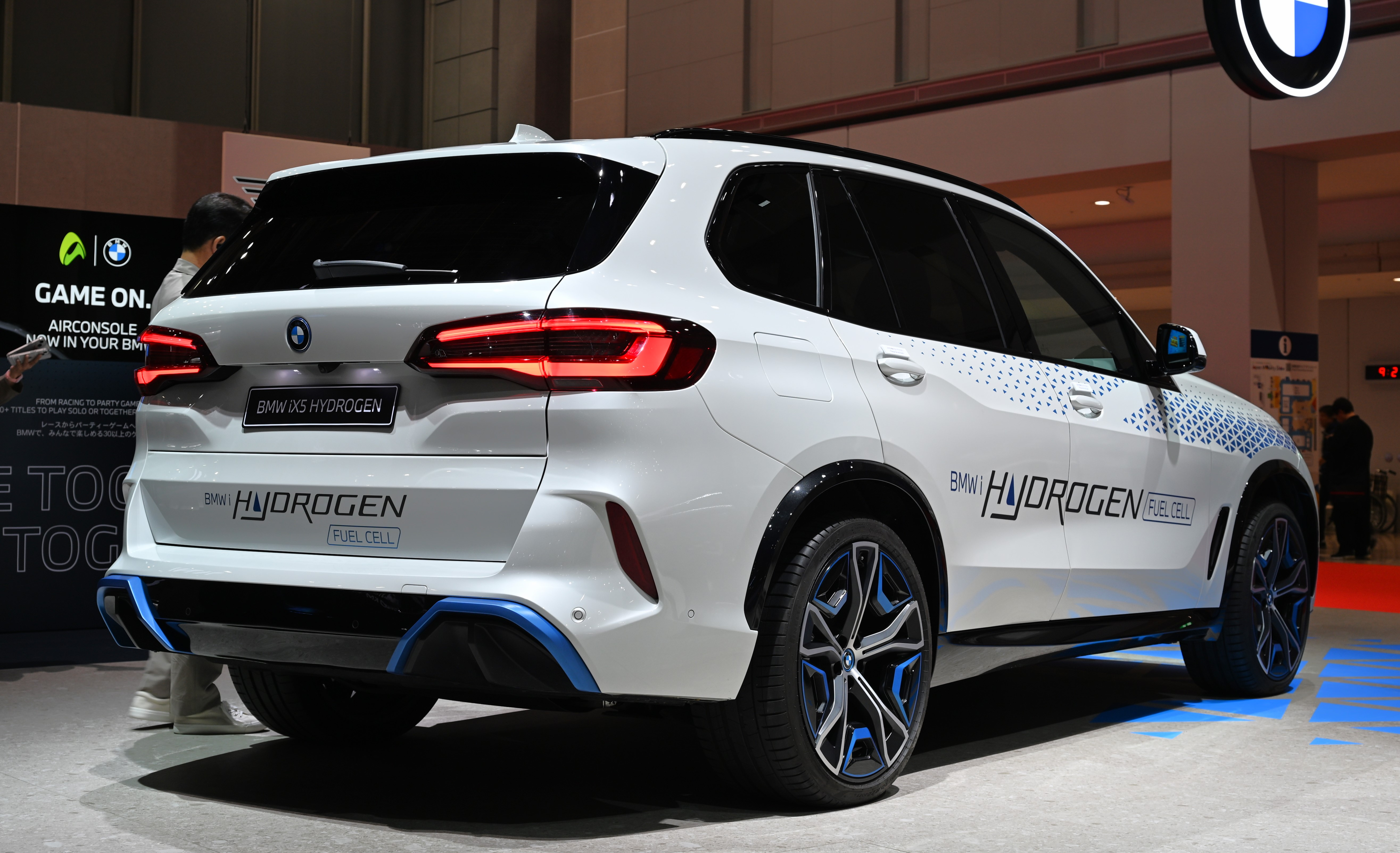
rear view

== Equipment ==
Standard equipment includes LED headlights, electronically controlled dampers, electric and heated sports seats, and two 12.3-inch displays for the instrument panel and iDrive system. G05 X5 models are also available with laser headlights, heated and cooled cupholders, a panoramic sunroof with LED patterns, and a Microsoft Office 365 and Skype for Business subscription with over-the-air updates. A new Digital Key system also enables a smartphone to be used as a key fob to lock or unlock the car via NFC.

xLine and M Sport packages are also offered alongside the standard trim and feature different body styling and exclusive exterior paint colours and upholstery choices. xLine models feature 19-inch alloy wheels with aluminium exterior trim, while M Sport models feature 20-inch alloy wheels with high-gloss trim.

This generation of X5 uses BMW iDrive 7.0 infotainment system, replacing iDrive 6.0 system in the previous generation. The iDrive 7.0 system now included standard wireless Apple CarPlay and Android Auto smartphone integration, which was previously optional with the iDrive 6.0 system (the iDrive 6.0 system did not offer Android Auto). The iDrive 7.0 system also integrates the BMW Assistant feature, with hands-free voice activation via the phrase, "Hey BMW".

M Performance Parts can be fitted to 25-45 models with the M Sport trim and all M50 models. These include M rims, a rear carbon fibre winglet, side skirts, carbon fibre mirrors, a front carbon fibre winglet, a sport steering wheel and carbon fibre diffuser.

The X5 M has its own M Performance Parts. These include a sport steering wheel, roof spoiler extension and carbon fibre kidney grilles.

In 2020, a Mild Hybrid option was added to the xDrive40d diesel engine.

== Engine options ==
=== Petrol engines ===
Model	Years	Engine- turbo	Power	Torque	0–100 km/h (0–62 mph)
X5 xDrive30Li	2019–	2.0 L B48 straight-4	195 kW (261 hp) at 5,000–6,000 rpm	400 N⋅m (295 lb⋅ft) at 1,550–4,500 rpm	6.9 s
X5 sDrive40i	2019–	3.0 L B58 straight-6	250 kW (335 hp) at 5,500–6,500 rpm	450 N⋅m (332 lb⋅ft) at 1,500–5,200 rpm	5.2 s
X5 xDrive40i	2018–2020	3.0 L B58 straight-6	250 kW (335 hp) at 5,500–6,500 rpm	450 N⋅m (332 lb⋅ft) at 1,500–5,200 rpm	5.5 s
X5 xDrive40i	2021–2023	3.0 L B58 straight-6	245 kW (329 hp) at 5,500–6,250 rpm	450 N⋅m (332 lb⋅ft) at 1,600–4,800 rpm	5.7 s
X5 xDrive40i	2023-	3.0 L B58 straight-6	280 kW (375 hp) at 5,200–6,250 rpm	520 Nm (384 Ib ft) at 1,850–5000 rpm	5.4 s
X5 xDrive45e	2019–2023	3.0 L B58 straight-6 + electric motor	290 kW (389 hp) at 5,500 rpm	600 N⋅m (443 lb⋅ft) at 1,500–5,200 rpm	5.6 s
X5 xDrive50e	2023–	3.0 L B58 straight-6 + electric motor	360 kW (483 hp) at 5,500 rpm	700 N⋅m (516 lb⋅ft) at 1,500–5,200 rpm	4.8 s
X5 xDrive50i	2018–2020	4.4 L N63 V8	340 kW (456 hp) at 5,250 rpm	650 N⋅m (479 lb⋅ft) at 1,500–4,750 rpm	4.7 s
X5 M50i	2020–2023	4.4 L N63 V8	390 kW (523 hp) at 5,500–6,000 rpm	750 N⋅m (553 lb⋅ft) at 1,800–4,600 rpm	4.3 s
X5 M60i	2023–	4.4 L S68 MHEV V8	390 kW (523 hp) at 5,500–6,000 rpm	750 N⋅m (553 lb⋅ft) at 1,800–4,600 rpm	4.3 s
X5 M	2020–2023	4.4 L S63 V8	441 kW (591 hp) at 6,000 rpm	750 N⋅m (553 lb⋅ft) at 1,800–5,860 rpm	4.0 s
X5 M Competition	2020–2023	4.4 L S63 V8	460 kW (617 hp) at 6,000 rpm	750 N⋅m (553 lb⋅ft) at 1,800–5,860 rpm	3.8 s
X5 M Competition	2024–	4.4 L S68 MHEV V8	460 kW (617 hp) at 6,000 rpm	750 N⋅m (553 lb⋅ft) at 1,800–5,860 rpm	3.9 s

=== Diesel engines ===
Model	Years	Engine- turbo	Power	Torque	0–100 km/h (0–62 mph)
X5 xDrive25d	2018–2023	2.0 L B47 straight-4	170 kW (228 hp)	450 N⋅m (332 lb⋅ft) at 1500-3000 rpm.	7.5 s
X5 xDrive30d	2018–2026	3.0 L B57 straight-6	195 kW (261 hp) at 4,000 rpm	620 N⋅m (457 lb⋅ft) at 2,000–2,500 rpm	6.5 s
X5 xDrive40d	2018–2026	3.0 L B57 straight-6	250 kW (335 hp) at 4,400 rpm	700 N⋅m (516 lb⋅ft) at 1750–2,250 rpm	5.5 s
X5 M50d	2018–2020	3.0 L B57 straight-6	294 kW (394 hp) at 4,400 rpm	760 N⋅m (561 lb⋅ft) at 2,000–3,000 rpm	5.2 s

=== Fuel cell ===
Model	Years	Engine	Power	Torque	0–100 km/h (0–62 mph)
iX5	2023–	Hydrogen Fuel Cell	295 kW (401 hp) (170 kW from battery; 125 kW from Fuel Cell)	720 N⋅m (531 lb⋅ft)	Under 6 seconds

== Safety ==
ANCAP test results* BMW X5 3.0L diesel & petrol variants only (2018, aligned with Euro NCAP)
Test	Points	%
Overall:	5 /5 stars	
Adult occupant:	34.1	89%
Child occupant:	42.9	87%
Pedestrian:	36.2	75%
Safety assist:	9.2	71%

The 2018 X5 received five stars overall in its Euro NCAP test.

Euro NCAP test results* BMW X5 xDrive30d, LHD (2018)
Test	Points	%
Overall:	5 /5 stars	
Adult occupant:	34.1	89%
Child occupant:	42.6	87%
Pedestrian:	36.2	75%
Safety assist:	9.8	75%

== Production ==
In March 2025, Avtotor resumed assembly of the X5, X6, and X7 models using remaining component kits left over after BMW terminated its partnership with the company in 2022 following Russia's invasion of Ukraine. BMW stated that it was not involved in the production, explaining that Avtotor was assembling limited batches of vehicles from "old, partially outdated kits" that had remained in its possession after the partnership ended, with production taking place on an irregular basis.

Avtotor sold a total of 145 vehicles in 2025. Although these vehicles were registered as 2025 and 2026 model-year vehicles, they retained the exterior design of the pre-facelift 2022 models. As supplies of imported components diminished, assembly increasingly incorporated locally sourced parts, including wiring harnesses, hoses, rubber components, and painted body panels.
