= BMW XM =

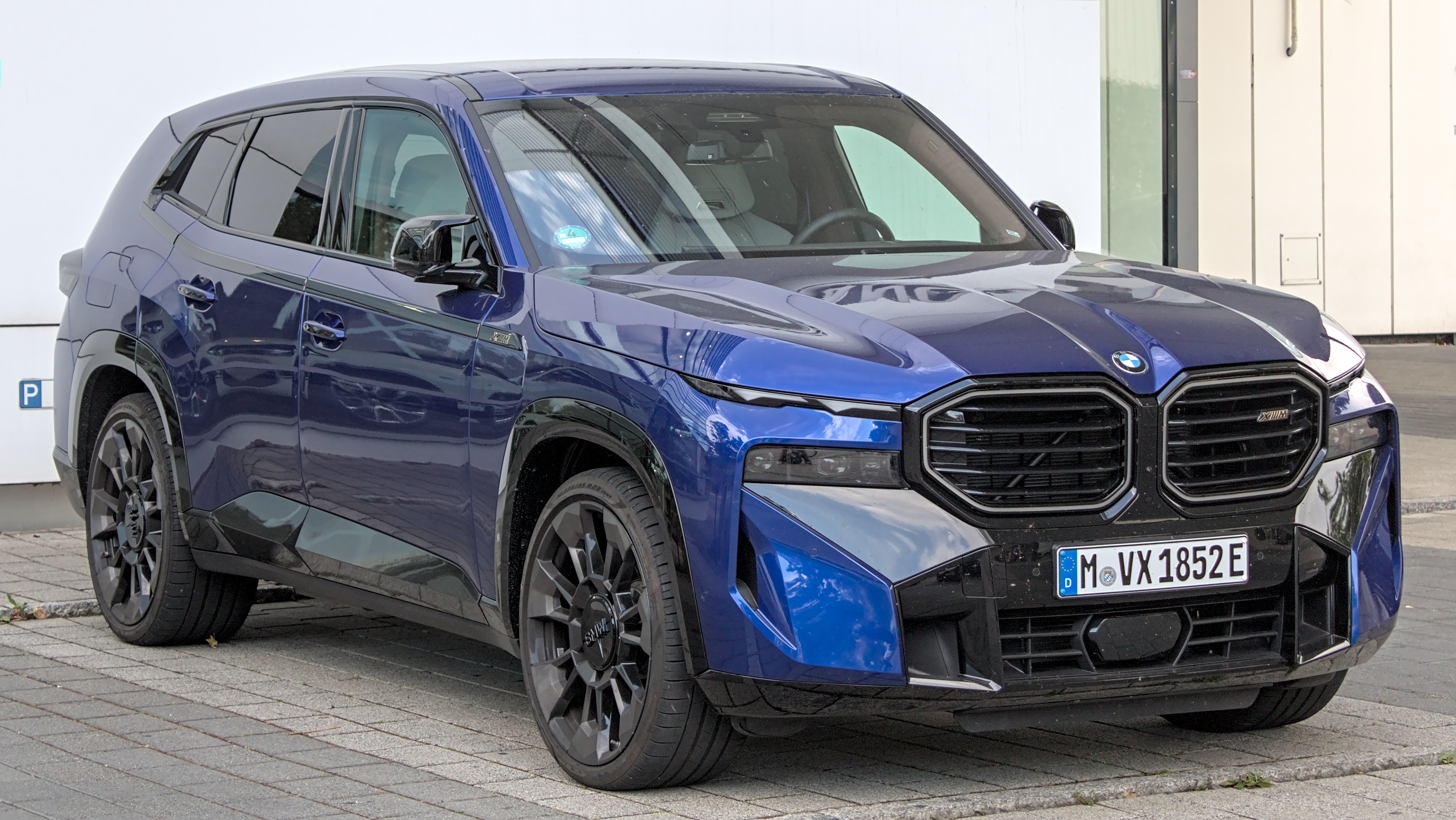

Overview
- Manufacturer: BMW M
- Model code: G09
- Production: December 2022 – present
- Assembly: United States: Greer, South Carolina (Plant Spartanburg)
- Designer: Marcus Syring, Hussein Al-Attar; Boson Huang (exterior); Chris Lee (interior)

Body and chassis
- Class: Full-size luxury crossover SUV
- Body style: 5-door crossover SUV
- Layout: Front-engine, all-wheel drive (M xDrive)
- Platform: Cluster Architecture (CLAR)
- Related: BMW X7; BMW M8

Powertrain
- Engine: Petrol plug-in hybrid: 3.0 L B58 turbocharged I6; 4.4 L S68 twin-turbocharged V8
- Electric motor: Permanent magnet synchronous motor
- Power output: 350 kW (476 PS; 469 hp) (XM 50e, combined); 480 kW (653 PS; 644 hp) (XM, combined); 550 kW (748 PS; 738 hp) (XM Label Red, combined)
- Transmission: 8-speed ZF 8HP automatic
- Hybrid drivetrain: Plug-in hybrid
- Battery: 29.5 kWh (gross), 25.7 kWh (net/usable) lithium-ion
- Electric range: 82–88 km (51–55 mi) (Europe, WLTP)
- Plug-in charging: 7.4 kW (AC)

Dimensions
- Wheelbase: 3,105 mm (122.2 in)
- Length: 5,110 mm (201.2 in)
- Width: 2,005 mm (78.9 in)
- Height: 1,755 mm (69.1 in)
- Curb weight: 2,749 kg (6,061 lb)

The BMW XM is a full-size automobile manufactured by German marque BMW since 2022. It is a crossover SUV with a plug-in hybrid electric drivetrain, and is the second car developed entirely by BMW M, after the BMW M1 in 1978.

Three versions are currently available, the entry level "XM 50e" with the B58 3-liter inline 6-cylinder petrol engine, the base "XM" with the S68 4.4-liter V8 petrol engine, and the "XM Label" with the same S68 petrol engine as the "XM" but tuned to produce more power and torque figures. There is also the "XM Label Red" version which is physically and mechanically identical to the "XM Label", but with a limited production run of 500 units. All three versions have the same 8-speed M Steptronic automatic transmission and integrated electric motor.

== Overview ==
=== Launch and development ===
BMW was Art Basel's official partner for event's 2021 edition, where on 29 November BMW unveiled the concept version of the XM at Miami Beach, Florida. Production of the XM started in December 2022 at the BMW US Manufacturing Company plant in Greer, South Carolina, with deliveries commencing in 2023.

BMW also entered a gentlemen's agreement with French carmaker Citroën in order to be able to use the name "XM" for its vehicle, since Citroën originally used it for their XM executive car.

== Specifications ==
Along with its 4.4 L (268.5 cu in) V8, the BMW XM uses an electric motor integrated into the eight-speed automatic gearbox that produces 145 kW (197 PS; 194 hp) and 281 N⋅m (207 lb⋅ft) BMW mentioned that this system is also used in their BMW M Hybrid V8 LMDh car.

The electric motor is powered by a 25.7 kWh (92.5 MJ) battery, which has an estimated range of 48 km (30 mi) (US EPA) / 88 km (55 mi) (WLTP), and has regenerative braking recharging abilities. The electric battery, charging at its maximum of 7.4 kW, can charge from 0-100% in 4.25 hours. The towing capacity is 2,700 kg (6,000 lb) for braked trailers, and 750 kg (1,650 lb) for unbraked trailers.

The XM has permanent four-wheel drive with a rear-wheel drive bias, a bespoke M Sport differential situated at the rear axle allowing for torque vectoring. The XM's handling is controlled by 48-volt electrical active anti-roll bars along with steel springs, adaptive M dampers and active steering.

Power is sent via an 8-speed M Steptronic automatic transmission to the 23" wheels which are fitted with 275/35R23 tires at the front and 315/30R23 at the rear. The XM uses six-piston fixed-caliper brakes in the front, and single-piston floating-caliper brakes in the rear.

=== XM ===
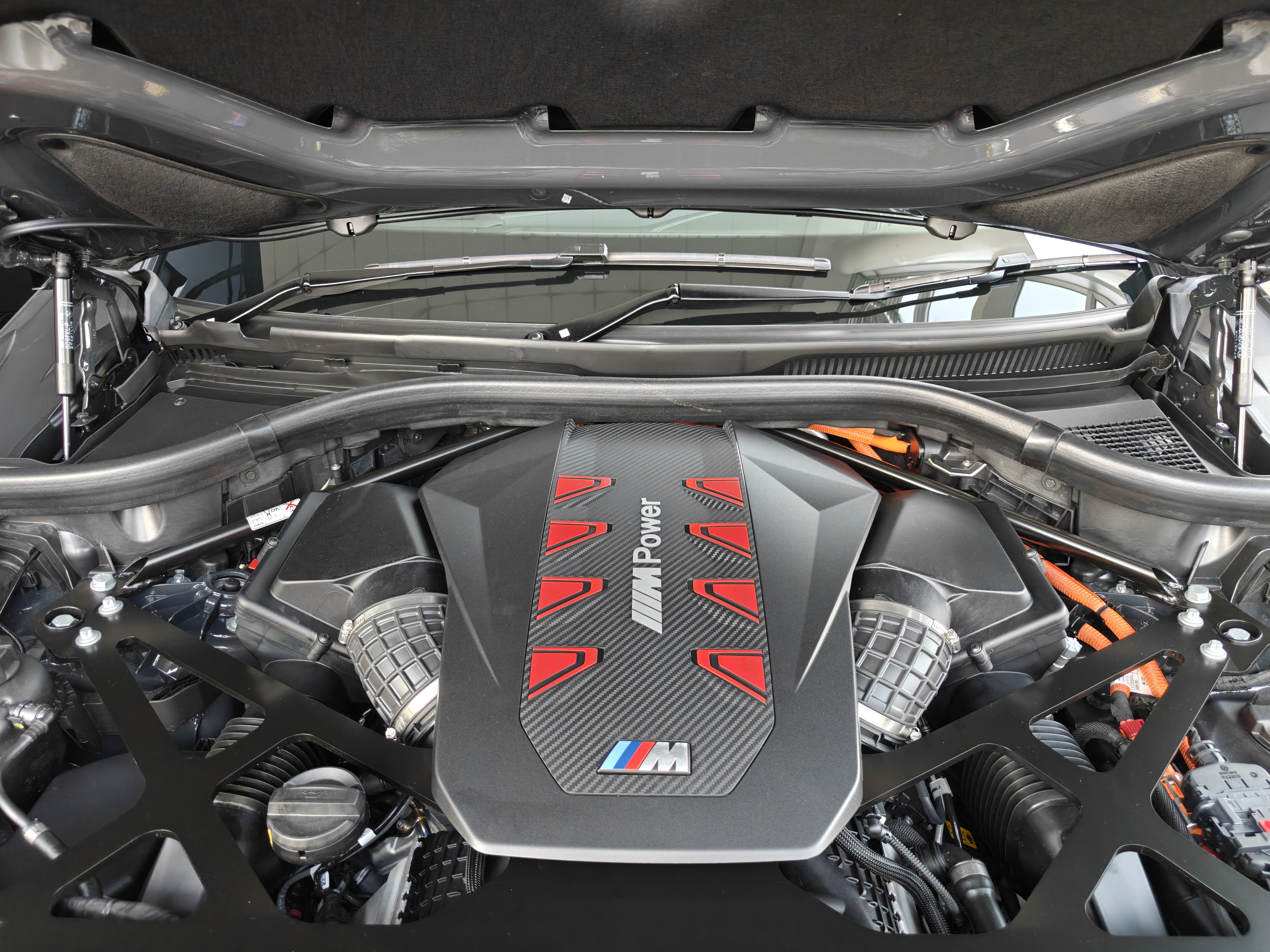
BMW XM 4.4l V8 engine

The XM's internal combustion engine, the twin-turbocharged BMW S68, has been revised to have a stronger crankshaft, and the turbochargers have been placed closer to the exhaust manifold.

It produces 360 kW (489 PS; 483 hp) and 650 N⋅m (479 lb⋅ft), and in combination with the electric motor, produces a total of 480 kW (653 PS; 644 hp) and 800 N⋅m (590 lb⋅ft). This gives the XM a 0–97 km/h (0–60 mph) time of 4.1 seconds and a quarter mile (400m) drag time of 12 seconds.

=== XM 50e ===
An entry-level trim of the XM recognized by the aluminium trim on the grille, steering wheel and XM badge, the 50e, was announced in April 2023. This trim offered a total of 350 kW (476 PS; 469 hp) and a torque output of 700 N⋅m (516 lb⋅ft) for a 0 to 62 mph (100 km/h) acceleration time of 5.1 seconds.

The 50e features a 144 kW (196 PS; 193 hp) and 281 N⋅m (207 lb⋅ft) electric motor paired with a 3.0-litre inline-six B58 gasoline engine. It shares the M xDrive all-wheel drive system, M Sport differential, and eight-speed M Steptronic transmission from the regular XM.

=== XM Label Red ===
A more powerful edition, named "Label Red", was announced on the same day the XM was unveiled, on 27 September 2023.

A limited run of 500 cars will be produced globally. It has the same 4.4 L BMW S68 V8 engine as the regular model, but upgraded to produce 430 kW (585 PS; 577 hp) and 750 N⋅m (553 lb⋅ft), for a total power output of 550 kW (748 PS; 738 hp) and 1,000 N⋅m (738 lb⋅ft) with the electric motor. It can accelerate from 0–100 km/h (0–62 mph) in 3.8 seconds with a quarter mile (400m) drag time of 11.7 seconds.

== Gallery ==
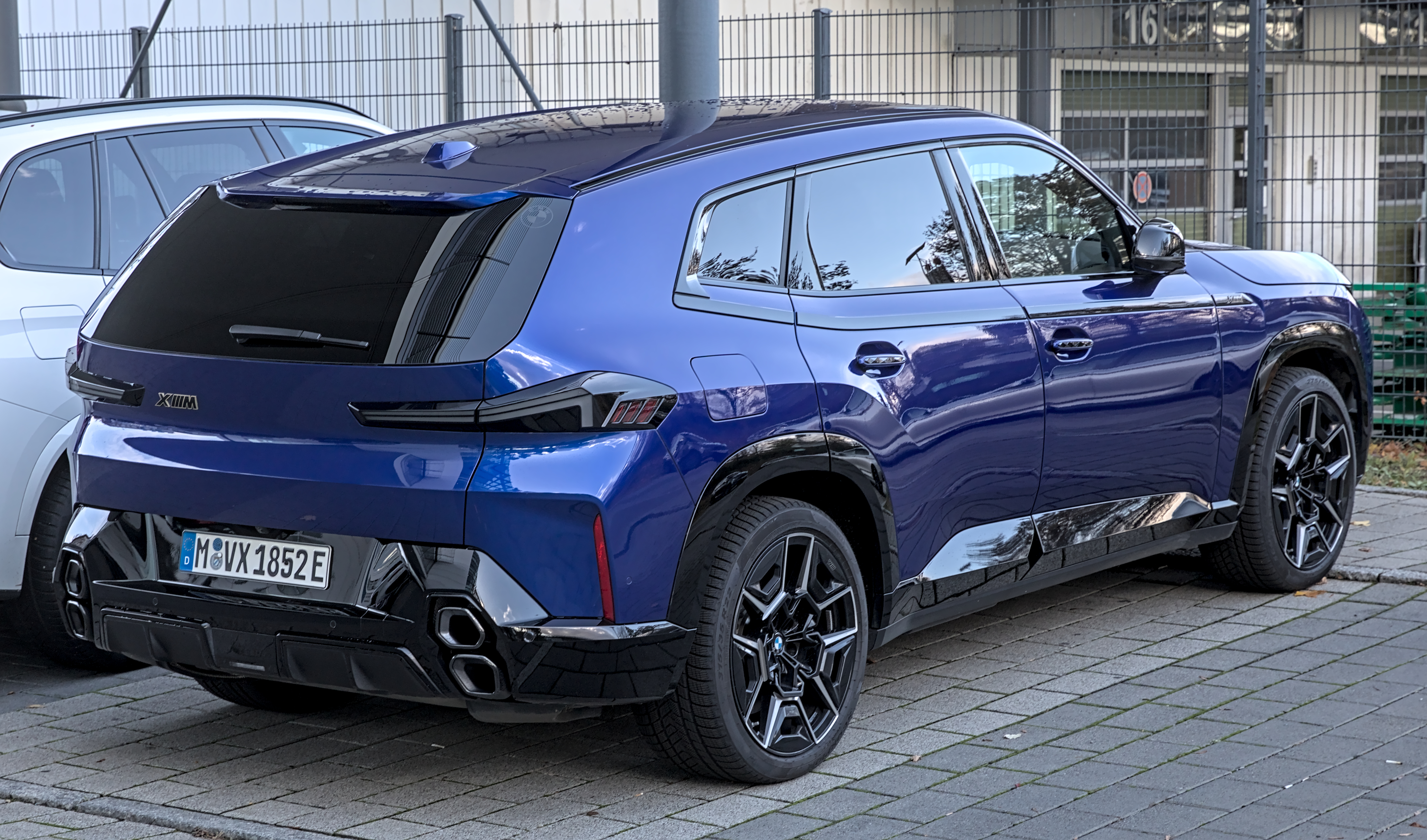
Rear view

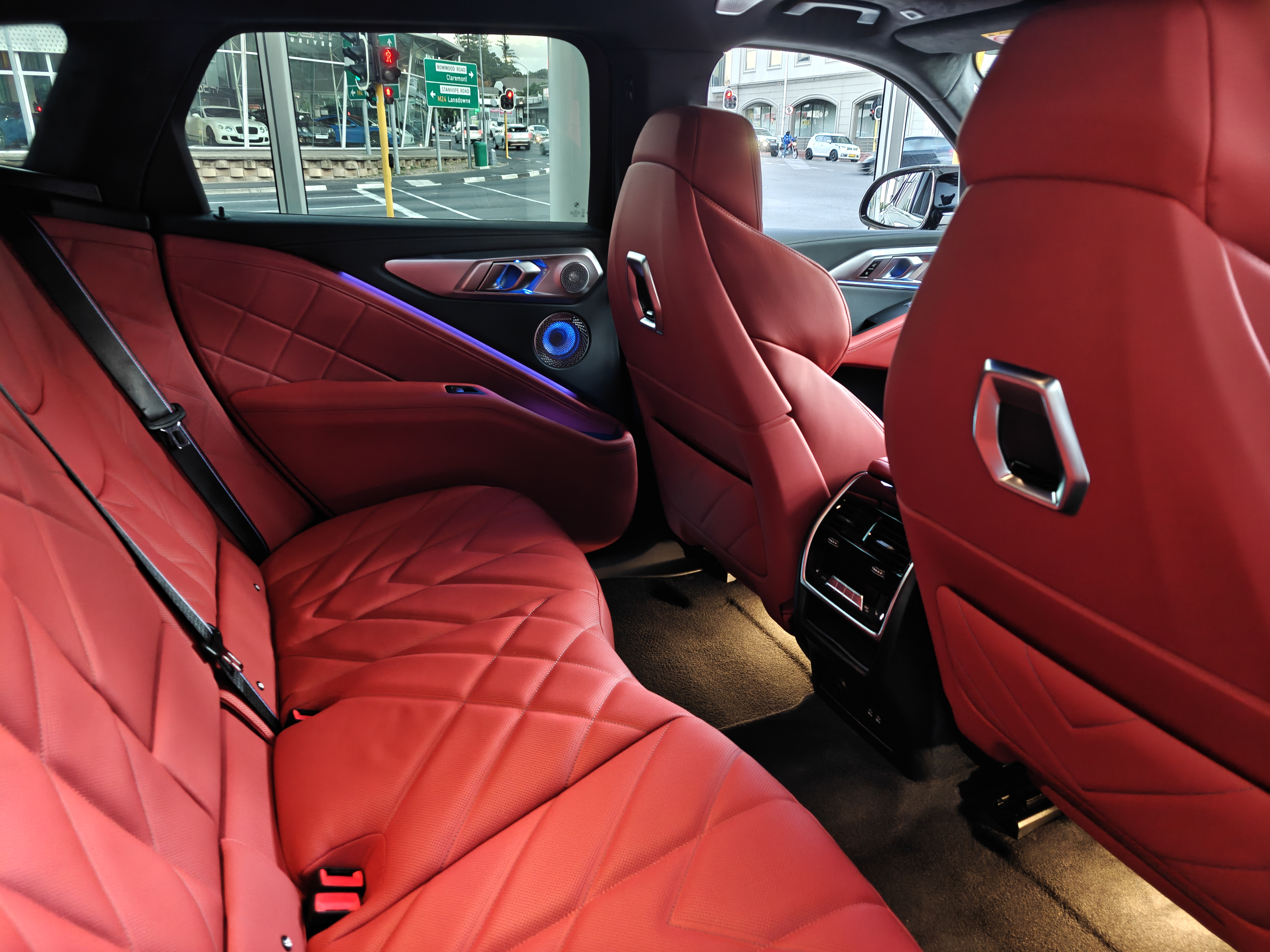
Rear passenger area

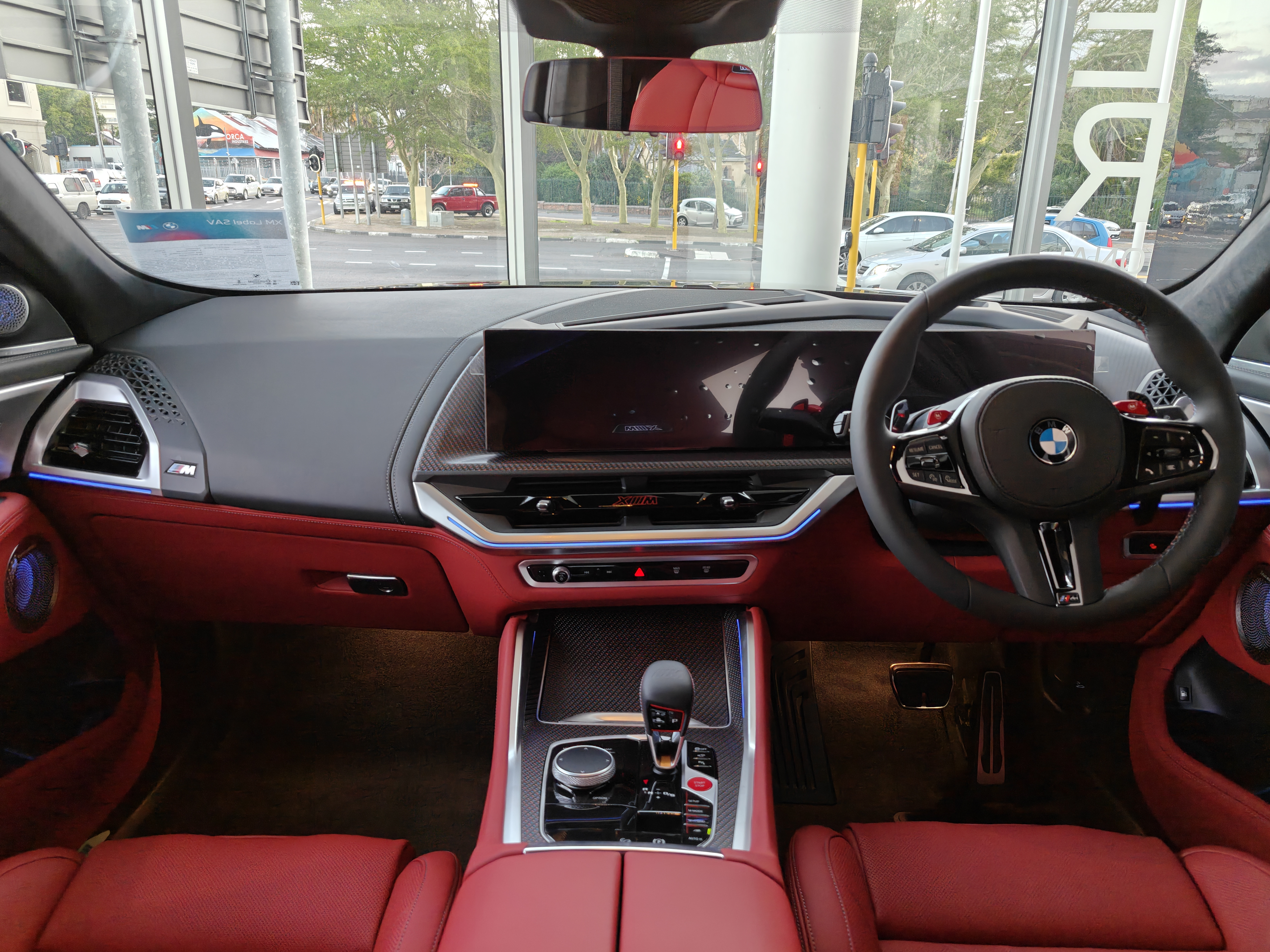
Dashboard

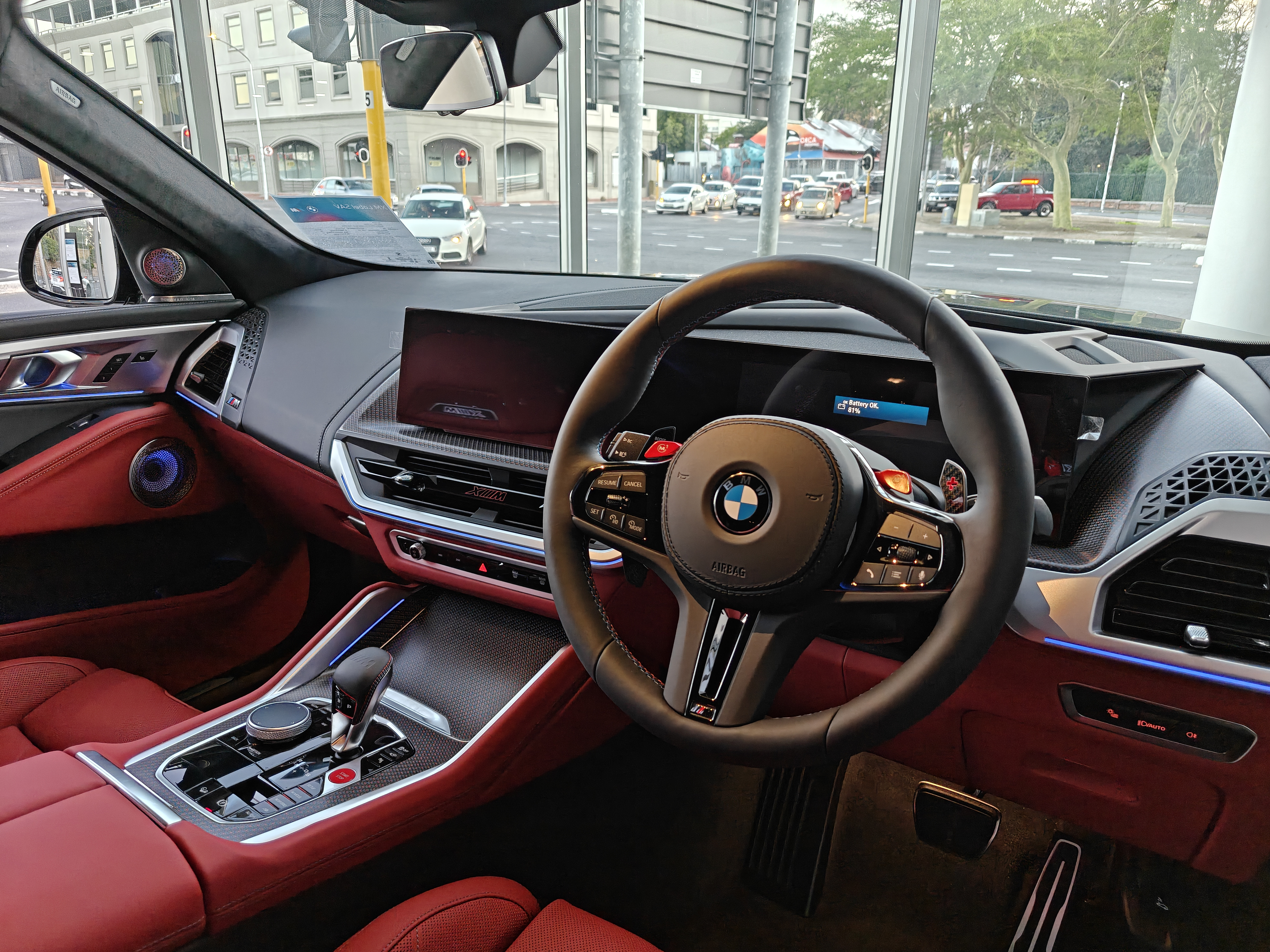
Driver's area

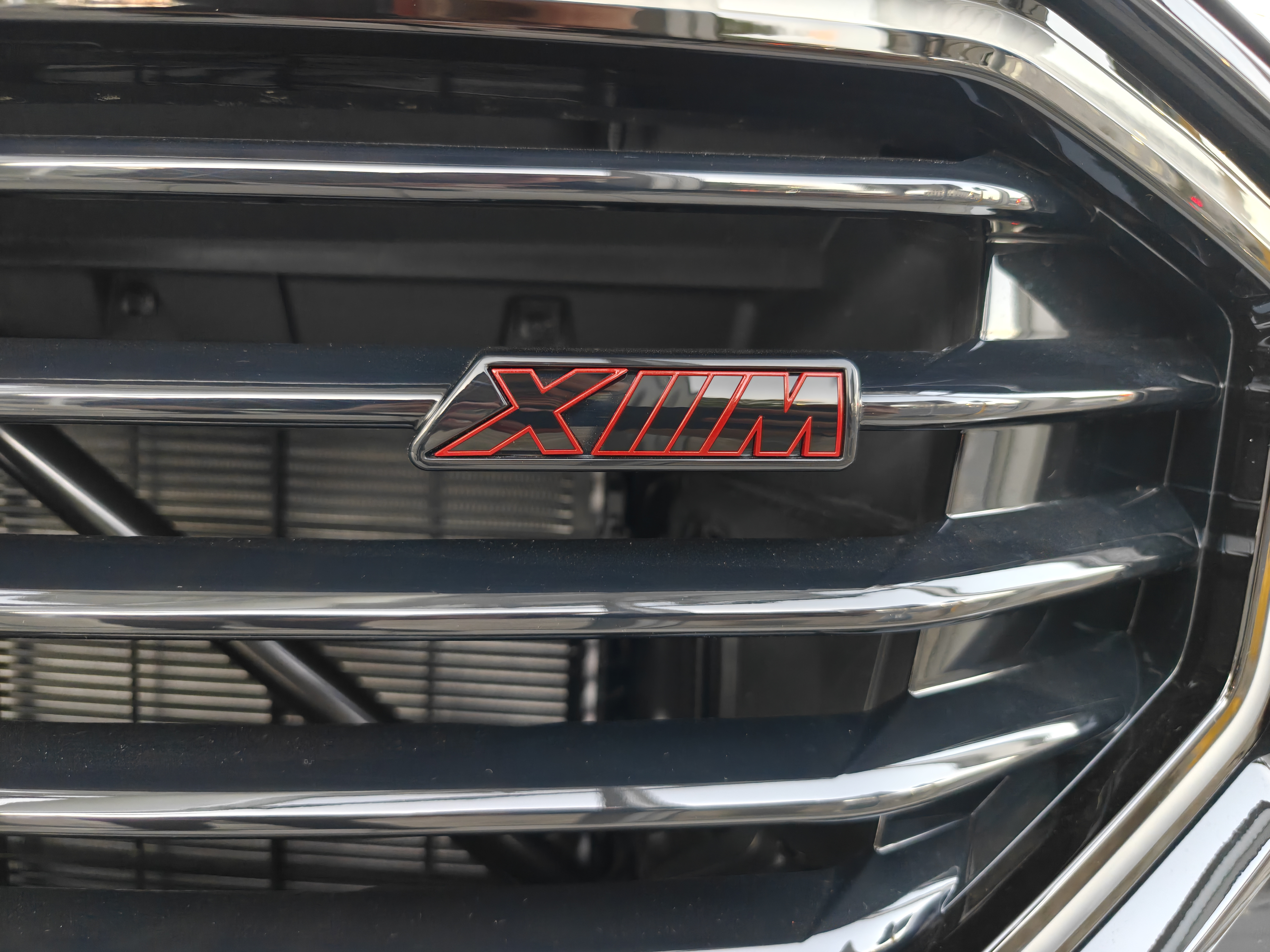
XM badge on the grille

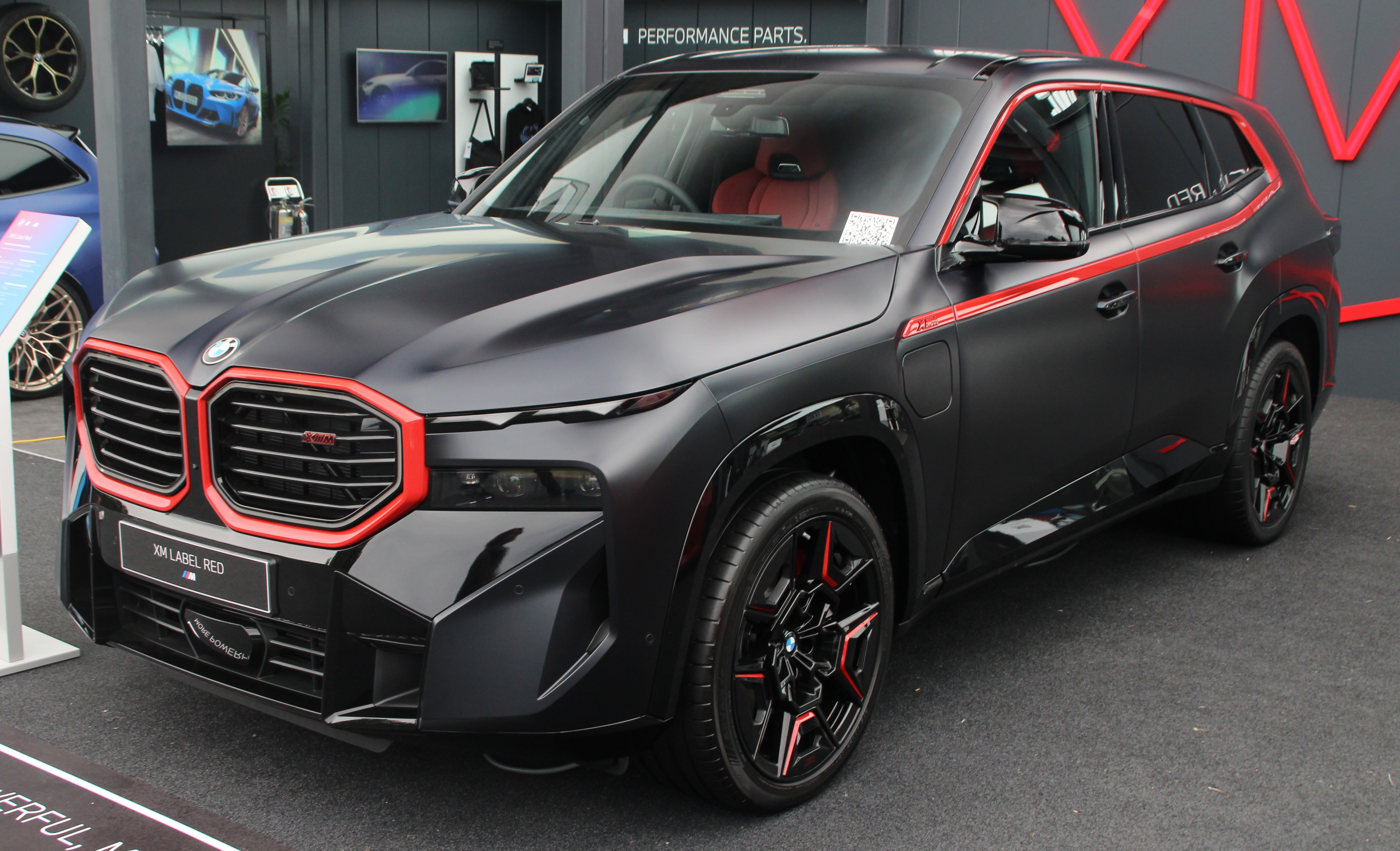
XM Label Red Edition

== Sales ==
Year	China
2023	89
2024	398
2025	300

== See also ==
- List of BMW vehicles
