= BMW S68 =

BMW S68 engine
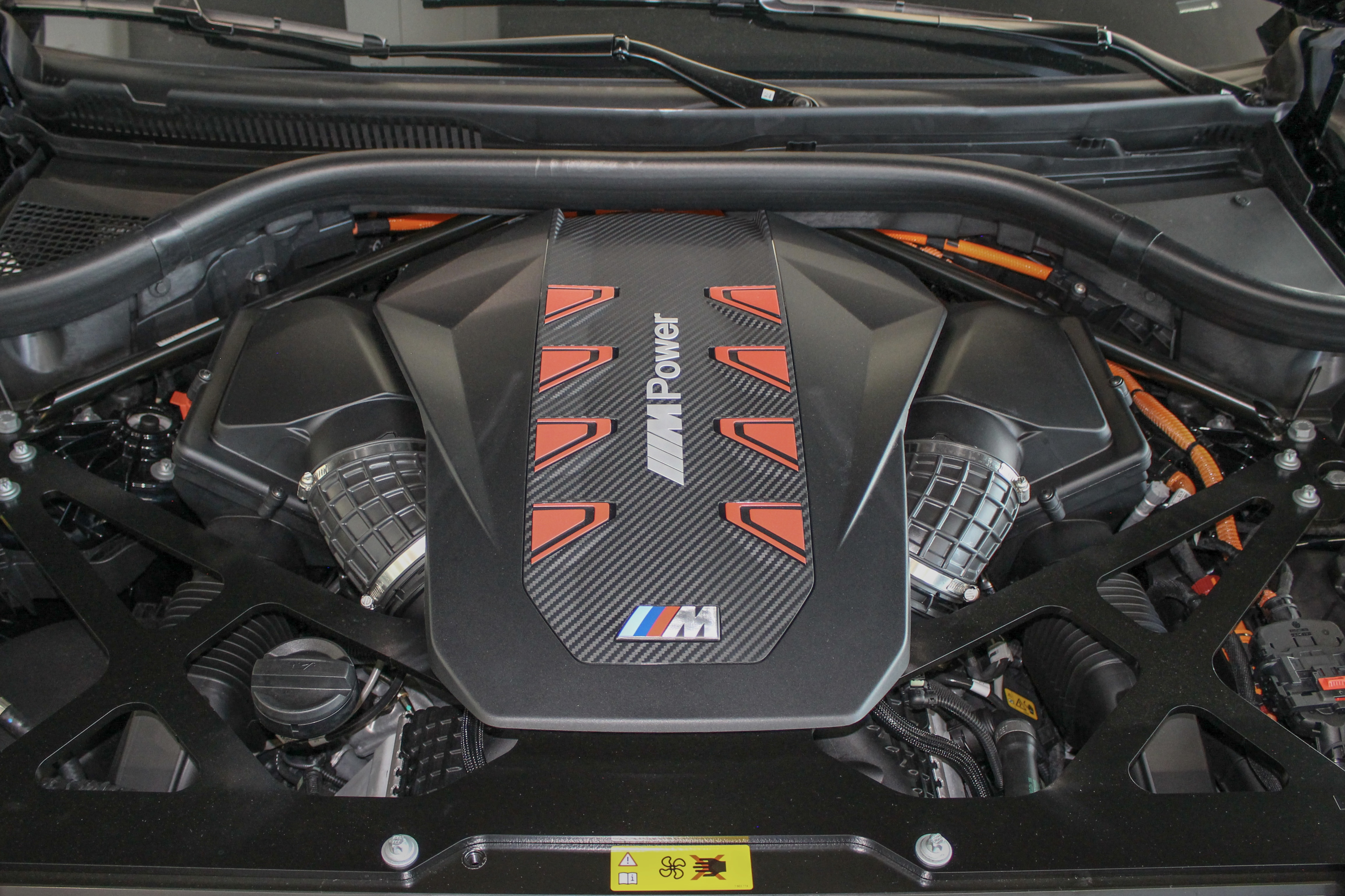
- S68 in BMW XM (G09)

Overview
- Manufacturer: BMW
- Production: 2022–present

Layout
- Configuration: 90° V8
- Displacement: 4.4 L (4,395 cc)
- Cylinder bore: 89 mm (3.50 in)
- Piston stroke: 88.3 mm (3.48 in)
- Cylinder block material: Aluminium
- Cylinder head material: Aluminium
- Valvetrain: DOHC w/ VVT

Combustion
- Turbocharger: Twin-turbo
- Fuel type: Petrol

Chronology
- Predecessor: BMW N63/S63

The BMW S68 is a twin-turbocharged V8 engine produced by BMW. Its first use was in the 2023 revised BMW X7 as the M60i. A few weeks after its presentation, BMW showed a study of the XM with a more powerful version of the engine. In addition, the basic version is also used in BMW 760i, BMW X5 M60i, and BMW X6 M60i.

== Design ==
The S68 has the same piston stroke of 88.3 mm (3.48 in) and displacement as its S63 predecessor, but the compression ratio of 10.5:1 corresponds to the higher compressed predecessor variants. It has one turbocharger per cylinder bank and both turbochargers are placed in the middle of the cylinder banks in a hot-vee design taken from the previous S63 variant; there is only one exhaust manifold. The S68 is the only current production V8 engine offered with a cross-pattern exhaust manifold for improved turbo charger pressure by combining exhaust pulses which comes at an expense of sound alternation, making the sound closer to a 180 degree configuration V8. The engine oil is cooled by an external cooler, and a newly developed oil pump is used for the oil circuit. The engine is now only offered as a 48-volt mild hybrid powerplant mild hybrid system, it has a 9 kW (12 hp) electric motor with a torque of 200 N⋅m (150 lbf⋅ft); unlike the previous mild hybrid systems from BMW, this is installed within the transmission. The electric motor is also used for hot starts, while cold starts are performed by a standard 12 volt starter similar to most other engines. The battery required for this has a 90 Ah capacity. The 48-volt battery found in the X7 M60i, XM, and the 760i models has a capacity of 20 Ah. The variable camshaft control (VANOS) is now electrical and no longer hydraulic. The S68 currently meets the Euro 6d emissions standard, but should also be able to achieve the stricter Euro 7 standard, which was planned for 2025.

The electric motor in the S68 has a torque of 200 N⋅m (150 lbf⋅ft). Maximum revs are 7200 rpm.

== Applications ==
- 2022– G70 760i xDrive
- 2022– G09 XM
- 2023– G05 X5 M60i
- 2023– G06 X6 M60i
- 2024– F95 X5 M Competition
- 2024– F96 X6 M Competition
- 2023– G07 X7 M60i
- 2023– G07 Alpina XB7
- 2024– G90/G99 M5
- 2024– Range Rover (L460)
- 2024– Range Rover Sport (L461)
- 2024– Land Rover Defender OCTA

== See also ==
- List of BMW engines
