= BMW in the United States =

Coordinates: 34°53′35″N 82°10′44″W

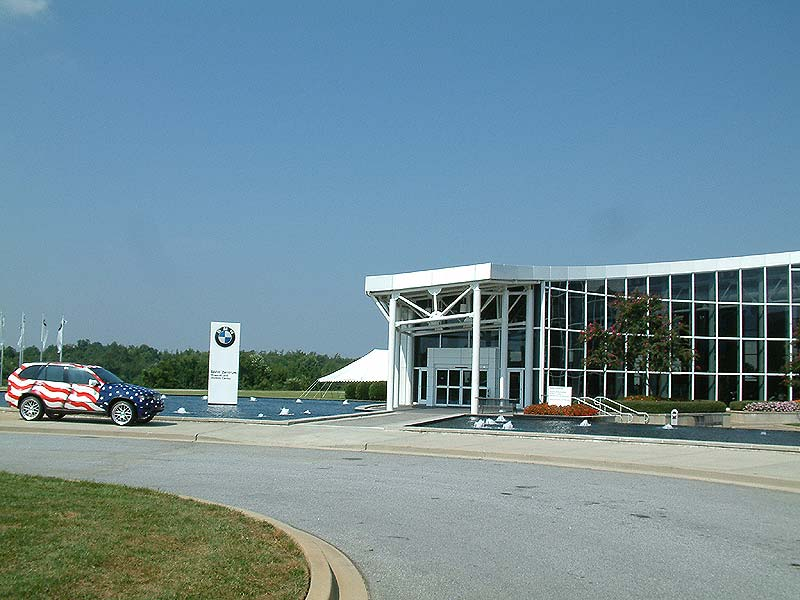
BMW Zentrum (visitor center) at the Spartanburg factory, with the "Stars and Stripes" X5 (First Gen. X5 (E53))

BMW of North America, LLC is the American subsidiary of German car manufacturer BMW. Its headquarters are located at Woodcliff Lake, Bergen County, New Jersey.

BMW cars have been officially sold in the United States since 1956. Max Hoffman was the exclusive importer from 1962 until 1975, when BMW of North America was established.

In 2016, BMW was the twelfth highest selling brand in the United States.

The BMW Spartanburg manufacturing plant in Greer, South Carolina, opened in 1994, had the highest production volume of the BMW plants worldwide, with 396,117 units in 2025. The models produced at the Spartanburg plant are the X3, X5, X6, X7, and XM SUV models.

In addition to the South Carolina manufacturing facility, BMW's North American companies include sales, marketing, design, and financial services operations in the United States, Mexico, Canada, and Latin America. The North American headquarters for its large financial services subsidiary is located in Columbus, Ohio and is responsible for the captive lending for BMW automotive, BMW Motorsport, and Rolls-Royce cars, when buyers lease the vehicles or decide to finance directly with the company.

== Spartanburg manufacturing plant ==
BMW Manufacturing Co., LLC
- Type: Division
- Industry: Automotive
- Founded: 1992; 34 years ago, Greer, South Carolina
- Headquarters: Greer, South Carolina, United States
- Area served: Worldwide
- Key people: Robert Engelhorn (president)
- Products: Automobiles
- Number of employees: 11,000
- Parent: BMW
- Website: bmwgroup.com/spartanburg

The BMW Manufacturing Co., LLC, also known as BMW Spartanburg, is the BMW Group's only assembly facility in the United States, and is located in Greer, South Carolina. The plant is currently BMW's major global production site for the X3, X5, X6, X7, and XM crossover SUVs, whose biggest market is the U.S., while other BMW models sold in the U.S. market are imported.

=== History ===
In 1992, BMW announced that it would build a 1,150-acre (470 ha) manufacturing facility in Spartanburg County, South Carolina, United States to strengthen its international production system. The plant opened in 1994.

In 2010, BMW announced that it would spend $750 million to expand operations at the Greer plant. This expansion will allow production of 240,000 vehicles a year and will make the plant the largest car factory in the United States by number of employees. BMW's largest single market is the United States, where 339 dealerships sold 346,023 cars in 2015.

The two millionth vehicle built at BMWUSM rolled off the plant in January 2012., a vermilion red BMW X3 xDrive35i. The vehicle was retained on display at the Spartanburg Plant to commemorate the milestone. The six millionth unit was produced in October 2022, a green BMW X6 M.

The plant is the largest BMW plant in the world in terms of vehicle production volume. In 2025, the Spartanburg plant produced 396,117 cars, of which 225,000 units were exported at a value of $10.1 billion.

In 2018, around 70% of production was exported to 125 markets. The biggest export market was China, accounting for one-third of all export. That same year, BMW ceased exporting the X3 to China.

Most units are transported by rail to the nearby dry inland port, 200 miles (320 km) from the port of Charleston. Some air freight is also used.

=== Current products ===
- X3
- X5
- X6
- X7
- XM

=== Previous products ===
- BMW 3 Series (E36) (1994–1996; also produced in Germany and South Africa)
  - 318i Sedan (1994–1995)
  - 318is Coupe (1994–1995)
  - 328i Sedan (1996)
- BMW Z3 (E36/4) (1995–2002)
  - Roadster
  - M Roadster
  - Coupe
  - M Coupe
- BMW Z4 (E85) (2003–2008; successive generation produced in Germany)
  - Roadster
  - M Roadster
  - Coupe
  - M Coupe
- BMW X4 (2014–2025)

== Model range differences in the U.S. ==
=== Models offered only in the United States ===
There are several models which have been solely sold in the United States:

- 1971-1977 BMW New Six Bavaria: This US-only model offered the more powerful engine in a car with fewer luxury features.
- 2005-2016 BMW M5 manual transmission options: The United States and Canada were the only markets where the E60 and F10 M5 was available with a manual transmission.

=== Engine availability differences ===
Several BMW engines have not been officially sold in the United States, due to emissions regulations. These include:

- M20: Early versions of the M20 engine, which used Jetronic fuel-injection, were not sold in the US.
- M52: Due to high-sulfur fuel in the US at the time, most M52 engines sold in the US used an iron block, instead of the aluminium block used in other markets.
- N53: Due to high-sulfur fuel, the US was one of several countries where the N53 was not sold. Instead, its N52 predecessor remained in use in these countries.
- S50/S52: For the E36 M3, the United States used different engines to the models used in most other markets. The S50B30US and S52 engines used in the US are less powerful than the equivalent Euro-specification S50 engines.
