= BMW Pininfarina Gran Lusso Coupé =

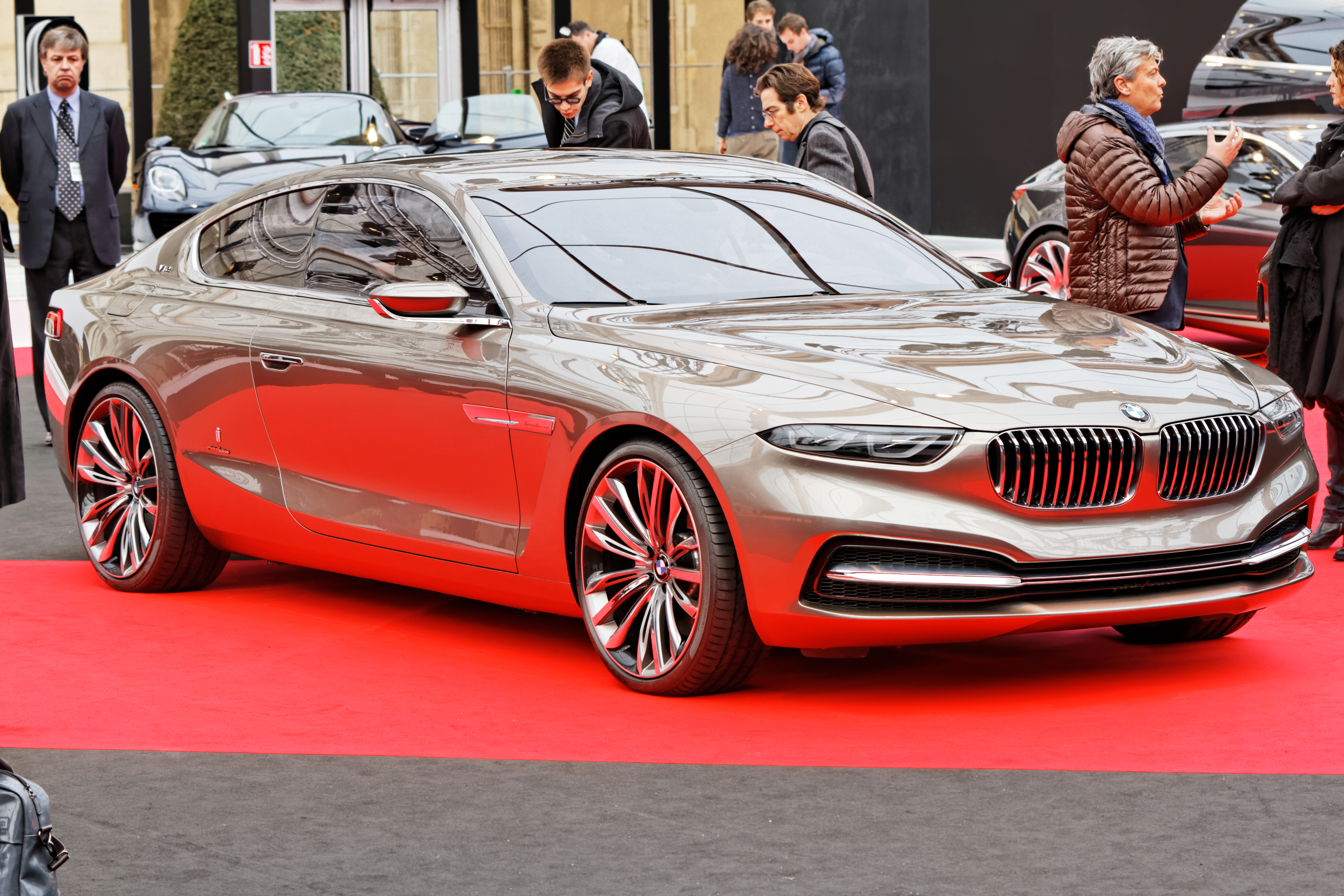

Overview
- Manufacturer: BMW
- Production: 2013
- Designer: Pininfarina

Body and chassis
- Class: concept car

The BMW Pininfarina Gran Lusso Coupé is a concept car presented at the Concorso d'Eleganza Villa d'Este in 2013 by BMW in collaboration with Pininfarina. It is also the first collaborative vehicle between Pininfarina and BMW.

== Overview ==
Built to anticipate the new BMW 8 Series, the Gran Lusso Coupé features a 2-door coupé body with generous external dimensions and a very long wheelbase relative to the vehicle's volumes. It is equipped with a 6.0 L twin-turbocharged V12 engine developed by BMW.

== Design ==
Aesthetically, the BMW Pininfarina Gran Lusso Coupé incorporates typical stylistic features of the German brand, such as the classic double kidney grille seen on all standard BMWs and the iconic Hofmeister kink. However, these elements are completely reinterpreted and reworked according to the design philosophy of the Turin-based coachbuilder, Pininfarina.

The front of the car is distinguished by slim LED headlights, which, together with the slightly forward-leaning "shark-nose" double kidney grille—a nod to the BMW models of the 70s and 80s—form a cohesive design. The car is also equipped with 21-inch wheels, further adding to its imposing presence.

Inside, the vehicle seats four passengers and features extensive use of leather and kauri wood from New Zealand, giving it an air of luxury and sophistication. The side profile highlights a classic grand tourer layout, with a long bonnet and a cabin positioned far towards the rear.

At the rear, the car is fitted with a quad-exhaust system, and the taillights consist of LED elements that merge into a singular design.

For its styling and overall design, the Gran Lusso Coupé won the 2013 Good Design Award.
