= BMW 8 Series =

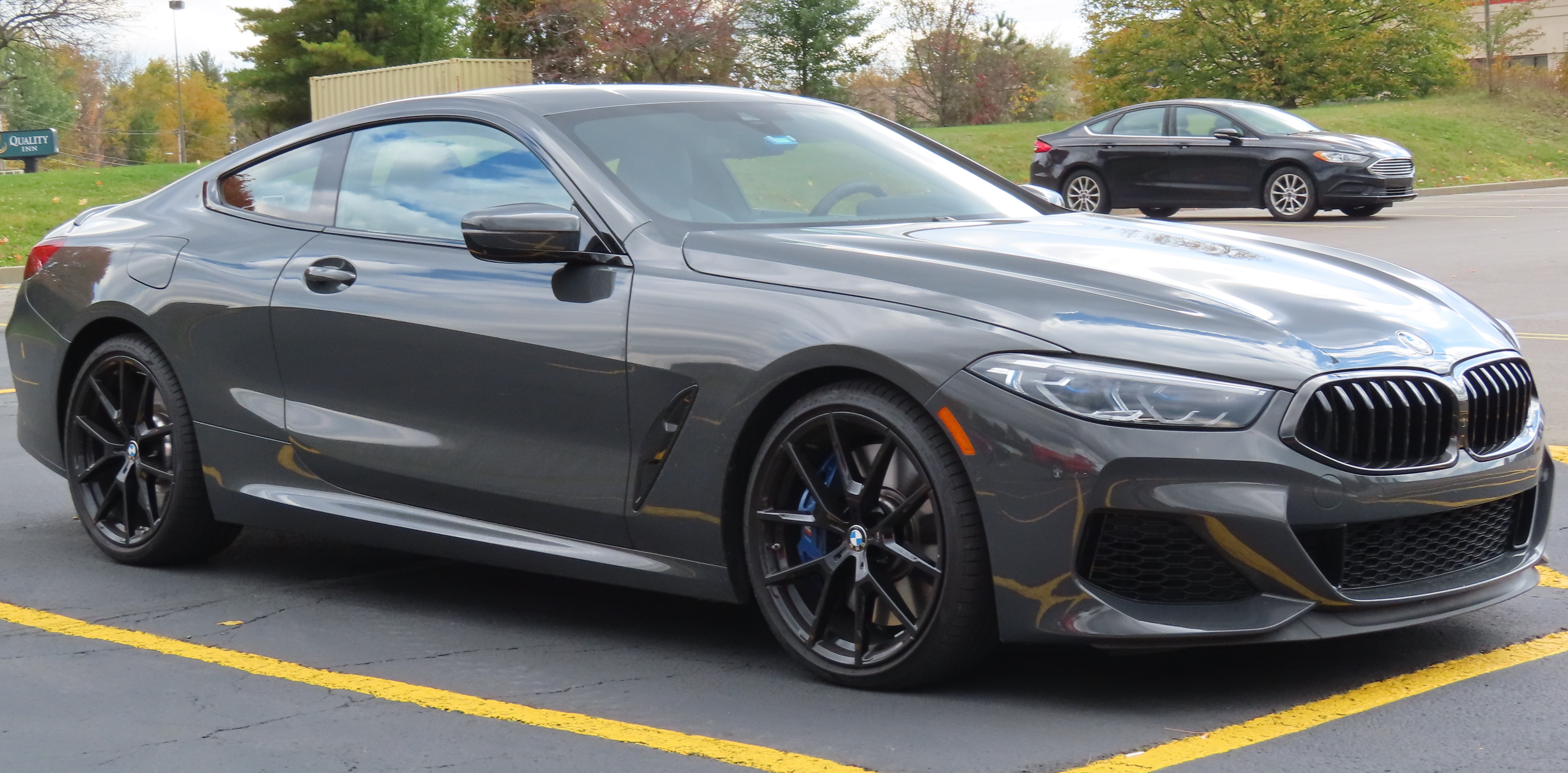

Overview
- Production: 1990–1999; 2018–2026

Body and chassis
- Class: Grand tourer (S); Executive car (E) (Gran Coupe)
- Body style: 2-door coupé; 2-door convertible; 4-door sedan
- Layout: Rear-wheel drive; All-wheel drive (xDrive)

The BMW 8 Series is a range of grand tourer coupes and convertibles produced by BMW.

The 8 Series was introduced in 1990 under the E31 model code and was only available as a two-door coupé. It is powered by a range of naturally aspirated V8 and V12 petrol engines. The E31 started production just as E24 6 Series production ended; however, it is not considered a direct successor. The E31 was discontinued in 1999 due to poor sales.

The model range was later reintroduced in 2018 with the second generation, G15 8 Series. It launched in coupé (G15), convertible (G14), and four-door Gran Coupé (G16) body styles, as the successor to the F06/F12/F13 6 Series lineup. The G15 8 Series introduces an inline-six diesel engine, and a high-performance BMW M8 trim later joined the lineup as well as the luxury inspired Alpina B8.

== First generation (E31; 1990) ==
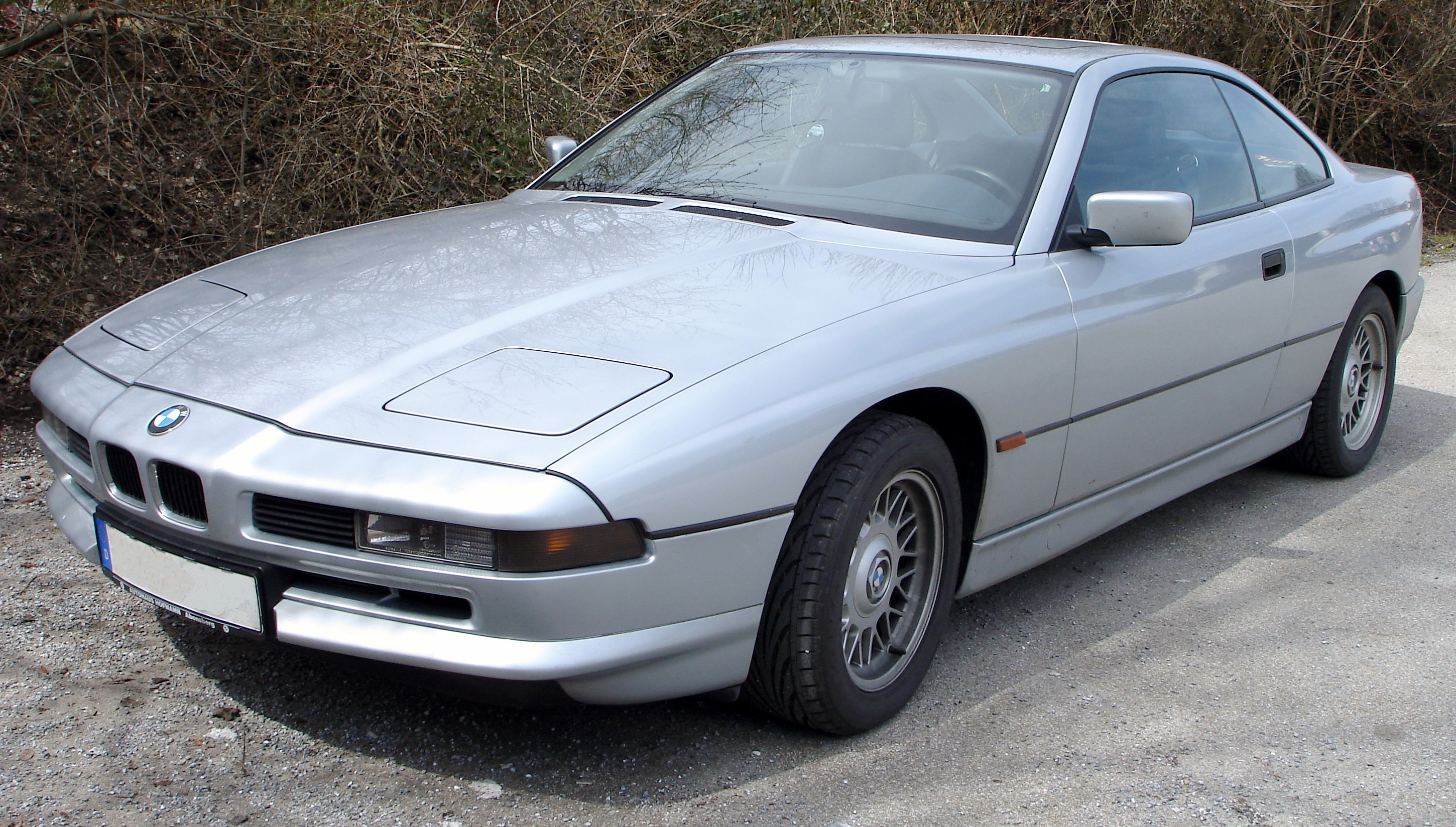
E31 front

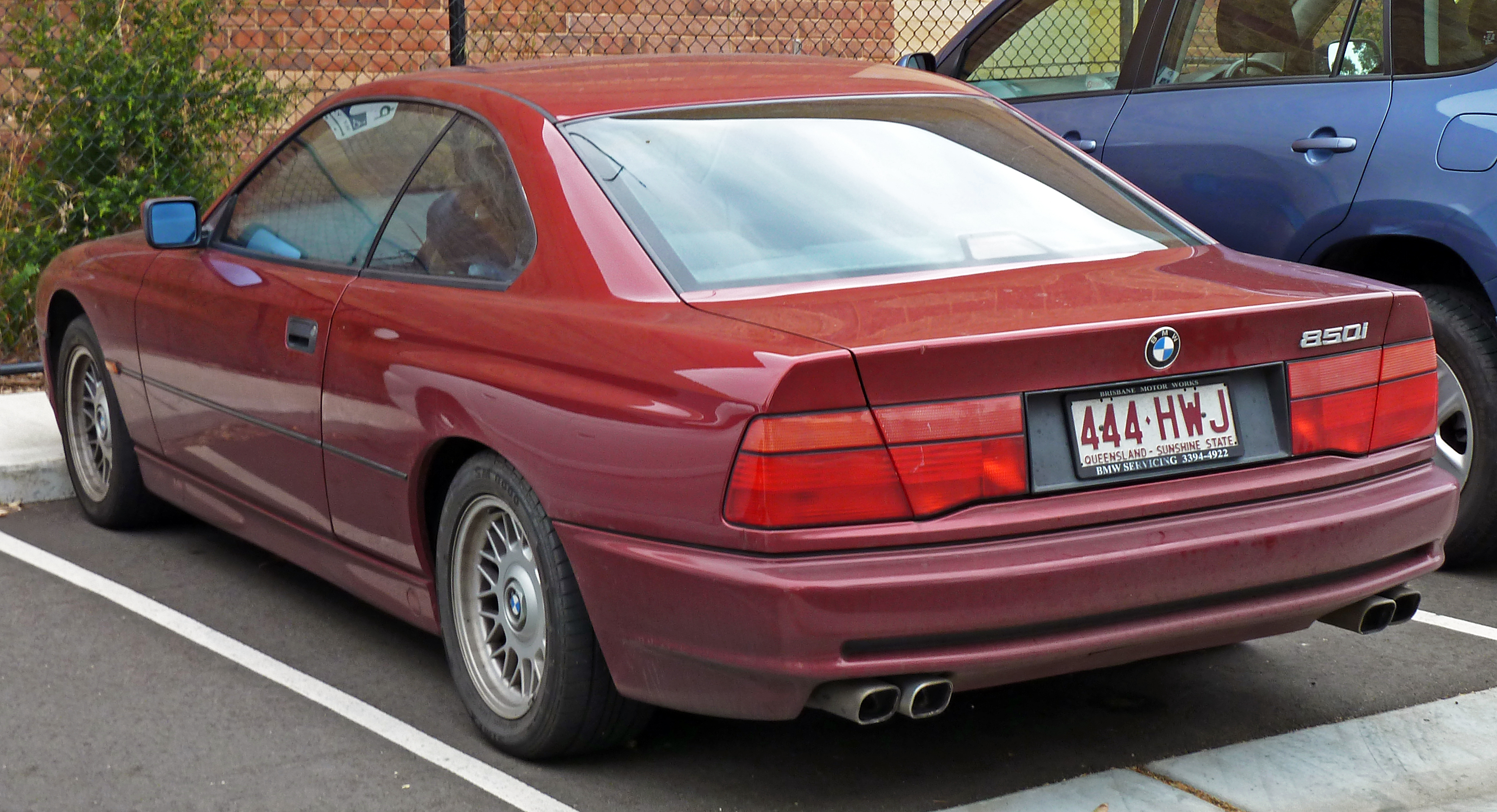
E31 rear

Design work of the first generation E31 8 Series began in 1984, with final design phase and production development starting in 1986. The car debuted at the 1989 Frankfurt Motor Show and was produced until 1999. The 8 Series was designed to move beyond the market of the original E24 6 Series, featuring greater performance and an increased price. The 8 Series was the first road car to offer a V12 engine mated to a 6-speed manual transmission and was one of the first vehicles to be fitted with electronic drive-by-wire throttle. The 8 Series was also one of BMW's first cars to use a multi-link rear axle.

== Second generation (G14/G15/G16; 2018) ==
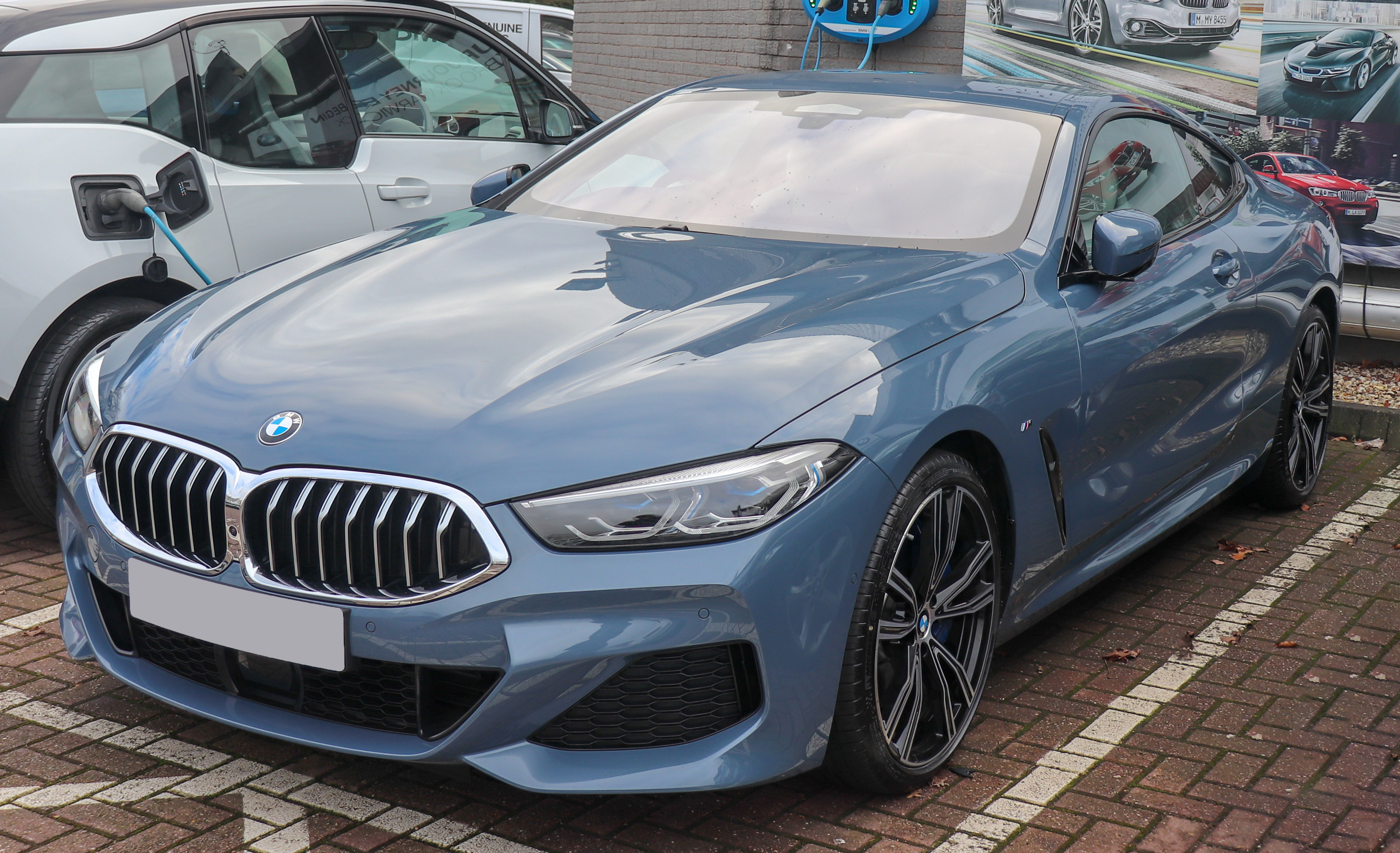
G15 front

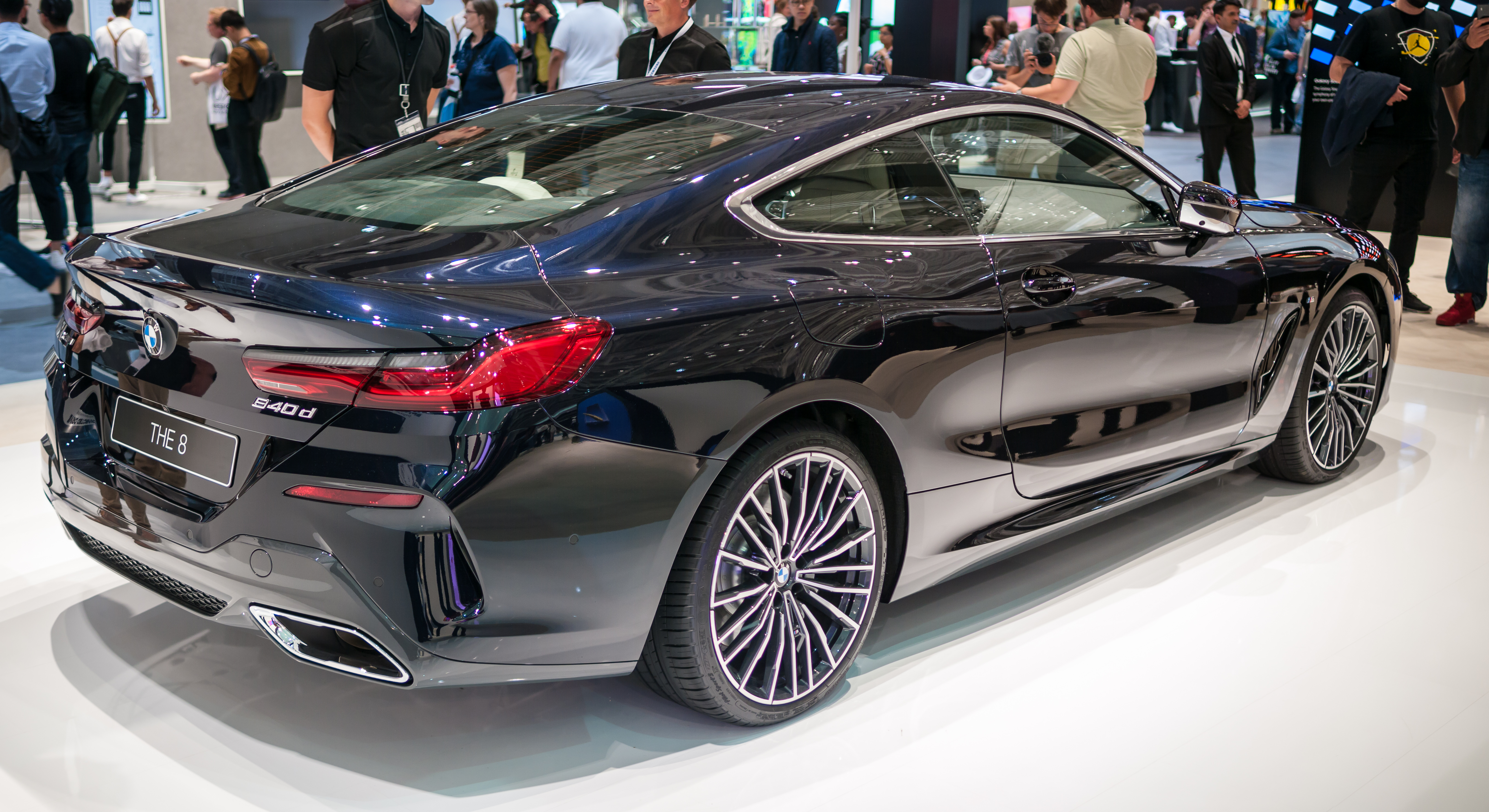
G15 rear

The BMW 8 Series (G14) was announced on 15 June 2018, with sales commencing from November 2018. It was initially available as a coupé (codenamed G15), with the convertible (G14) and four-door Gran Coupé (G16) variants introduced later, succeeding the F06/F12/F13 6 Series lineup. Production commenced in late 2018 at the BMW assembly plant in Bangkok, Thailand & Dingolfing, Germany.

Direct competitors to the BMW 8 Series coupé and convertible are the Mercedes-AMG GT coupé & cabriolet and Porsche 911 coupé & cabriolet. The 8 series was initially conceived to be a high end competitor to brands like Ferrari and Porsche. At the time the brand had wanted to create a new luxury tier of vehicles with black branding, the 8 series and the X8 would be ultra luxury BMWs aimed at the space just below Rolls and share appointments with the high end British brand to help reduce costs. BMW was seen as falling behind in the electric vehicle sector and plans were tabled, the 8 series being the lone product of the idea and some appointments such as the crystal shift knob are the only remnants of the ultra luxury concept. For the second time in BMWs history the push up market with an 8 series branded line struggled due to poor timing. The 6 series had been platform mates with the 7 series since its conception and the current 8 series is closest to a 5 series though has the carbon fiber core from the 7 series which is reflected in the price increase when compared to the 6 series it replaced. The BMW 8 Series Gran Coupé which has improved rear passenger space dimensions compared to the BMW 6 Series Gran Coupé (F06), is seen as a flashier sportier alternative to its platform-mate, the more traditional BMW 5 Series sedan, and it competes with the Mercedes-AMG GT 4-Door Coupé and Porsche Panamera.

In 2022, BMW updated the 8 Series with an updated look and tech. The Iconic Illuminated Glow kidney grille has been added, as is a larger 12.3-inch infotainment system that replaces the 10.25-inch unit.

The M8 Competition Coupe was unveiled in 2020 in the Geneva International Motor Show

=== Engine ===
At launch, the 8 Series was powered by a six-cylinder petrol engine making 230 kW (313 PS; 308 hp) and 460 N⋅m (339 lbf⋅ft), an engine also used in the new BMW 7 series. Further engines will follow soon after the start of production. All units will receive a 48-volt vehicle electrical system, which together with the belt alternator starter (BAS) comprises the PHEV system (Plug-In Hybrid Electric Vehicle).

== See also ==
- List of BMW vehicles
