= BMW 8 Series (G15) =

BMW 8 Series (G14/G15/G16)
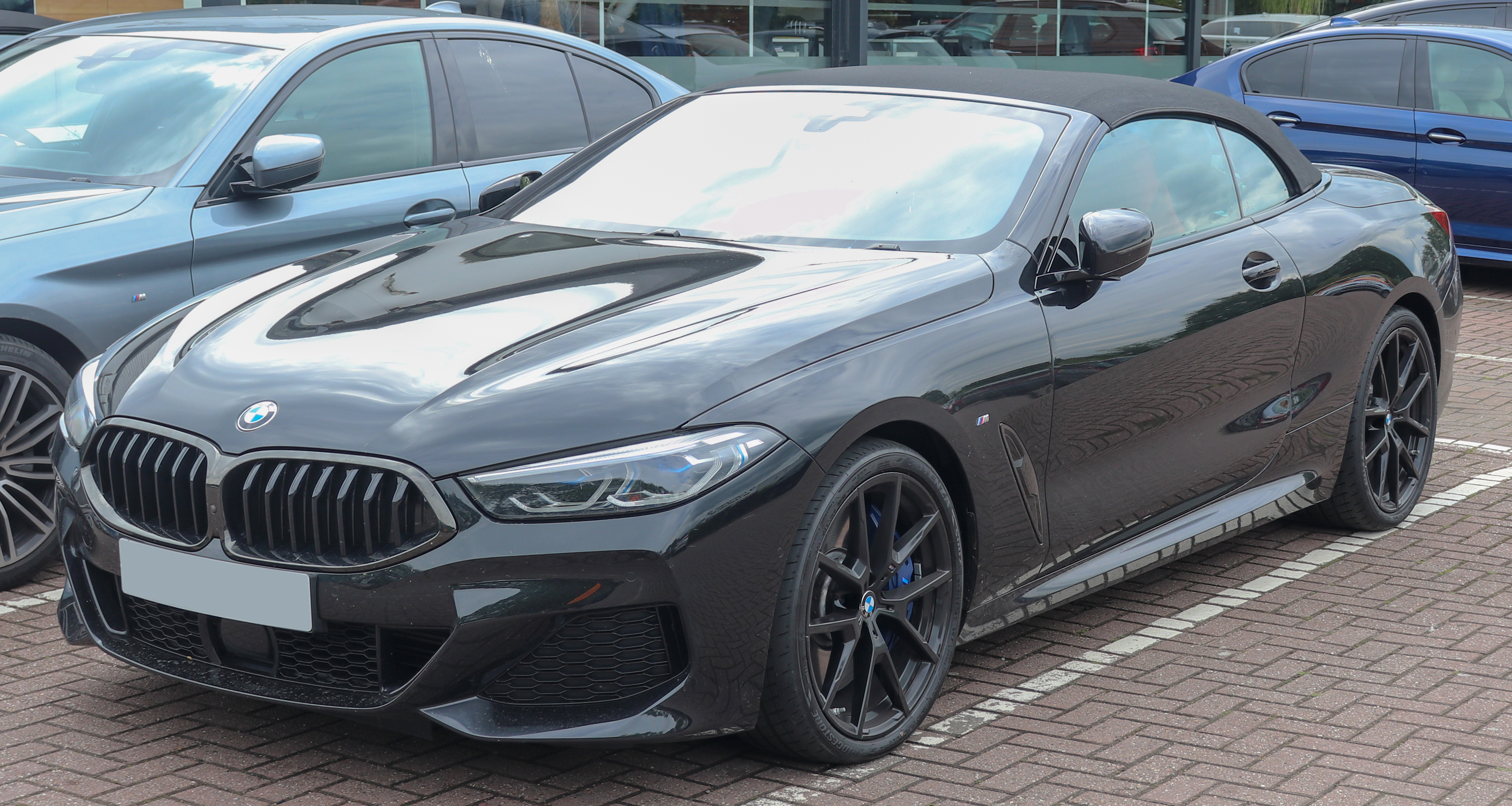
- 2019 BMW 840d xDrive convertible (G14)

Overview
- Manufacturer: BMW
- Also called: Alpina B8
- Production: 2018 – 2026
- Assembly: Germany: Dingolfing
- Designer: John Buckingham (G14, G15); Jacobo Domínguez (G16)

Body and chassis
- Class: Grand tourer (S) (coupé/convertible); Executive car (E) (Gran Coupé)
- Body style: 2-door convertible (G14); 2-door coupé (G15); 4-door saloon (G16)
- Layout: Front-engine, rear-wheel-drive; Front-engine, all-wheel-drive (xDrive)
- Platform: BMW CLAR platform
- Related: BMW M8 (F91/F92/F93)

Powertrain
- Engine: Petrol: 3.0 L B58 T I6; 4.4 L N63 TT V8; 4.4 L S63 TT V8; Diesel: 3.0 L B57 TT I6
- Electric motor: 8 kW (11 hp) electric boost (Diesel engine)
- Transmission: 8-speed automatic
- Hybrid drivetrain: MHEV (840d)

Dimensions
- Wheelbase: G14/G15: 2,822 mm (111.1 in); G16: 3,023 mm (119.0 in)
- Length: G14/G15: 4,843 mm (190.7 in); G16: 5,072 mm (199.7 in)
- Width: 1,902–1,932 mm (74.9–76.1 in)
- Height: 1,341–1,397 mm (52.8–55.0 in)

Chronology
- Predecessor: BMW 6 Series (F06/F12/F13) (for body style); BMW 8 Series (E31) (for 8-series nameplate)

The second-generation of the BMW 8 Series consists of the BMW G14 (convertible version), BMW G15 (two-door coupé version) grand tourers and BMW G16 (four-door "Gran Coupe" saloon version) executive cars (E). The G14/G15/G16 generation has been in production since 2018, and is often collectively referred to as the G15.

It is the successor to the BMW 6 Series (F06/F12/F13) range and marks the return of the BMW 8 Series nameplate after nearly two decades, which was previously produced as the E31 until its discontinuation in 1999. In the autumn of 2025, BMW announced that the G15 would be discontinued without replacement (with German sales ending soon thereafter), ending the nameplate once again.

The G15 is powered by turbocharged six-cylinder petrol, six-cylinder diesel, and V8 petrol engines, all mated to an 8-speed automatic transmission. While the initial release of models all included all-wheel drive, a rear-wheel drive version of the base 840i and 840d was later made available for sale.

The M8 models (designated F91/F92/F93) were unveiled in June 2019 and are powered by the twin-turbocharged BMW S63 V8 petrol engine.

== Development and launch ==
The BMW 8 Series is based on the BMW Concept 8 Series that debuted at the 2017 Concorso d’Eleganza Villa d’Este, and featured a new design language and iteration of the iDrive system.

The production version was officially unveiled at the 24 Hours of Le Mans on June 15, 2018.

The convertible version of the 8 Series (G14) was launched in November 2018. The convertible features a folding cloth roof that operates in 15 seconds and can function up to 50 km/h (31 mph). Changes over the coupé include; new cross struts, new panels for the underbody and aluminium roll over bars for added safety. Initial models for the convertible include the M850i xDrive and 840d xDrive. The convertible weighs an additional 100 kg (220 lb) more than the coupé.

Sales of the 8 Series commenced in November 2018.

The high-performance variant BMW Concept M8 Gran Coupé was later introduced in June 2019 at the 2018 Geneva Motor Show.

The Gran Coupé sedan (G16) of the 8 Series was announced in June 2019 and went on sale in September 2019. It has the same powertrains as the coupé and convertible, but it is the first 8 Series available with a six-cylinder engine for the United States. The 8 Series Gran Coupé has enlarged rear passenger space dimensions including improved headroom compared to the 6 Series Gran Coupé (F06) that it replaced. Like its predecessor, the 8 Series Gran Coupé is seen as a flashier sportier alternative to its platform-mate, the more traditional BMW 7 Series (G11) sedan, and it competes with the Mercedes-AMG GT 4-Door Coupé and Porsche Panamera.

== Body and chassis ==
The production model is based on the modular CLAR platform and has a design largely unchanged from the Concept 8 Series. The wheelbase of the Gran Coupe is 201 mm (7.9 in) longer than the coupe and convertible models.

The 8 Series utilises a double-wishbone front suspension and rear multi-link suspension. The car uses BMW's Carbon Core technology, integrating carbon-fibre within its chassis. GPS navigation data is used for the 8-speed automatic transmission to predict upshifts or downshifts when approaching a junction, and cameras along with sensors are utilised to determine appropriate shutdowns for the engine start-stop system.

Most trims feature the xDrive all-wheel drive system, although the base 840i and 840d have rear-wheel drive available. The M850i xDrive is available worldwide, while the 840d xDrive is only available in Europe.

The official kerb weight (measured using the EU methodology) for the M850i xDrive is 1,965 kg (4,332 lb) for the coupe version and 2,090 kg (4,608 lb) for the convertible version. The kerb weight for the 840d xDrive is 1,890 kg (4,167 lb) coupe version and 2,030 kg (4,475 lb) for the convertible version.

== Equipment ==
Standard equipment includes an 8-speed ZF 8HP torque-converter automatic transmission, Vernasca leather, a heads-up display, adaptive suspension, power steering, and split folding rear seats. The 8 Series also features a 260 mm (10 in) display with iDrive 178 and 312 mm (7.0 and 12.3 in) digital instrument cluster. All 8 series models can be fitted with M Performance Parts. These include a sport steering wheel, M rims and carbon fibre parts. The M850i xDrive receives 20-inch wheels as standard and aerodynamic elements such as larger air intakes and a front lip spoiler.

Available options includes Microsoft Office 365 and Skype for Business integration, laser headlights, a display key fob, and a Bowers & Wilkins Diamond Surround Sound System. Near field communication can also be used to unlock the car via a smartphone. An M Sport package is also available on the 840d xDrive model and features 19-inch alloy wheels, an enhanced braking system, and a re-designed sports steering wheel.

== Models ==
=== Petrol engines ===
Model	Years	Engine	Power	Torque	0–100 km/h (0–62 mph)
840i / 840i xDrive	2019–2026	3.0 L B58 turbo I6	250 kW (340 PS; 335 hp) at 5,000–6,500 rpm	450 N⋅m (332 lb⋅ft) at 1,600–4,500 rpm	5.3 seconds / 4.9 seconds
M850i xDrive	2019–2026	4.4 L N63 twin-turbo V8	390 kW (530 PS; 523 hp) at 5,500–6,000 rpm	750 N⋅m (553 lb⋅ft) at 1,800–4,600 rpm	3.7 seconds
M8	2020–2025	4.4 L S63 twin-turbo V8	441 kW (600 PS; 591 hp) at 6,000 rpm	750 N⋅m (553 lb⋅ft) at 1,800–5,700 rpm	3.3 seconds
M8 Competition	2020–2025	4.4 L S63 twin-turbo V8	460 kW (625 PS; 617 hp) at 6,000 rpm	750 N⋅m (553 lb⋅ft) at 1,800–5,860 rpm	3.2 seconds
Alpina B8	2021–2026	4.4 L N63 twin-turbo V8	456 kW (620 PS; 612 hp) at 5,550-6,500 rpm	800 N⋅m (590 lb⋅ft) at 2,000–5,000 rpm	3.3 seconds

=== Diesel engines ===
Model	Years	Engine	Power	Torque	0–100 km/h (0–62 mph)
840d xDrive	2018–2026	3.0 L B57 + electric boost MHEV turbo I6	250 kW (340 PS; 335 hp) at 4,400 rpm	700 N⋅m (516 lb⋅ft) at 1,750–2,250 rpm	4.8 seconds

== Special models ==
=== BMW M8 ===
The M8 version was introduced in June 2019 and is the road-legal version of the M8 GTE introduced at the 2017 Frankfurt Motor Show. The body styles for the M8 are the 2-door convertible (F91 model code), 2-door coupé (F92 model code) and 4-door "Gran Coupé" fastback (F93 model code).

The M8 uses the 4.4 L (269 cu in) BMW S63 twin-turbocharged V8 engine, with an 8-speed torque converter automatic transmission and a 7-speed single clutch with an all-wheel drive (xDrive) system shared with the F90 M5. The M8 is available in standard and Competition variants: the Competition models receive a slightly more powerful engine, a carbon fibre roof, firmer suspension, forged alloy wheels, and a variety of other enhancements.

In reference to the M8 Gran Coupé Concept from 2018, the first eight vehicles of the production series of the M8 Gran Coupé were styled in the same colors as the concept vehicle and sold as M8 Gran Coupé First Edition.

=== Alpina ===
The Alpina B8 based on the 8 series Gran Coupé was launched in 2021. Aside from the traditional Alpina alloy wheels and some minor details such as quad, chromed exhaust tips and Alpina Blue brake calipers, there is little that sets the subdued Alpina apart from the outside.

=== Night Sky Edition ===
In January 2019, a one-off version called the M850i xDrive Coupé Night Sky Edition was unveiled that features a special paint color and interior trim made from Muonionalusta-meteorite. The edition celebrates the 25th anniversary of BMW Individual, as well as the Quadrantids meteor shower which was going on at the time of its introduction. The coupé had its public debut at the 2019 Geneva Motor Show. For the time being, the coupe remains in the possession of BMW.

== Production ==
The 8 Series was produced at the BMW Group Plant Dingolfing in Germany. Production of the M8 ended in 2025, while the regular 8-series was taken out of production at the end of April, 2026.

The following are the production figures for the 8 Series:

Year	Production
2018	923
2019	12,219
2020	20,703
2021	> 14,165
2022	
Total:	> 48,010

=== Asia ===
The second generation 8 Series Coupé was launched in Thailand in December 2018. In April 2021 the 8 Series Gran Coupé was launched in China. The 8 Series Gran Coupé is assembled by BMW Thailand as one of the first BMW products to be produced by BMW there. The M8 Competition Type A12/2M was launched in Pakistan in 2019, one year after its launch in India. As of 2019, the second generation of the BMW 8 Series was also the first generation of the 8 Series to be sold in Bangladesh. In May 2019, the second generation 8 Series went on sale in Oman. It was introduced to the Indonesian market in October 2018 and to the Thai market in February 2020. Sales in Japan ended in June 2024.

== Gallery ==
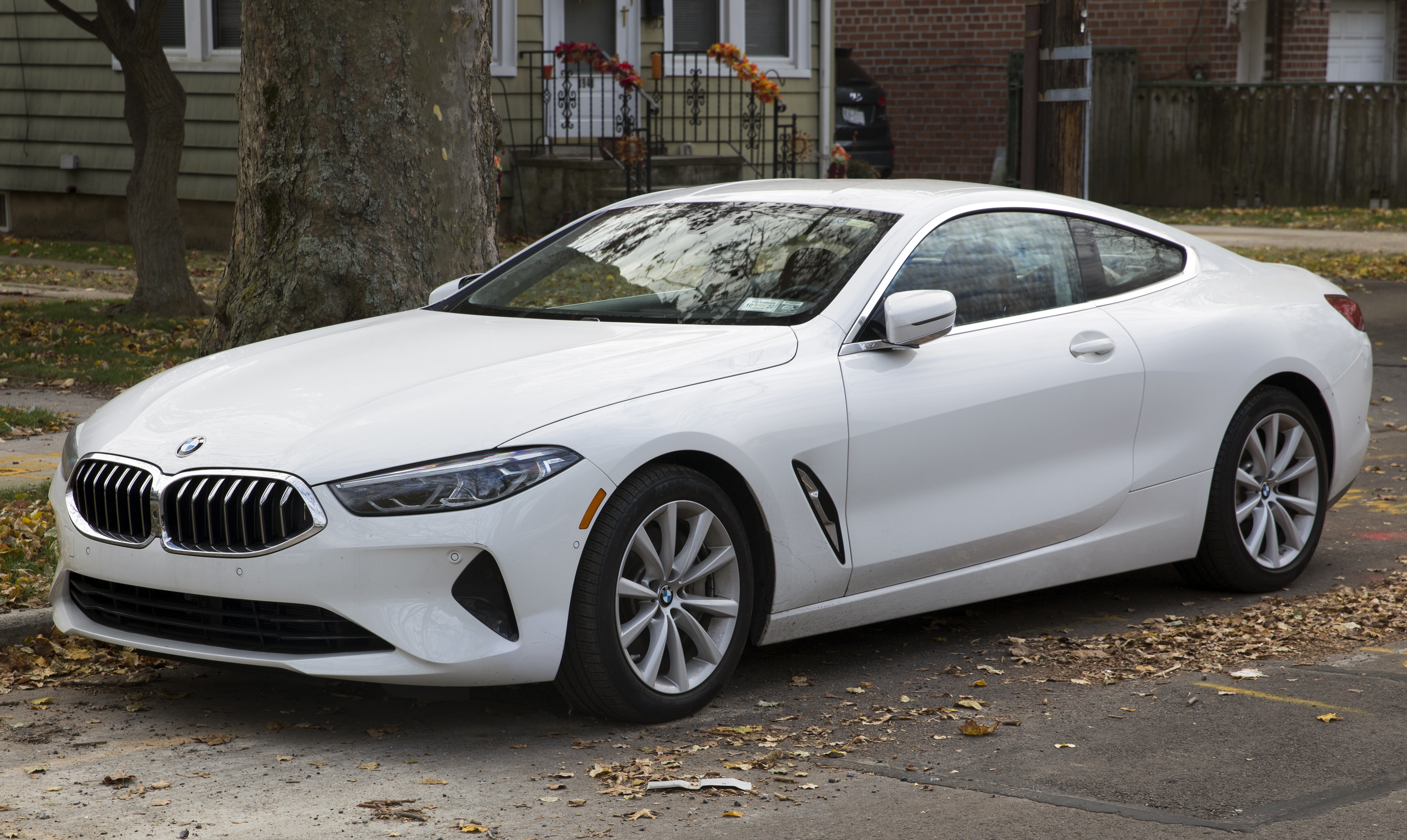
BMW 840i Coupé (G15)

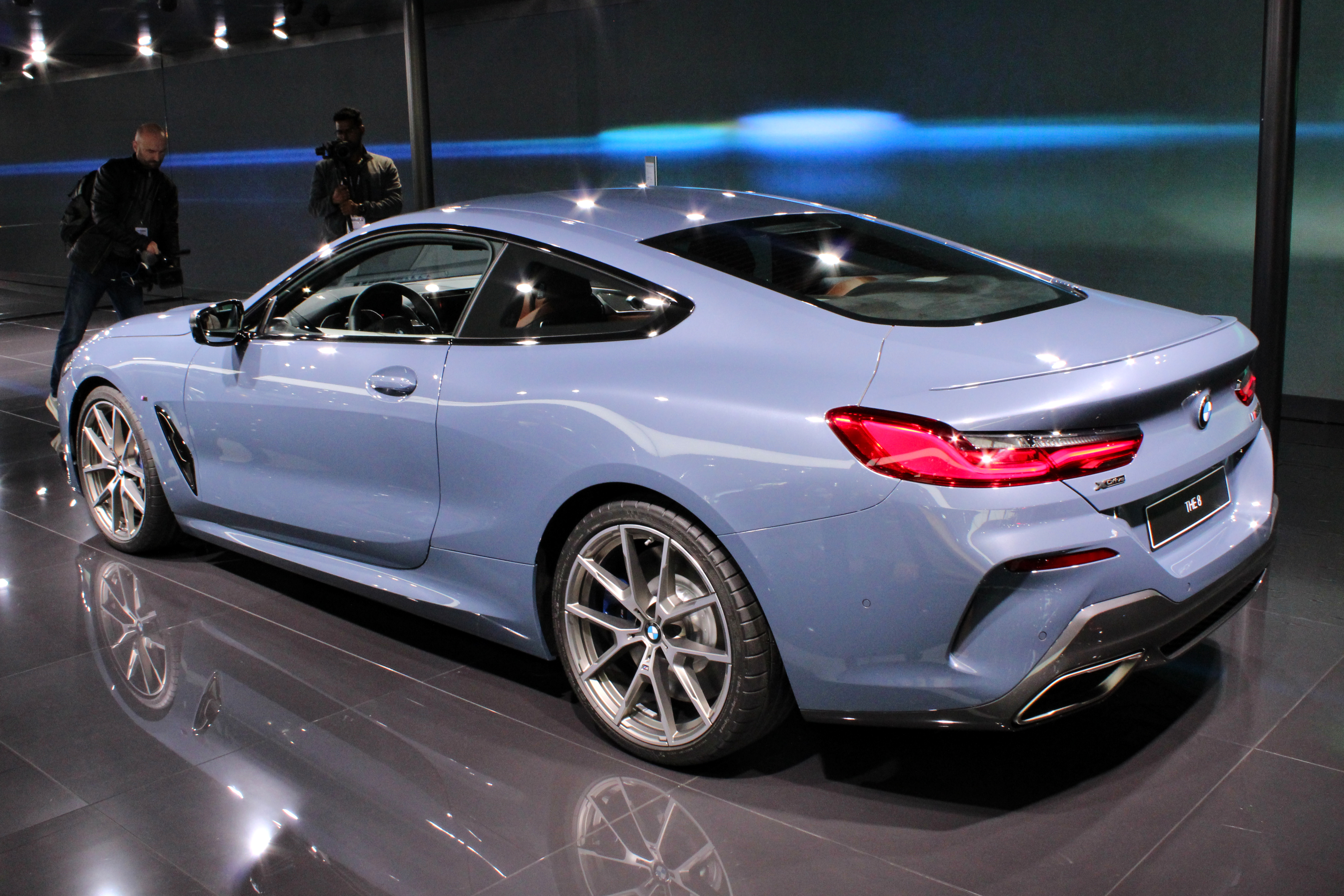
BMW 840d (G15)

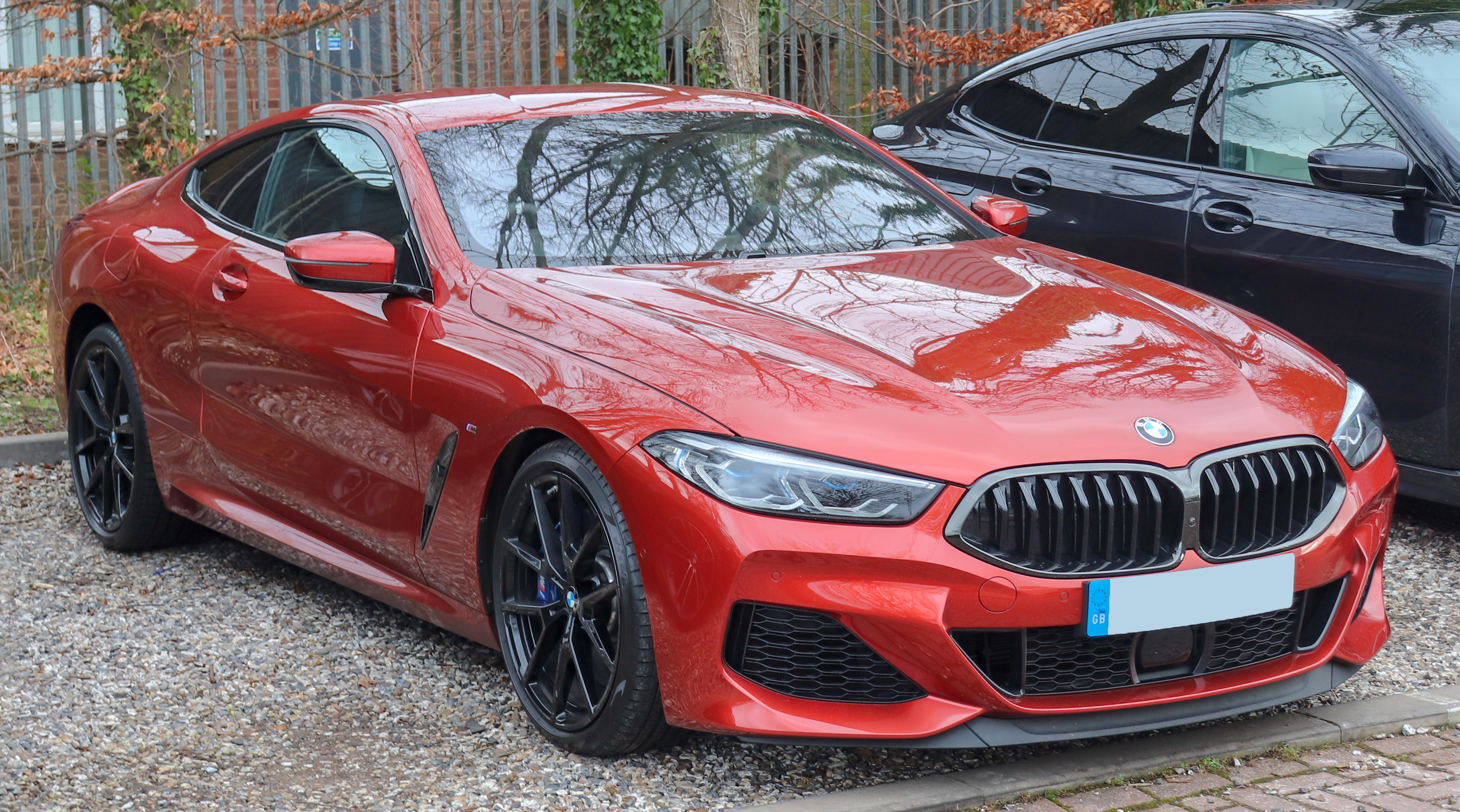
BMW M850i xDrive (G15)

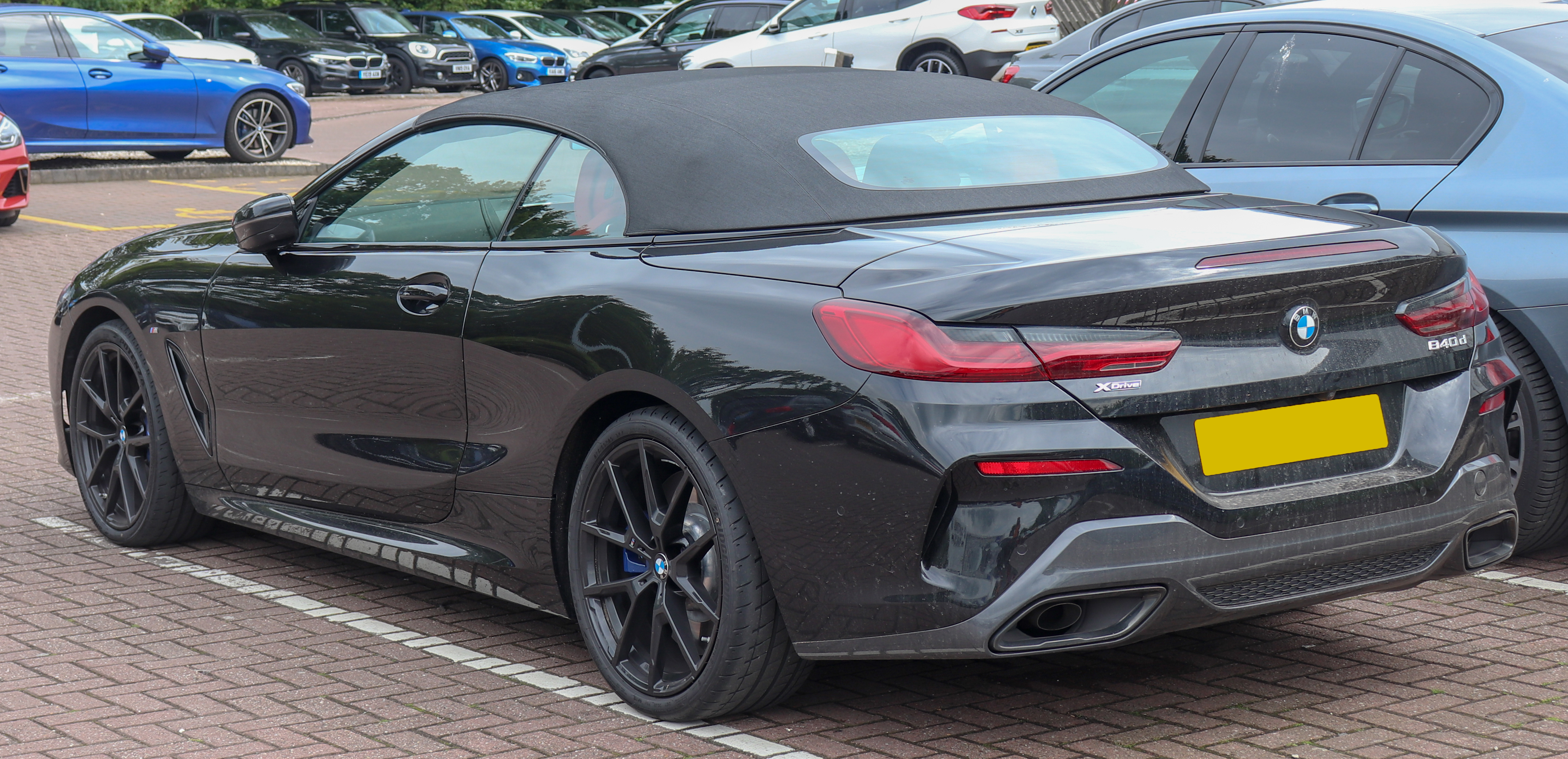
BMW 840d convertible (G14)

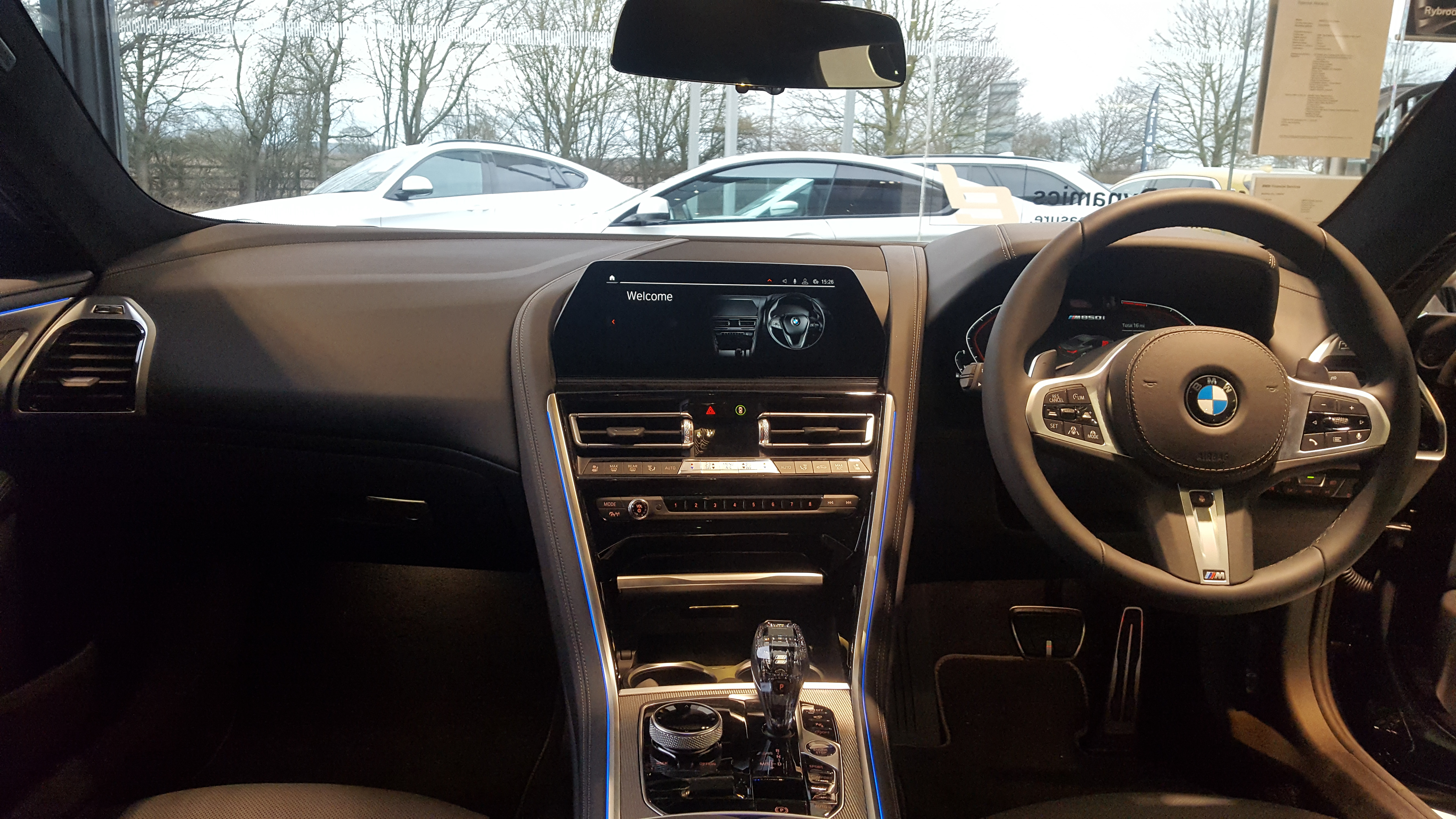
Interior

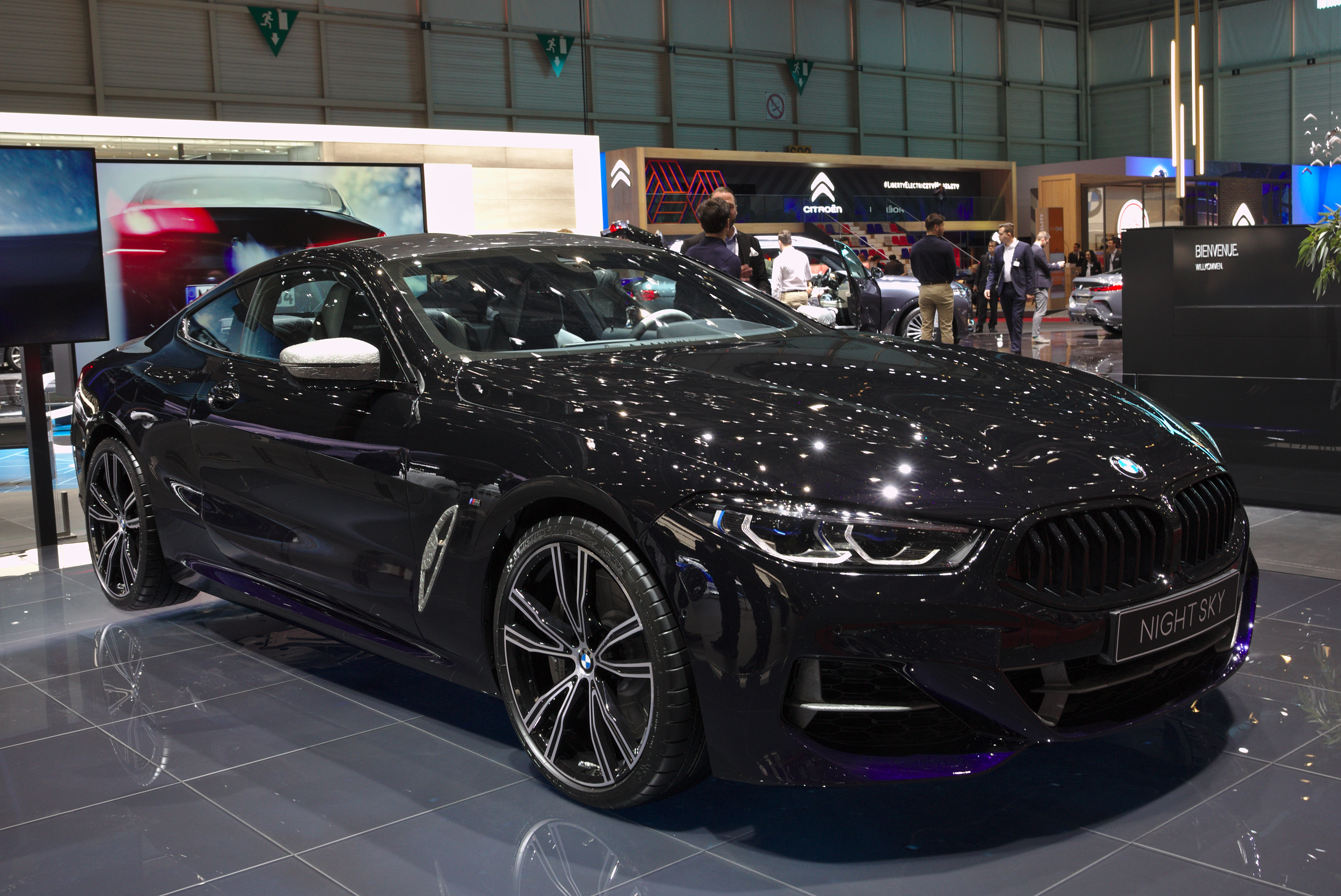
BMW M850i xDrive Coupé Night Sky Edition (G15)

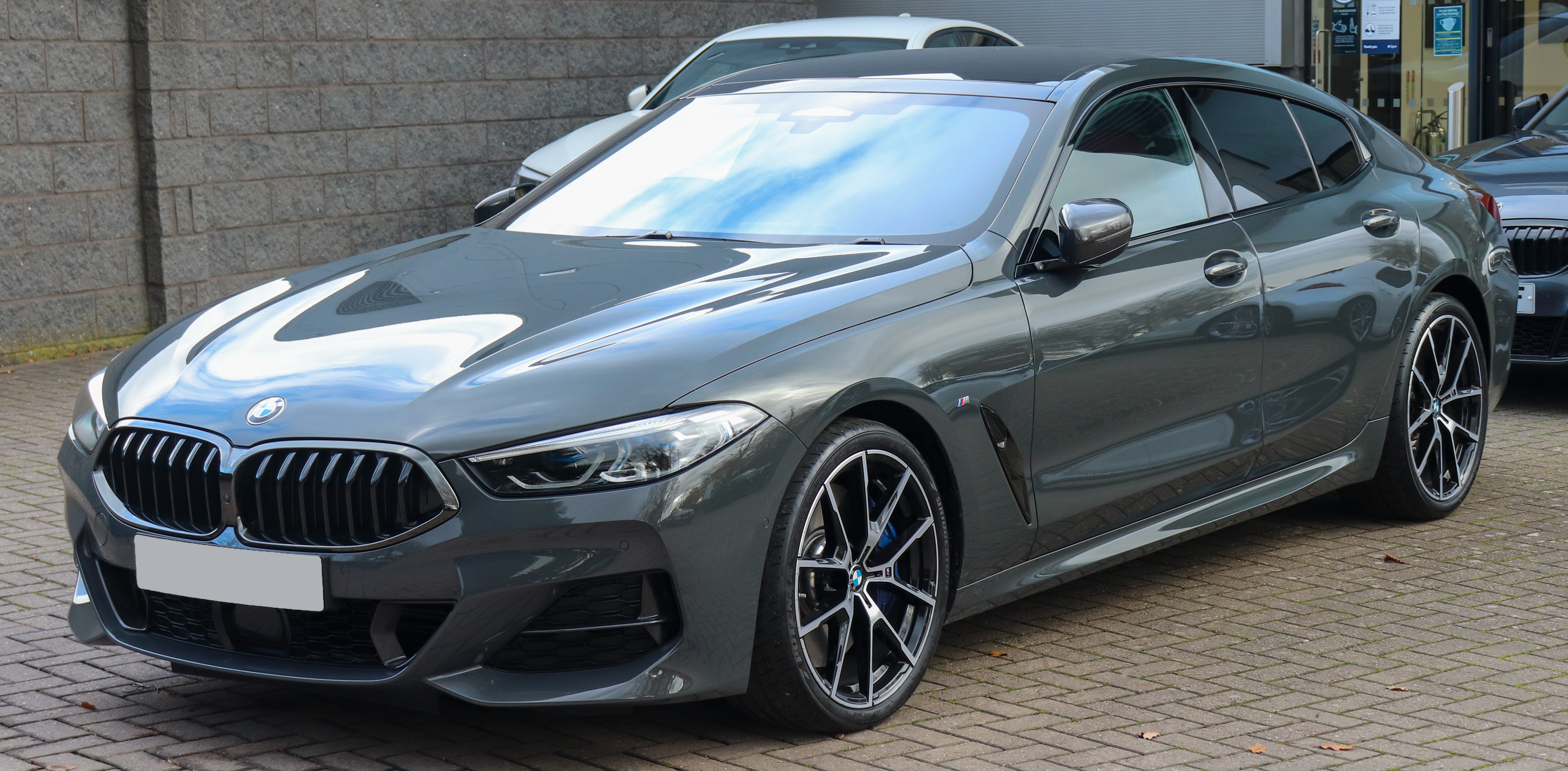
BMW 8 Series Gran Coupé (G16)

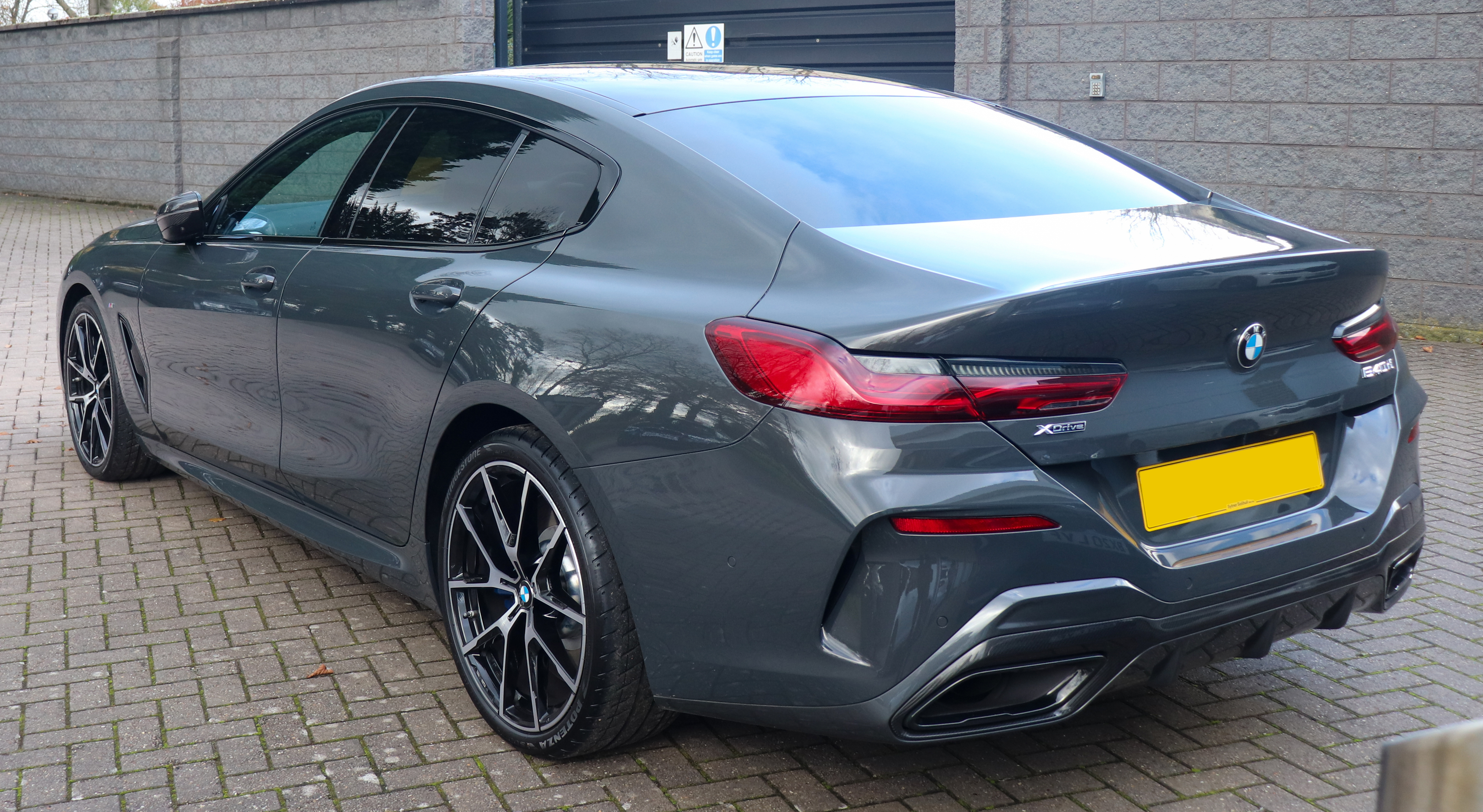
BMW 8 Series Gran Coupé (G16)

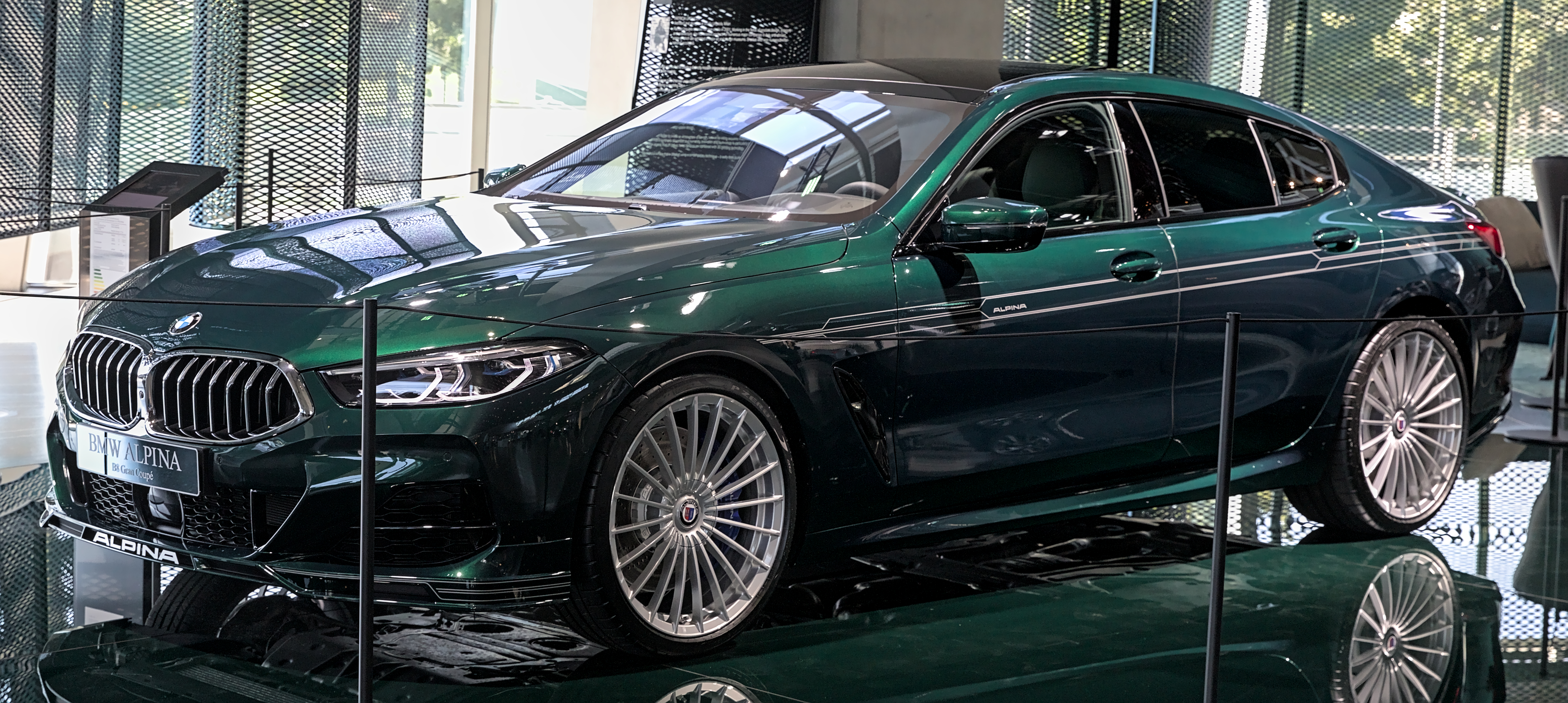
Alpina B8 Gran Coupé (G16)
