= Muonionalusta =

Octahedrite meteorite

Muonionalusta meteorite
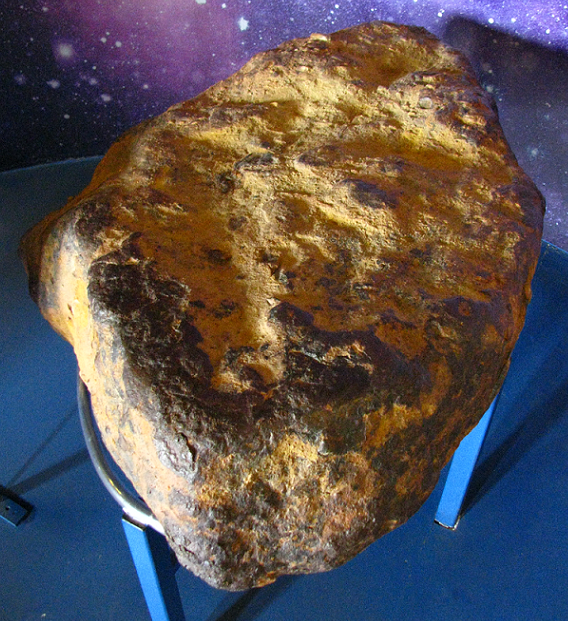
- The Muonionalusta meteorite, on loan to the Prague National Museum in 2010. It is the largest meteorite ever exhibited in the Czech Republic.
- Type: IVA (Of)
- Structural classification: Fine Octahedrite
- Class: Octahedrite
- Group: Iron
- Composition: Ni, Ga, Ge
- Country: Sweden
- Region: Norrbotten
- Coordinates: 67°48′N 23°6.8′E
- Observed fall: No
- Found date: 1906
- Strewn field: Yes
- Related media on Wikimedia Commons

The Muonionalusta meteorite (Finnish pronunciation: [ˈmuo̯nionˌɑlustɑ], Swedish pronunciation: [mʉˈǒːnɪɔnalːɵsta]) is a meteorite classified as fine octahedrite, type IVA (Of) which impacted in northern Sweden, near the border to Finland, about one million years BCE.

== History ==
The first fragment of the Muonionalusta meteorite was found in 1906 near the village of Kitkiöjärvi. Around forty pieces are known today, some being quite large. Other fragments have been found in a 25-by-15-kilometre (15.5 mi × 9.3 mi) area in the Pajala district of Norrbotten County, approximately 140 kilometres (87 mi) north of the Arctic Circle.

The meteorite was first described in 1910 by A. G. Högbom, who named it after the nearby place Muonionalusta on the Muonio River. It was studied in 1948 by Professor Nils Göran David Malmqvist. The Muonionalusta meteorite, probably the oldest known meteorite (4.5653 ± 0.0001 billion years), marks the first occurrence of stishovite in an iron meteorite.

The mineral muonionalustaite, a hydrated nickel chloride, was first found as a weathering product from a meteorite sample.

The name Muonionalusta is Finnish: it comes from the name Muonio (+ possessive particle -(o)n-) and alusta, which in this context means "a place below", i.e. downstream from Muonio.

== Description ==
Studies have shown it to be the oldest discovered meteorite impacting the Earth during the Quaternary Period, about one million years ago. It is quite clearly part of the iron core or mantle of a planetoid, which shattered into many pieces upon its fall on our planet. Since landing on Earth the meteorite has experienced four ice ages. It was unearthed from a glacial moraine in the northern tundra. It has a strongly weathered surface covered with cemented faceted pebbles.

== Composition ==
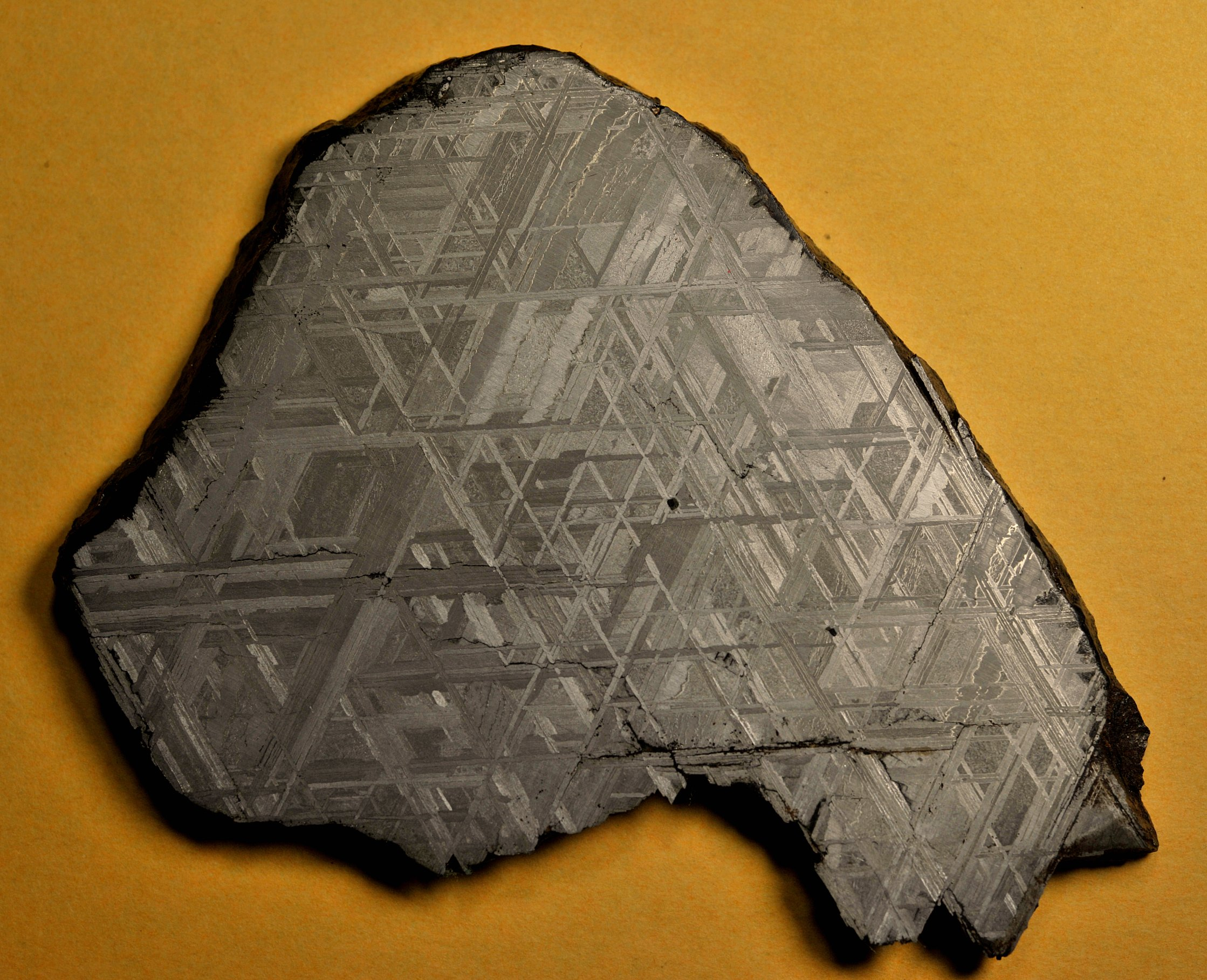
Slice (across 9.6 cm) of a Muonionalusta meteorite fragment, showing the Widmanstätten pattern.

New analysis of this strongly shock-metamorphosed iron meteorite has shown a content of 8.4% nickel and trace amounts of rare elements—0.33 ppm gallium, 0.133 ppm germanium and 1.6 ppm iridium. It also contains the minerals chromite, daubréelite, schreibersite, akaganéite and inclusions of troilite. For the first time, analysis has proved the presence of a form of quartz altered by extremely high pressure—stishovite, probably a pseudomorphosis after tridymite. From the article "First discovery of stishovite in an iron meteorite":

Stishovite, a high pressure polymorph of SiO_{2}, is an exceptionally rare mineral...and has only been found in association with a few meteorite impact structures.... Clearly, the meteoritic stishovite cannot have formed by isostatic pressure prevailing in the core of the parent asteroid.... One can safely assume then that stishovite formation (in the Muonionalusta meteorite) is connected with an impact event. The glass component might have formed directly as a shock melt....

A 2010 study reported the lead isotope dating in the Muonionalusta meteorite and concluded the stishovite was from an impact event hundreds of millions of years ago: "The presence of stishovite signifies that this meteorite was heavily shocked, possibly during the 0.4 Ga [billion years] old breakup event indicated by cosmic ray exposure...."

== Distribution ==
Fragments of the Muonionalusta meteorite are held by numerous institutions around the world.

- Prague Observatory and Planetarium, Štefánik's Observatory, Czech Republic, 950 kg.
- Moldavite Museum, Český Krumlov, Czech Republic, 21,25 kg.
- Observatory and Planetarium Brno, Czech Republic, 21 kg.
- Geological Institute, Uppsala, 15 kilograms (33 lb).
- Vernadsky State Geological Museum, Moscow 2404 g.
- North Carolina Museum of Natural Sciences, Raleigh, 2177 g.
- Naturhistorisches Museum, Vienna, 96 g.
- Museum für Naturkunde, Berlin, 82 g.
- Max Planck Institute, Mainz, 96.3 g.
- Paneth Collection (also at the Max Planck Institute), Mainz, 142.5 g.
- National Museum of Natural History, Washington, 197 g.
- American Museum of Natural History, New York, 84 g.
- Field Museum of Natural History, Chicago, 65.2 g.
- University of California, Los Angeles, 55 g.
- Meteorite Museum, Riga, 48.7 g.

A part of the meteorite is used in the 25-pieces limited Rolls-Royce Tranquility Collection (Phantom VIII) Controller and in the M850i xDrive Coupé Night Sky Edition by BMW.

In 2021, Poland's Germania Mint released a numismatic coin named Impact Moments: Meteorite that depicts the extinction of dinosaurs as a result of a meteorite hitting the earth. Each coin has a fragment of the Muonionalusta meteorite embedded in it.

In 2026, Swiss watchmaker Delma released the Midland Meteorite Automatic, a 100-piece limited edition featuring dials made from the meteorite.

== See also ==
- Glossary of meteoritics

=== References ===
- Malmqvist, David (1948). Structure of the Muonionalusta iron meteorite and a method of determining the orientation of lamellae of octahedrites. Uppsala: Almquist & Wiksells. OCLC 494672409.
