= BMW M8 =

High-performance version of the BMW 8 Series

BMW M8 (F91/F92/F93)
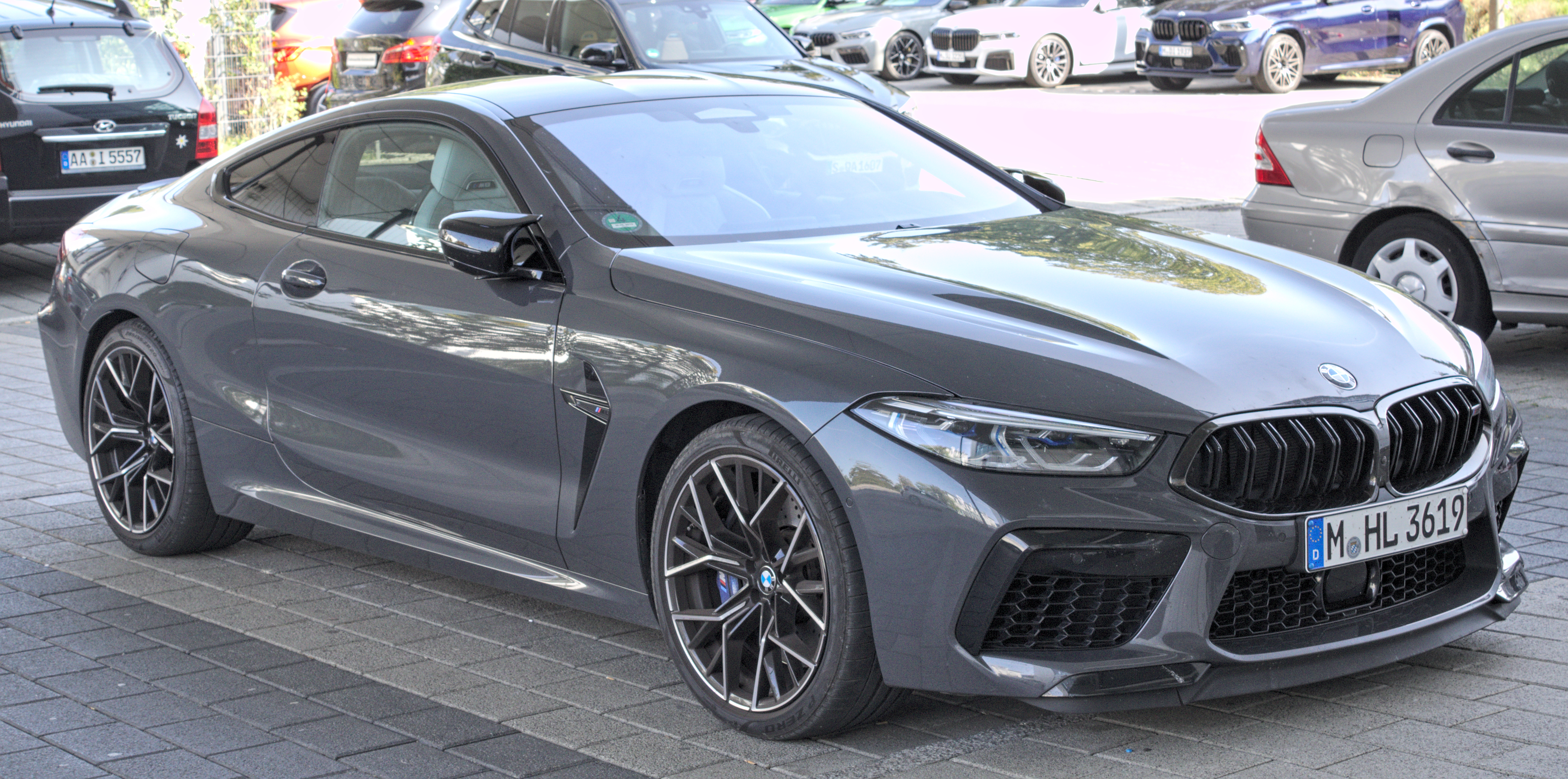

Overview
- Manufacturer: BMW M
- Production: July 2019– October 2025
- Model years: 2019–2025
- Assembly: Germany: Dingolfing
- Designer: Marcus Syring, Jacek Pepłowski

Body and chassis
- Class: Grand tourer (S) (Coupé/Convertible); Executive car (E) (Gran Coupé)
- Body style: 2-door convertible (F91); 2-door coupé (F92); 4-door sedan (F93)
- Platform: BMW CLAR platform
- Related: BMW 8 Series (G14/G15/G16); BMW XM

Powertrain
- Engine: Petrol: 4.4 L S63 twin-turbo V8
- Transmission: 8-speed ZF 8HP automatic

Dimensions
- Wheelbase: F91/F92: 2,822 mm (111 in); F93: 3,023 mm (119 in)
- Length: 4,867–5,098 mm (191.6–200.7 in)
- Width: 1,907–1,943 mm (75.1–76.5 in)
- Height: 1,341–1,399 mm (52.8–55.1 in)
- Curb weight: 1,885–2,032 kg (4,156–4,480 lb)

Chronology
- Predecessor: BMW M6 (F06/F12/F13)

The BMW M8 is the high-performance version of the BMW 8 Series (G15) marketed under the BMW M sub-brand.

Introduced in June 2019, the M8 was initially produced in the 2-door convertible (F91 model code) and 2-door coupe (F92 model code) body styles. A 4-door sedan (F93 model code, marketed as 'Gran Coupe') body style was added to the lineup in October 2019. The M8 is powered by the BMW S63 twin-turbocharged V8 engine shared with the BMW M5 (F90).

== Development and launch ==
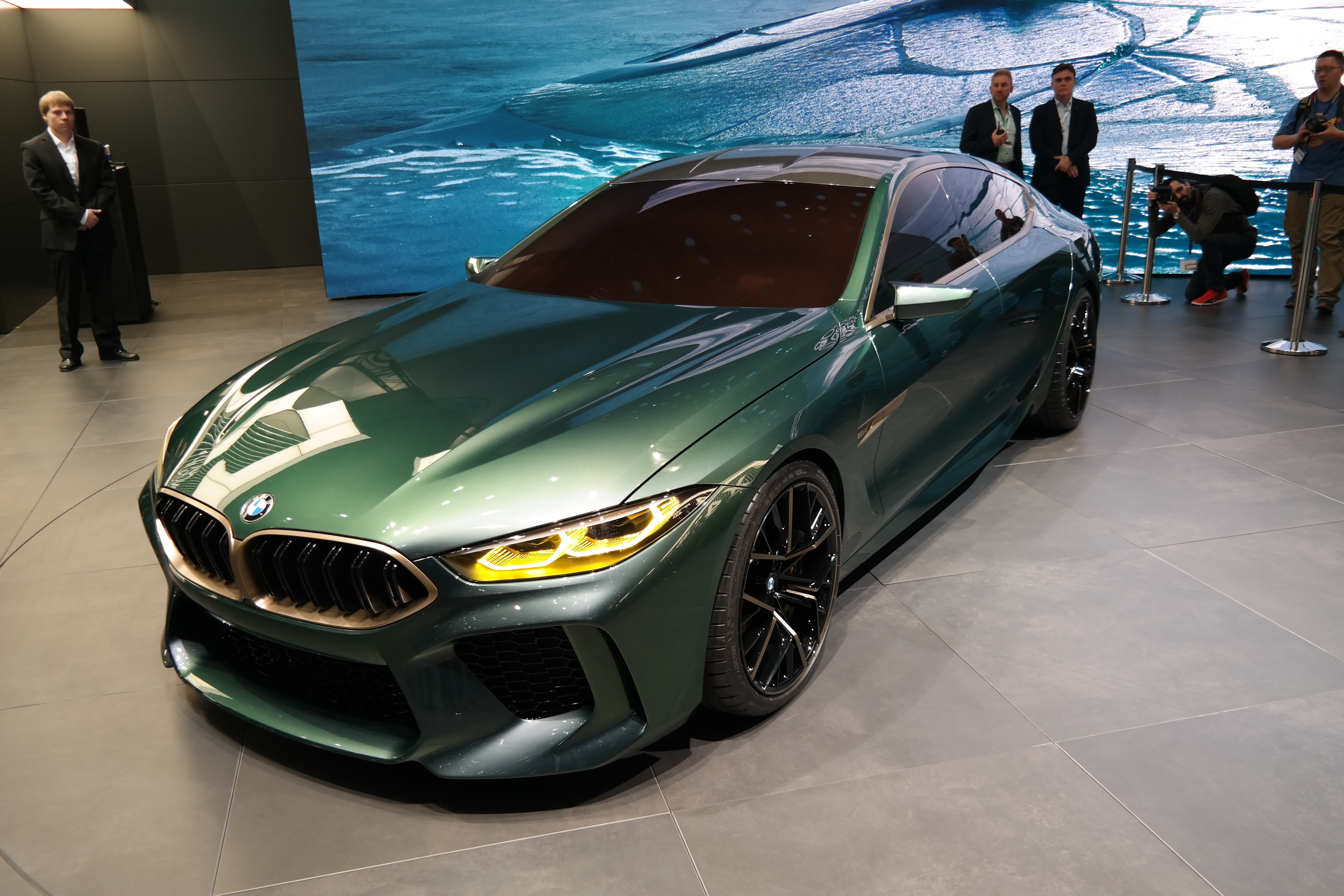
BMW M8 Gran Coupé Concept

BMW revived the 8 Series nameplate by introducing the M8 GTE racecar (a first by BMW, as the brand usually introduces the production version first), which replaced the M6 GTLM at the end of the 2017 season of the IMSA WeatherTech SportsCar Championship, leading to speculation about a production equivalent to the racing car. At the 2018 Geneva Motor Show, BMW introduced the M8 Gran Coupé Concept, which previewed a high performance four-door variant of the Concept 8 Series introduced alongside the M8 GTE at the 2017 Frankfurt Motor Show. The design of the concept was based on the M8 GTE and sported aggressive M performance visual parts. Prototypes of the M8 began testing in June 2017 when another Concept of the 8 Series was unveiled to the public.

Development of the M8 continued into 2018 and more production ready prototypes were made available to the automotive press for review. The car was finally introduced online on 4 June 2019 in the high performance "Competition" variation in coupé and convertible bodystyles. Production began in August 2019.

== Specifications ==
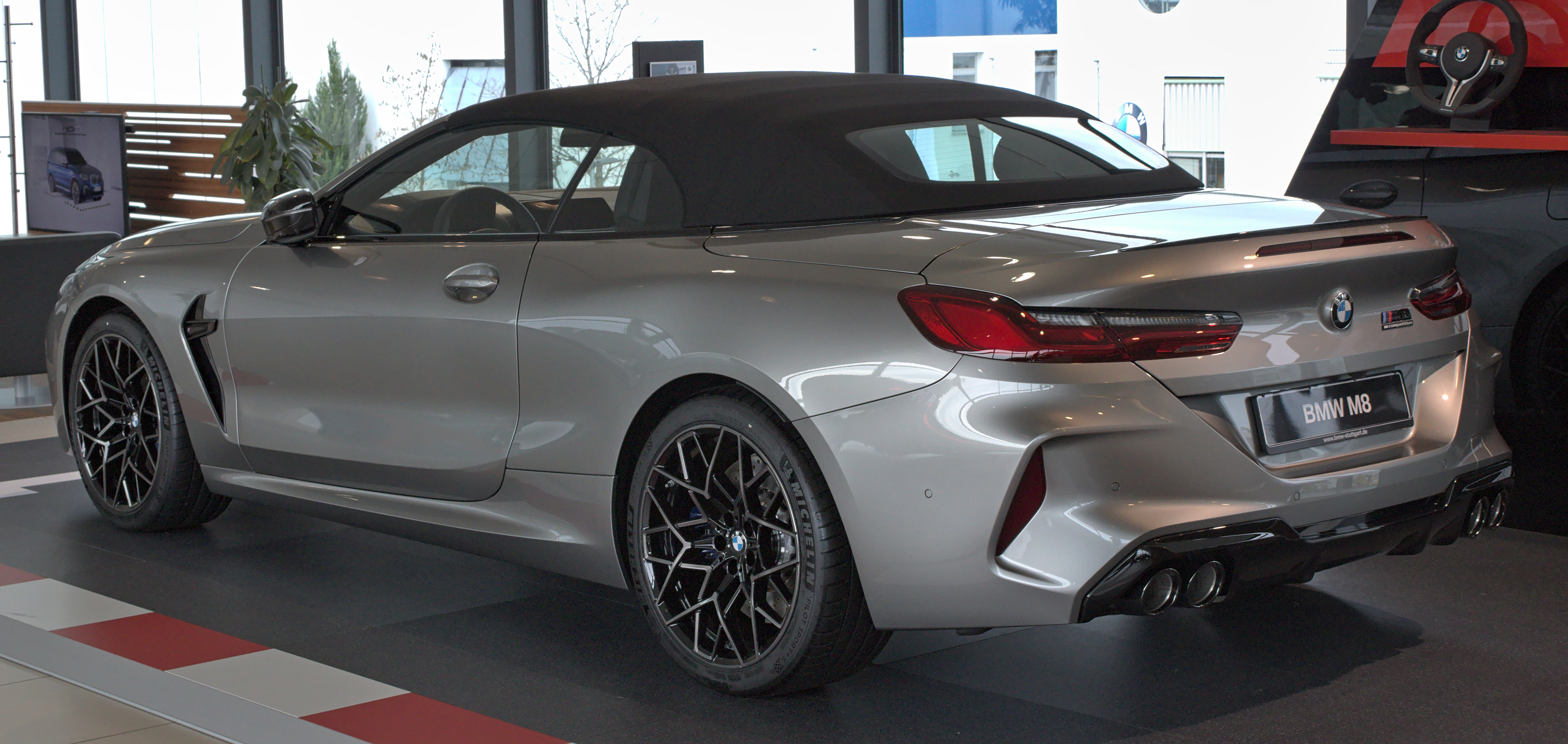
F91 Convertible

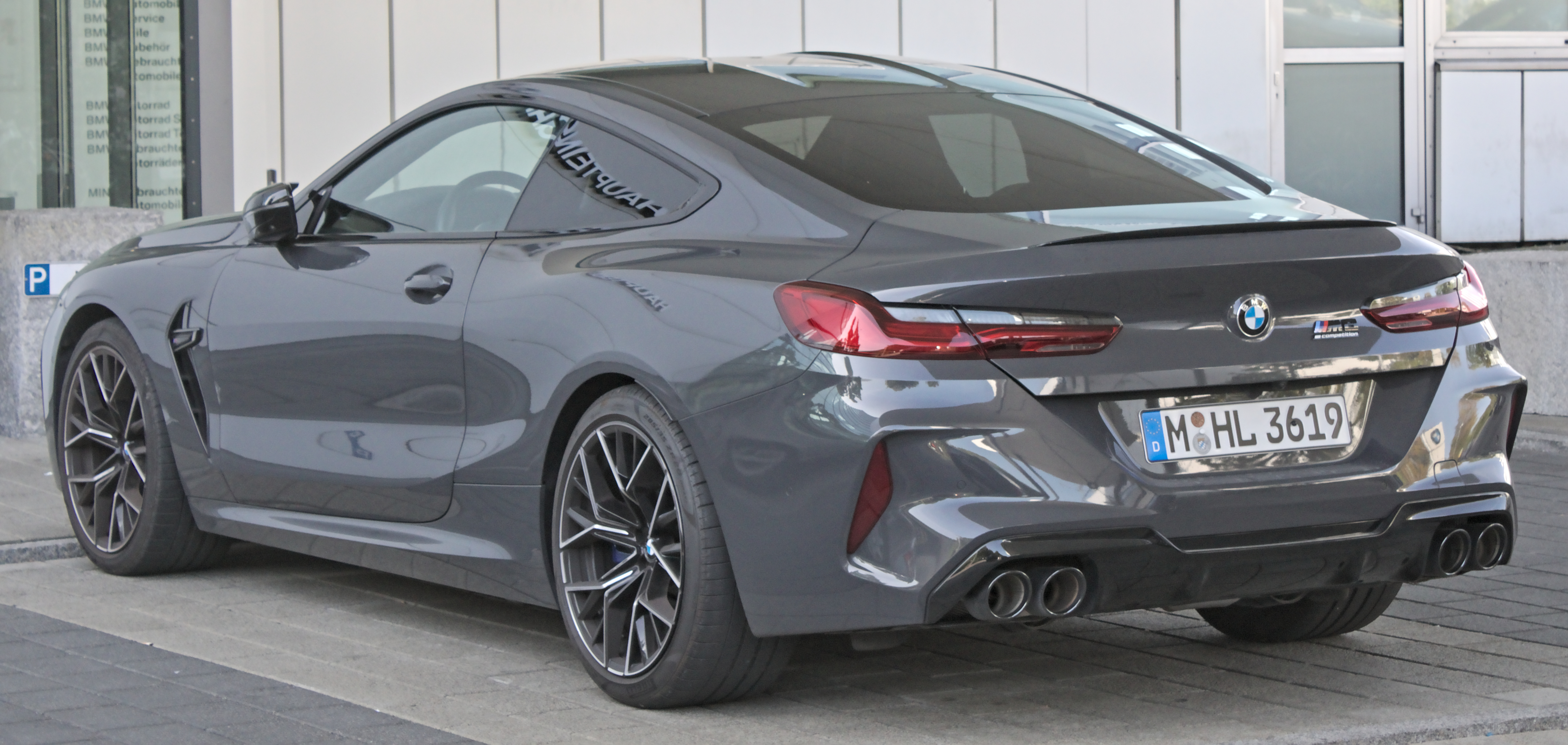
F92 Coupé

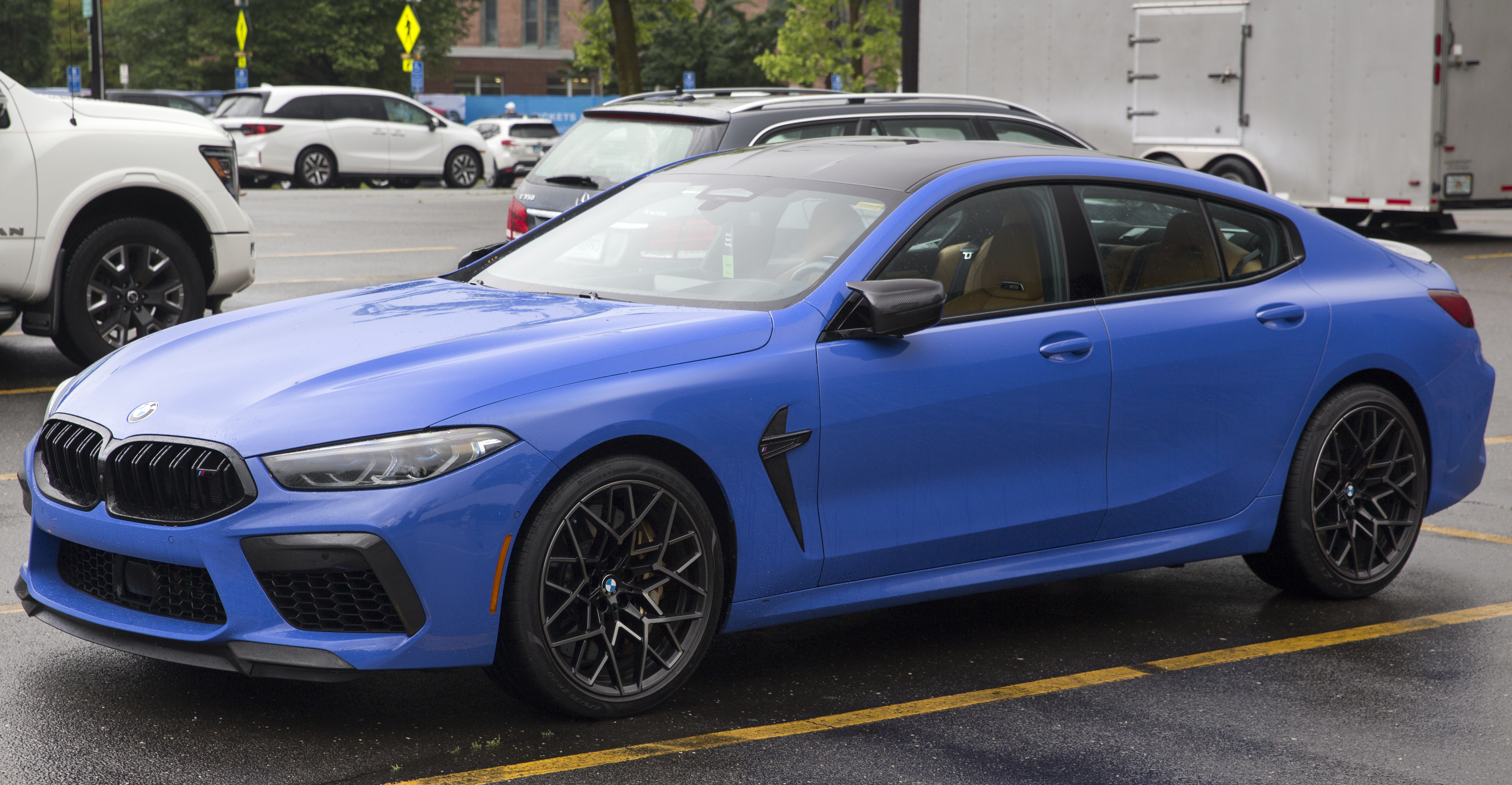
F93 Gran Coupé

The M8 is based on the BMW CLAR platform, with strut and wishbone suspension at the front and multi-link suspension at the rear. Adaptive dampers are standard equipment. The all-wheel-drive system (called xDrive) has the ability to decouple its front axle to make the car purely rear-wheel-drive, a feature first introduced on the M5.

The M8 is powered by a version of the BMW S63 twin-turbocharged V8 engine which is shared with the M5, X5M and X6M models. This engine is rated at 441 kW (600 PS; 591 hp) at 6,000 rpm and 750 N⋅m (553 lb⋅ft) in the standard M8 model, with peak power increasing to 460 kW (625 PS; 617 hp) at 6,000 rpm for the M8 Competition model – torque remains the same. The sole transmission available for the M8 is an 8-speed torque converter ZF 8HP76 automatic transmission manufactured by ZF Friedrichshafen called the "M-Steptronic" by BMW and also shared with the F90 M5.

The standard brakes consist of iron discs, with carbon ceramic brakes being optional. The level of power assist for the brakes can be set to either ‘comfort’ or ‘sport’ mode using the iDrive controller, a feature which has been criticised for resulting in inconsistent brake pedal feel.

The "M8 Competition" is the upper model of the range, with changes including increased engine power, a modified induction system and more rigid engine mounts. The unladen kerb weight of 2019 M8 Competition model sold in the United Kingdom is 1,885 kg (4,156 lb) for the coupé and 2,010 kg (4,431 lb) for the convertible.

The M8 can be fitted with M Performance Parts. These include a sport steering wheel, carbon fibre parts, side skirts, M rims and a bigger spoiler.

== Performance ==
Performance figures include a 0–100 km/h (62 mph) acceleration time of 3.2 seconds, 0–200 km/h (124 mph) acceleration time of 10.8 seconds (10.6 seconds for the M8 Competition) and a limited top speed of 264 km/h (164 mph). The top speed can be raised to 305 km/h (190 mph) with the optional M Driver's package which also adds high speed rated tyres to the car.

== Motorsport ==
=== M8 GTE ===
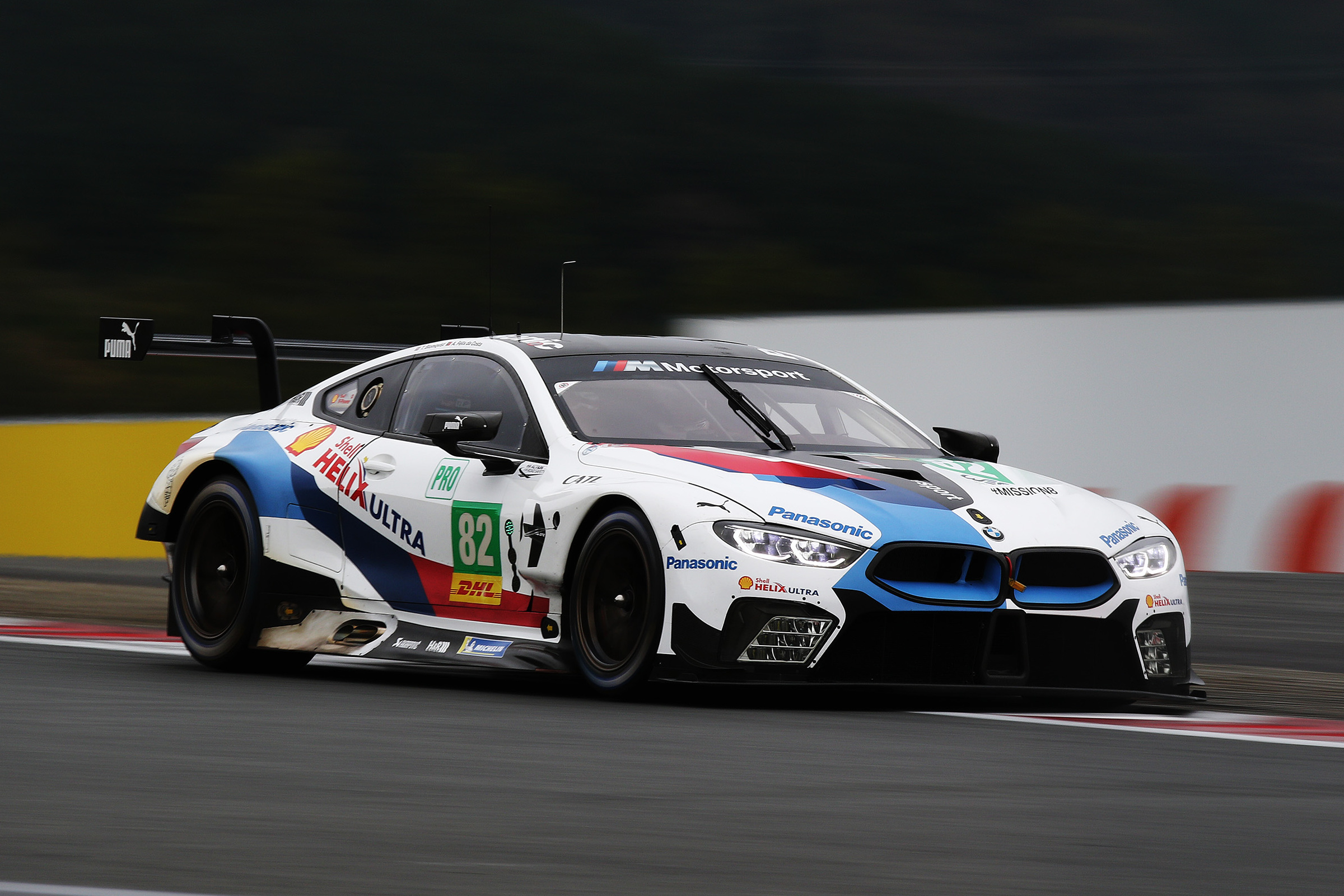
BMW M8 GTE

The racing version of the M8 called the M8 GTE was introduced at the 2017 Frankfurt Motor Show. The car made its competitive debut at the 2018 WeatherTech SportsCar Championship and the FIA WEC for the 2018 season marking BMW's return to Le Mans after 6 years.

=== M8 Safety car ===
In 2019, during the MotoGP Austrian Grand Prix, the M8 Competition made its debut as the official safety car.
