= Alpina B5 (E60) =

BMW 5 series variant manufactured by Alpina

Alpina B5 (E61)
- Alpina B5 'Touring' (wagon)

Overview
- Manufacturer: Alpina Burkard Bovensiepen GmbH & Co. KG
- Production: 2005–2011
- Assembly: Germany: Buchloe

Body and chassis
- Class: Executive car (E)
- Body style: 4-door saloon (E60); 5-door station wagon (E61)
- Layout: Front-engine, rear-wheel-drive
- Related: BMW 5 Series (E60); Alpina B7 (E65); Alpina B6 (E63)

Powertrain
- Engine: 4.4 L Alpina H1 (BMW N62) supercharged V8
- Transmission: 6-speed ZF 6HP automatic

Dimensions
- Wheelbase: 2,890 mm (114 in)
- Length: 4,843 mm (191 in)
- Width: 1,850 mm (73 in)
- Height: 1,470–1,491 mm (58–59 in)
- Kerb weight: Saloon: 1,720 kg (3,792 lb); Wagon: 1,810 kg (3,990 lb)

Chronology
- Predecessor: Alpina B10 (E39)
- Successor: Alpina B5 (F10)

The Alpina B5 (E60) is the first generation of the Alpina B5 high performance executive car manufactured by German automobile manufacturer Alpina from 2005 to 2011. Based on the BMW 5 Series (E60), the car was available in saloon and wagon body styles. The car succeeds the Alpina B10.

== Overview ==
The B5 is based on the 545i and uses a modified version of its 4.4-litre Valvetronic V8 engine designated by Alpina as the H1 (shared with the B7 and B6). Changes to the engine include an Alpina specific block made by Steyr, a forged crankshaft and low compression Mahle pistons. The engine retains the Valvetronic system and uses a centrifugal-type supercharger, made by ASA to Alpina's specifications the supercharger is belt-driven by the crankshaft and has a boost pressure of about 0.8 bar (11.7 psi). The supercharger was added to eliminate lag in power delivery during everyday use. This compressor system is also called "Turbessor", because it's able to combine the advantages of turbocharger and supercharger. At low rotational speeds, the boost system responds spontaneously like a conventional supercharger, but can also instantly delivers the boost pressure of a turbocharger. This behaviour is possible thanks to the particular layout, where the intake system has a throttle valve located at the air inlet of the compressor, so it's possible to control the boost pressure, maintaining it at a preset level over a large rpm range. In this way the engine is able to deliver an excellent torque at low and medium rotational speeds and a considerable amount of horsepower at high rpms. The modified engine has a power output of 500 PS (368 kW; 493 hp) at 5,500 rpm and 700 N⋅m (516 lb⋅ft) from 4,250 to 5,250 rpm. The engine has a red-line of 6,000 rpm.

The car uses a 6-speed "Switch Tronic" transmission manufactured by ZF Friedrichshafen. The transmission has a manual over-ride mode in which gears are shifted by buttons on the steering wheel. The B5 does not come with a limited slip differential as standard, but was instead offered as an option.

The B5 comes with 19-inch forged multi-spoke alloy wheels and Michelin Pilot Sport 2 tyres measuring 245/40 ZR19 at the front and 275/35 ZR19 at the rear. The B5 has Alpina's own suspension system designed to give a soft ride in normal driving conditions. The brakes used on the car were taken from the Middle-Eastern specification 760Li.

Exterior changes over a regular 5 Series included a front chin spoiler with Alpina lettering and optional Alpina pinstripes on the exterior paint. The interior came standard with Lavalina leather upholstery, wood trim, BMW iDrive system, Alpina gauges, perforated Alpina sports seats and Alpina badging throughout. The interior was fully customisable by the Alpina interior department.

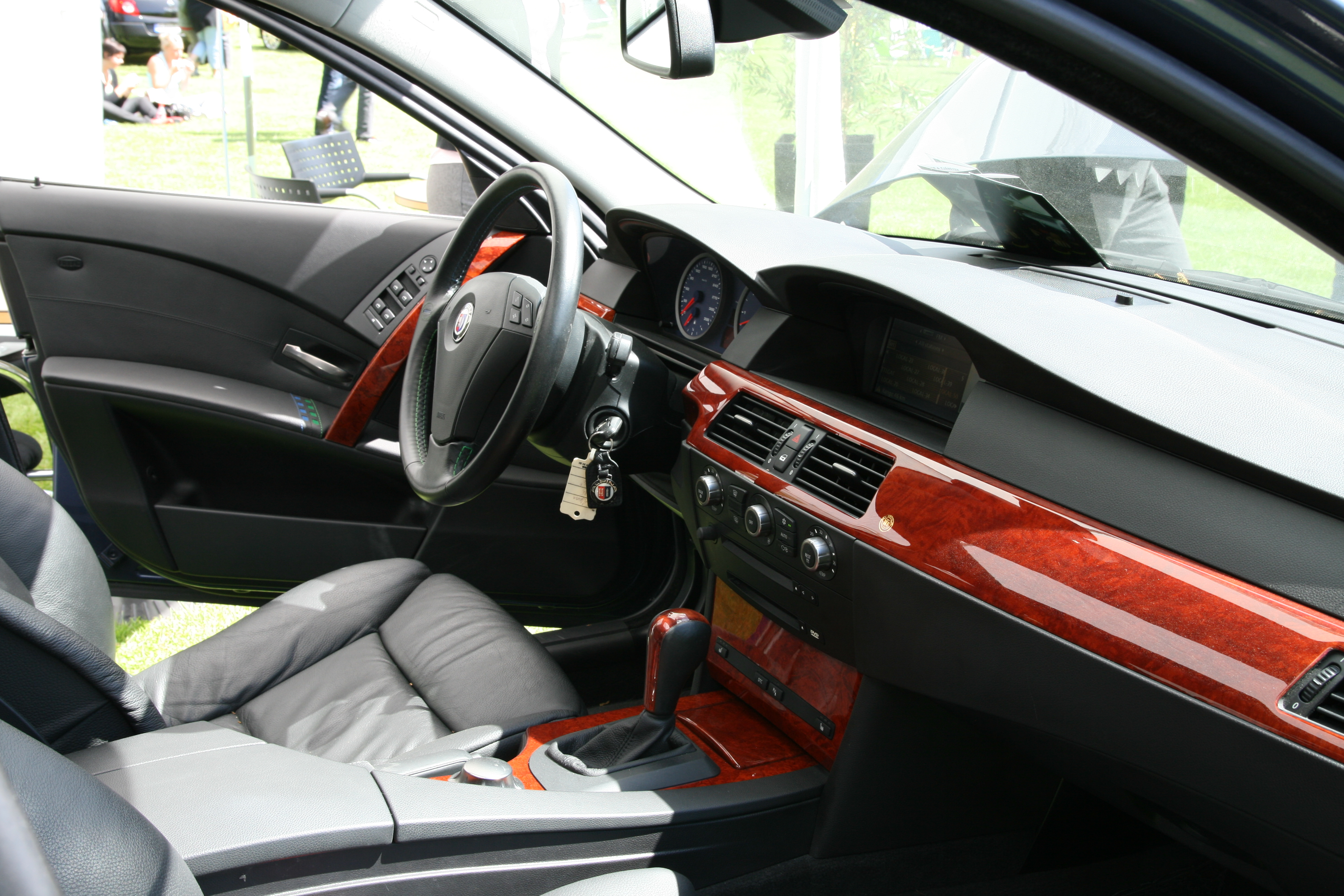
Interior

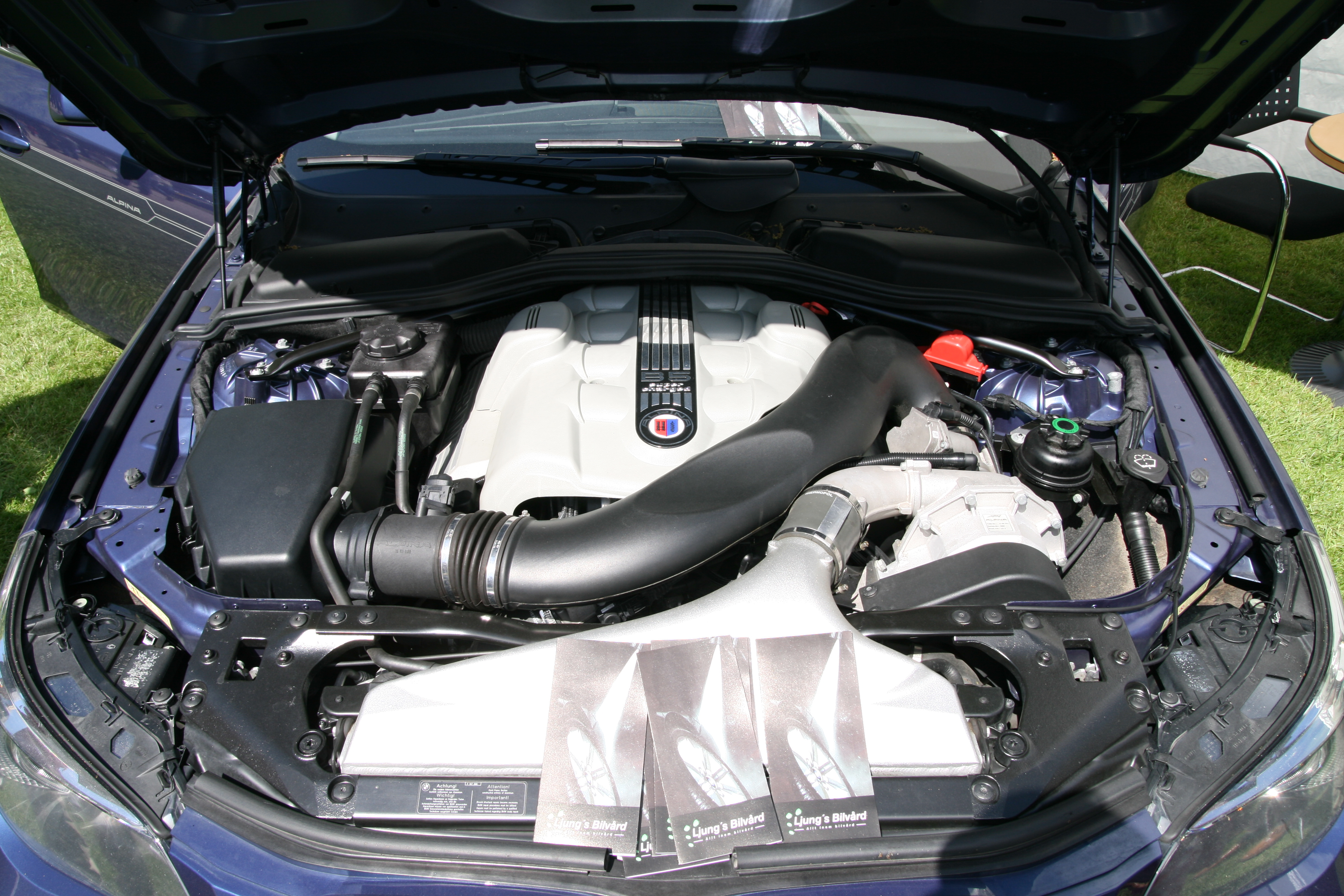
The 4.4-litre Alpina H1 supercharged V8 engine

== Performance ==
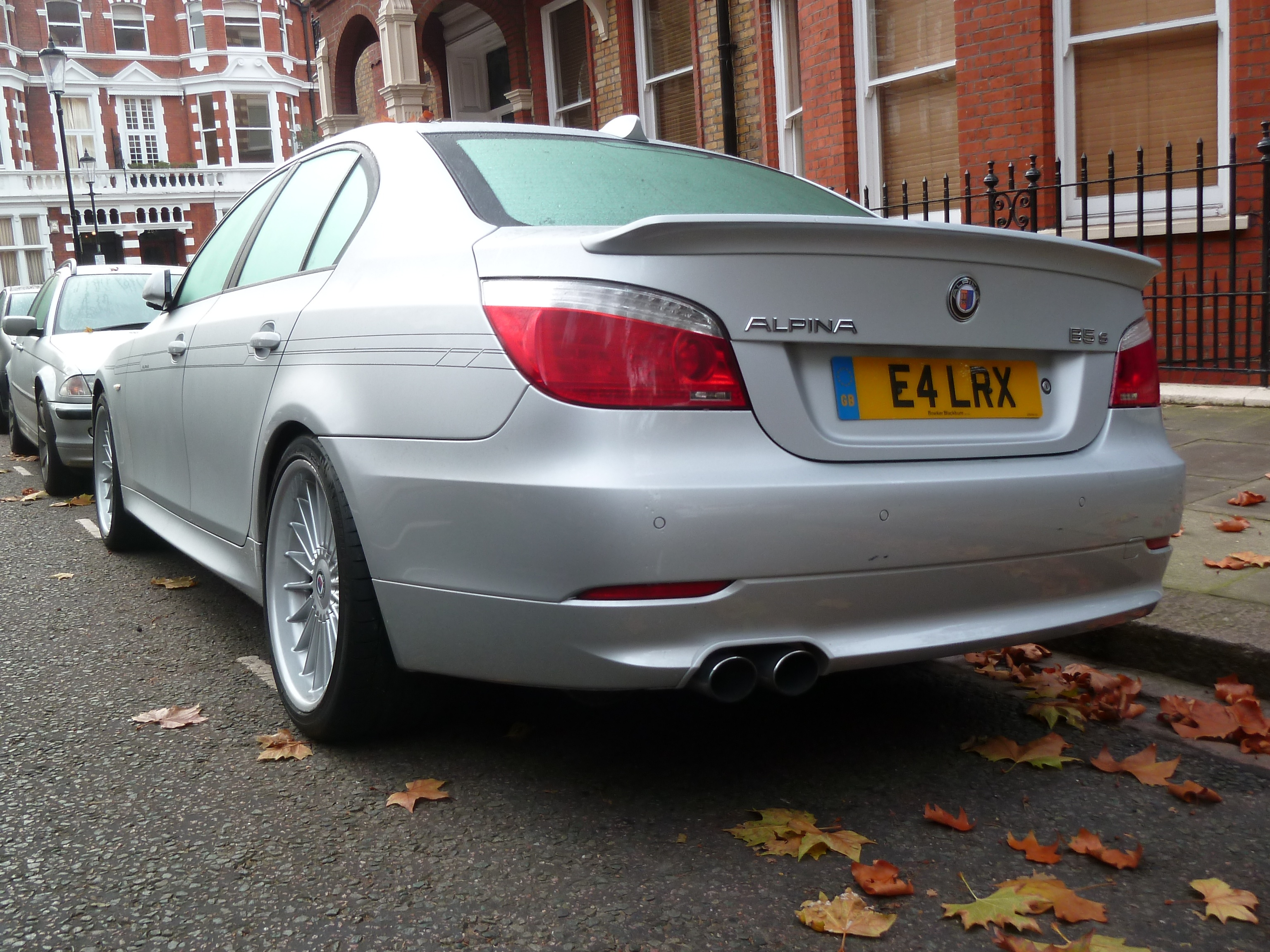
Rear view (saloon)

The tested performance figures for the B5 include a 0–100 km/h (0–62 mph) acceleration time of 4.6 seconds, 0–161 km/h (0–100 mph) acceleration time of 9.5 seconds, 0–201 km/h (0–125 mph) acceleration time of 14.5 seconds and a top speed of 314 km/h (195 mph).

== B5 S ==
Alpina B5 S wagon

Introduced in 2008, the B5 S is a high performance variant of the B5. The B5 S has a further upgraded engine having a power output of 530 PS (390 kW; 523 hp) at 5,500 rpm and 724 N⋅m (534 lb⋅ft) of torque at 4,750 rpm. The electronic damper control system (EDC) of the standard B5 was recalibrated and came with Comfort and Sport settings. It came with 20-inch multi-spoke alloy wheels and Michelin Pilot Sport tyres for increased grip. Claimed performance figures for the car include a standing kilometre time of 22.1 seconds, a 0–60 mph (0–97 km/h) acceleration time of 4.6 seconds and a top speed of 317 km/h (197 mph).
