= Alpina B6 (E63) =

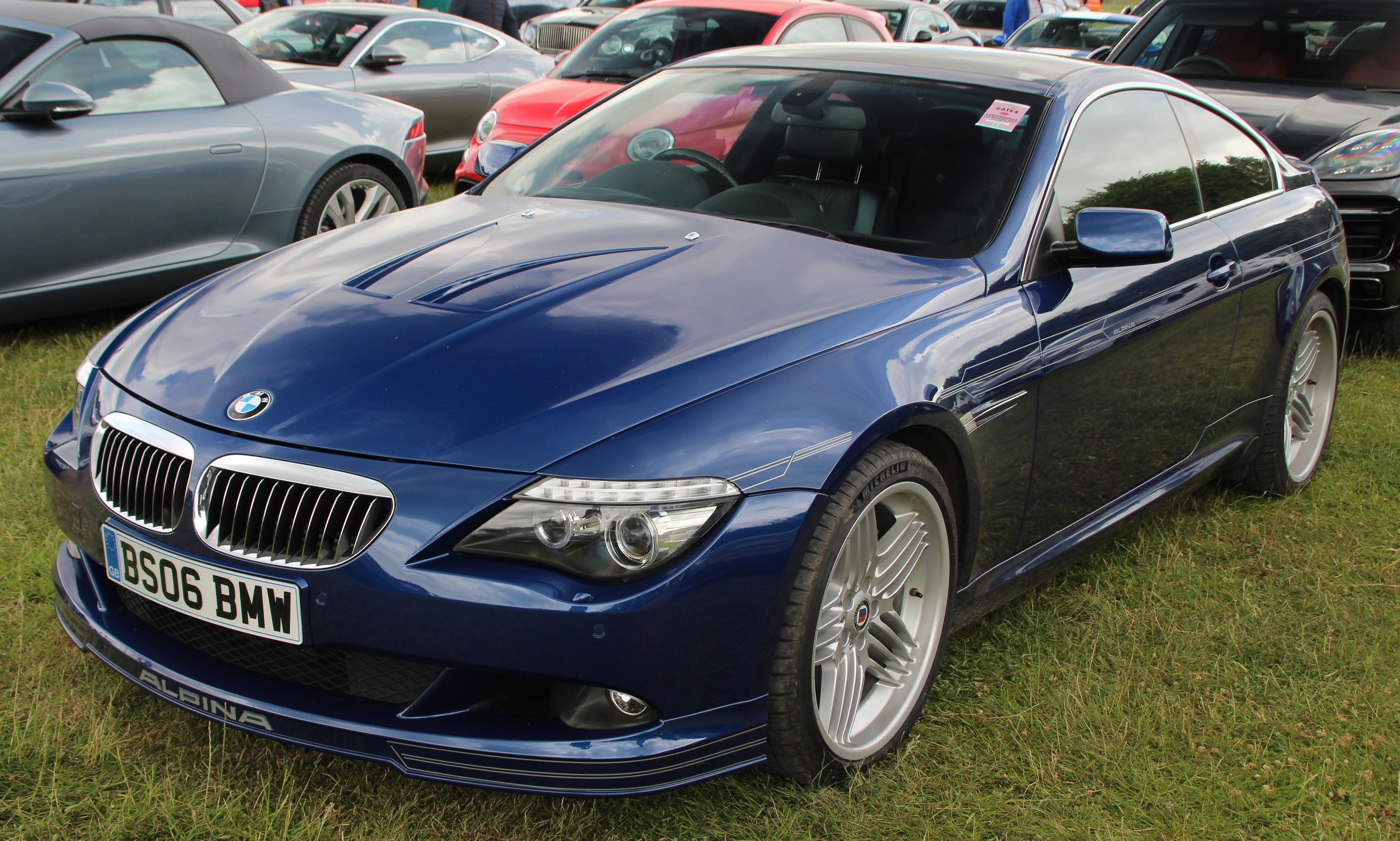
- Alpina B6 S (E63)

Overview
- Manufacturer: Alpina Burkard Bovensiepen GmbH & Co. KG
- Production: 2005–2010
- Assembly: Germany: Buchloe

Body and chassis
- Class: Grand tourer (S)
- Body style: 2-door coupé 2-door convertible
- Layout: Front-engine, rear-wheel-drive
- Related: BMW 6 Series (E63); Alpina B7 (E65); Alpina B5 (E60)

Powertrain
- Engine: 4.4 L H1 supercharged V8
- Transmission: 6-speed ZF 6HP automatic

Dimensions
- Wheelbase: 2,870 mm (113.0 in)
- Length: 4,820 mm (189.8 in)
- Width: 1,855 mm (73.0 in)
- Height: 1,371 mm (54.0 in)
- Kerb weight: Coupé: 1,720 kg (3,792 lb); Convertible: 1,930 kg (4,255 lb)

Chronology
- Predecessor: Alpina B6 (E21)
- Successor: Alpina B6 (F12)

The Alpina B6 (E63) is the second generation of the high performance grand tourer manufactured by German automobile manufacturer Alpina from 2005 to 2010. Based on the BMW 6 Series (E63), the car was available in coupé and convertible bodystyles. The B6 was introduced in 2005.

== Development and introduction ==
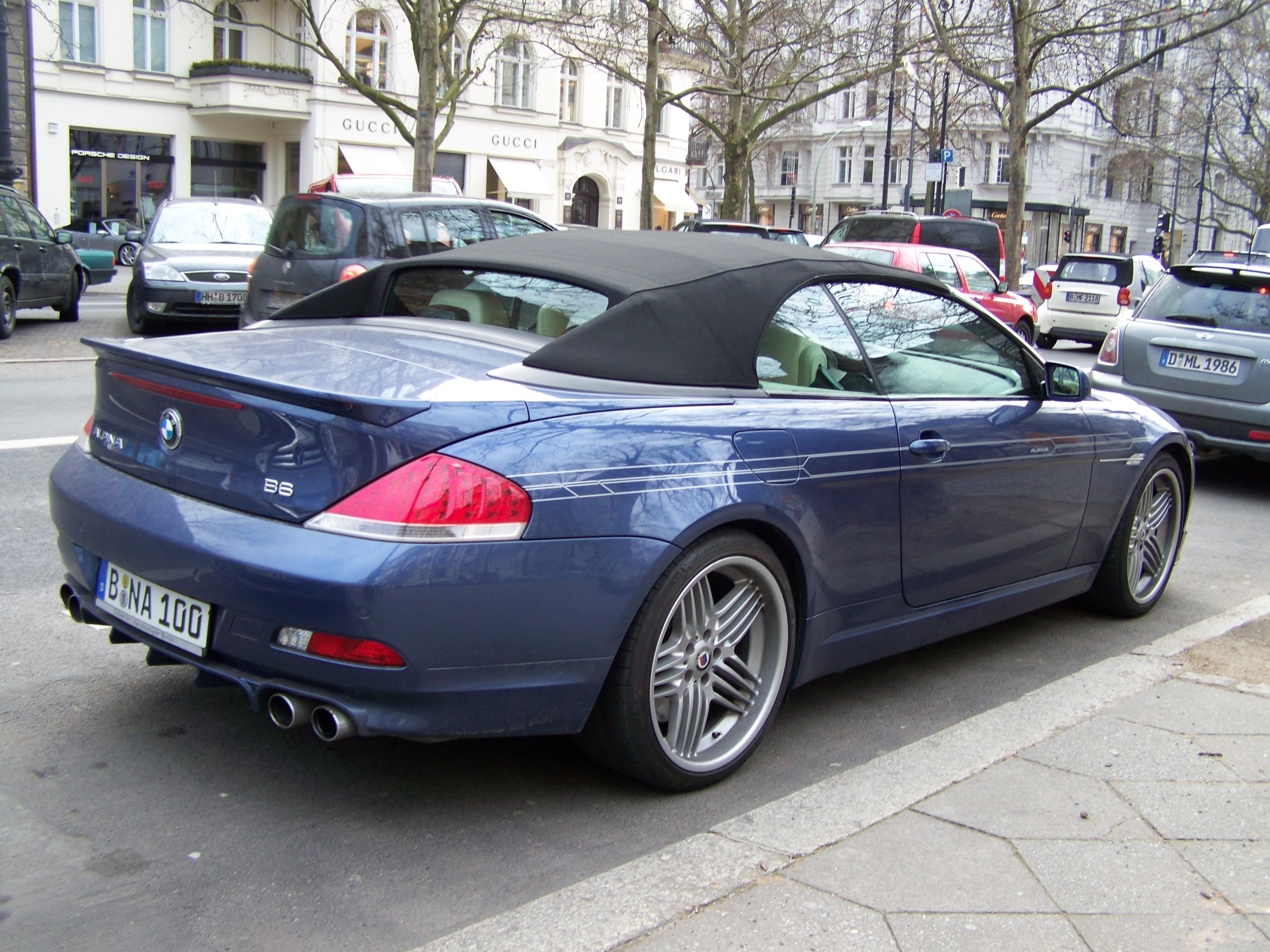
Alpina B6 (E64)

The B6 is based on the 650i and uses a modified version of its 4.4-litre N62 V8 engine, designated by Alpina as the H1 (shared with the B5 and B7). Changes to the engine include an Alpina specific block made by Steyr, a forged crankshaft and low compression Mahle pistons. The engine retains BMW's VANOS system and uses a centrifugal-type supercharger, made by ASA to Alpina's specifications and a stainless steel Akrapovic exhaust system with quad exhaust tips. These modifications allow the engine to generate 500 PS (368 kW; 493 hp) at 5,500 rpm and 700 N⋅m (516 lb⋅ft) of torque at 4,250 rpm. The choice of the forced induction V8 engine over the naturally aspirated V10 engine of the M6 grants the B6 better fuel economy figures.

The engine is mated to a 6-speed ZF automatic transmission which is claimed to be more efficient than the SMG transmission found on the M6. The transmission has a full automatic mode and a manual shifting mode, called Switch Tronic. The control system was first introduced by the company in 1993, and allows the driver to change gears via two buttons located on the back of the steering wheel. The car came standard with a limited slip differential on the coupé while it was available as an option on the convertible.

The B6 has Alpina's own suspension system designed to give a soft ride in normal driving conditions, thus maintaining the grand touring nature of the car. The B6 came with the Alpina Dynamic 20-inch alloy wheels (sets of 4-spokes in a 5-spoke arrangement).

The brakes used on the car were taken from the Middle-Eastern specification 760Li. The tyres are Michelin pilot sport units, measuring 255/35 ZR20 at the front and 285/30 ZR20 at the rear. Exterior changes over a regular 6 Series included a front chin spoiler with Alpina lettering, optional Alpina pinstripes on the exterior paint and a new rear diffuser.

The interior came standard with Lavalina leather upholstery, wood trim, BMW iDrive system, Alpina gauges and Alpina badging throughout. The interior was fully customisable by the Alpina interior department.

The B6's body in white was prepared at BMW's Dingolfing plant and was then sent to the Alpina factory in Buchloe for final assembly.

== Performance ==
The B6 can accelerate from 0–97 km/h (0–60 mph) in 4.5 seconds 0–161 km/h (0–100 mph) in 9.9 seconds and can attain a top speed of 311 km/h (193 mph). The car takes 22.8 seconds to accelerate to its top speed from a standstill.

== Variants ==
=== B6 S ===
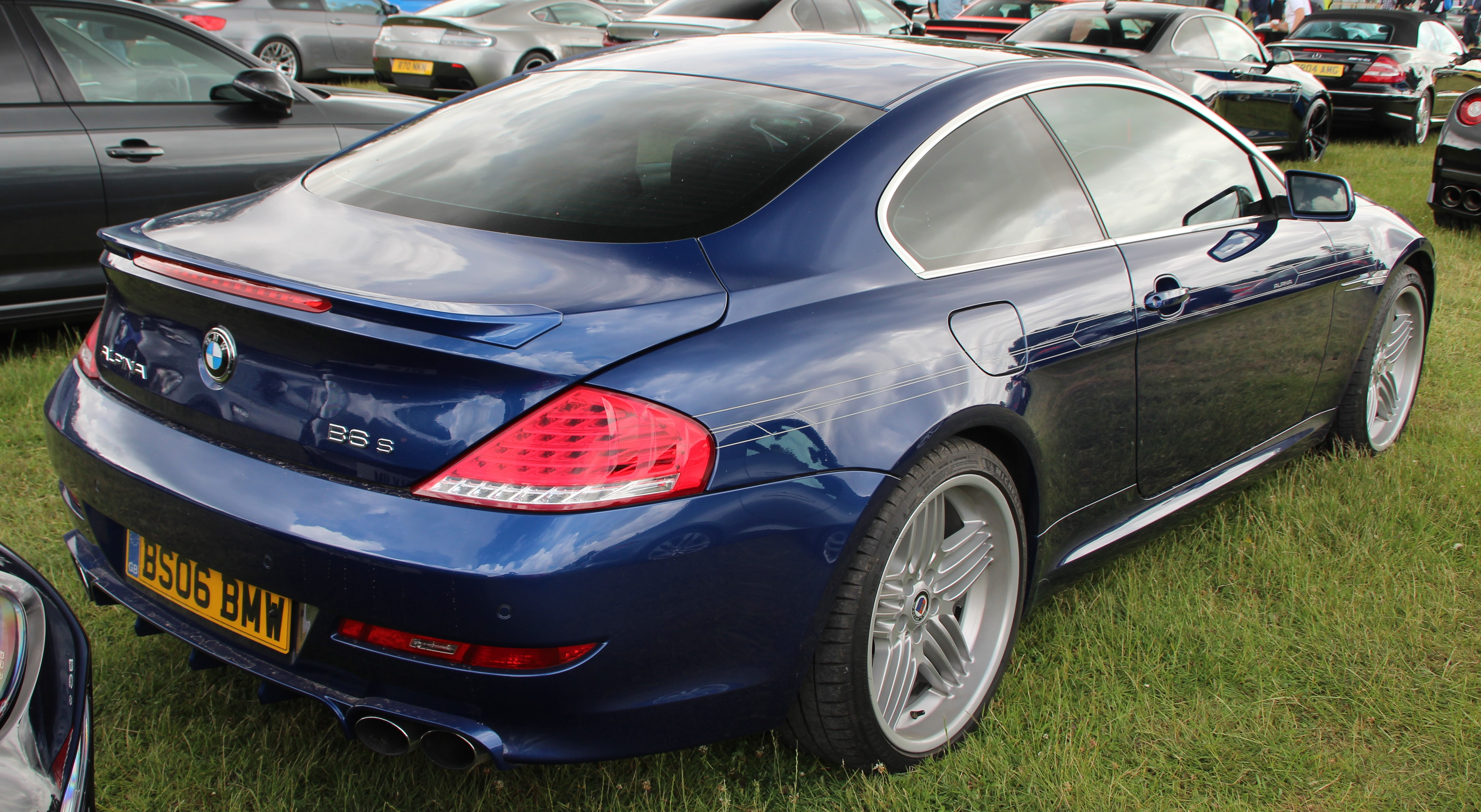
Alpina B6 S rear

The B6 S is a high performance variant of the B6. Introduced in 2008, the car received further improvements over the B6, this allowed the engine to generate a maximum power output of 530 PS (390 kW; 523 hp) and 725 N⋅m (535 lb⋅ft) of torque. The increase in power was achieved by tweaking the variable valve timing on the intake and exhaust along with installing a new compressor in the supercharger which gave optimum airflow to the engine in all driving conditions. These changes didn't hamper the fuel economy and it remained the same as a standard B6.

In order to improve airflow to the engine, Alpina installed a new hood made of composite materials which had openings in it to allow the air to pass to the engine. The interior options, tyres and wheels as well as the transmission remained the same as a standard B6.

Performance was slightly improved over the B6, with a 0–97 km/h (0–60 mph) acceleration time of 4.5 seconds and a top speed of 318 km/h (198 mph).

=== B6 GT3 ===
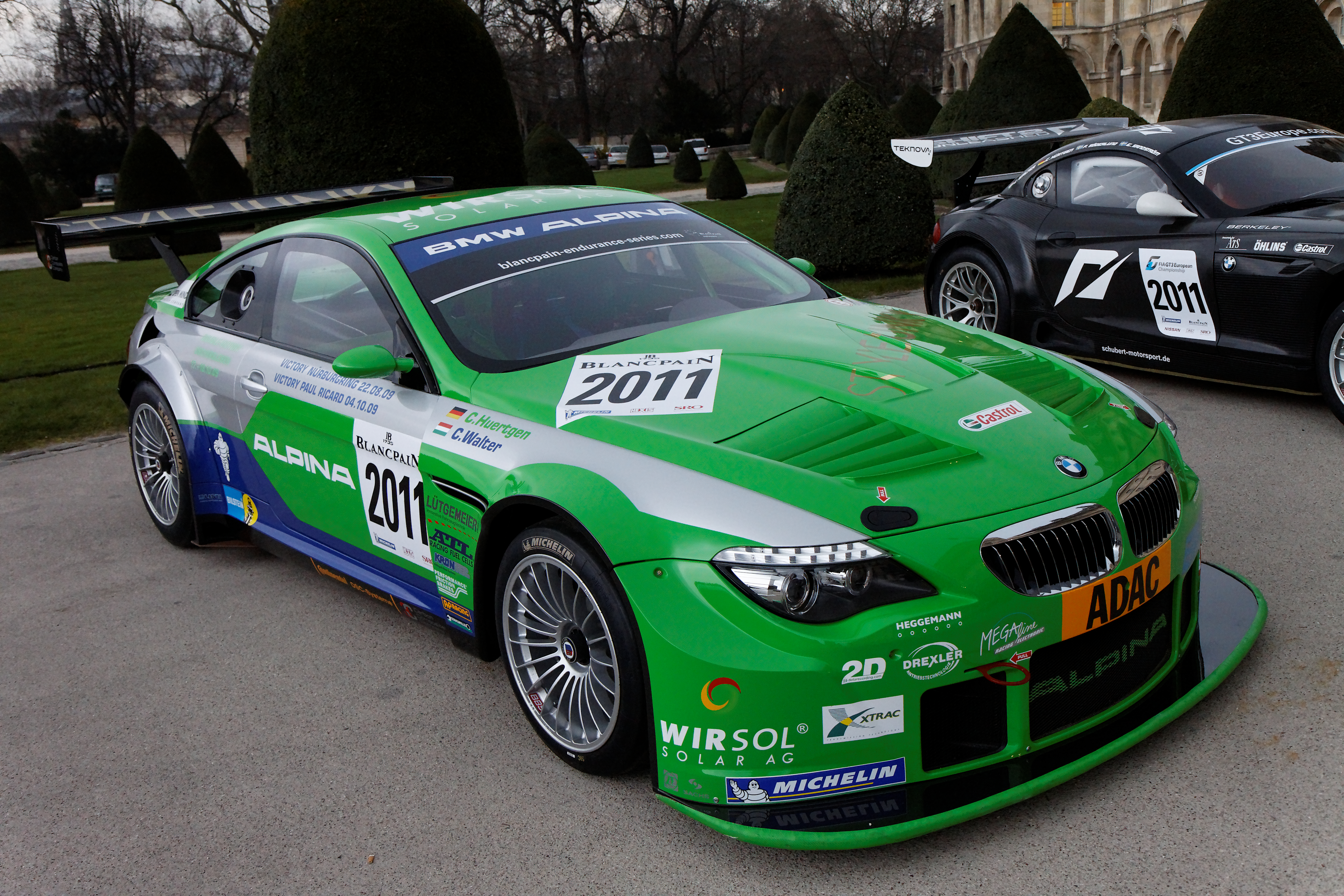
Alpina B6 GT3

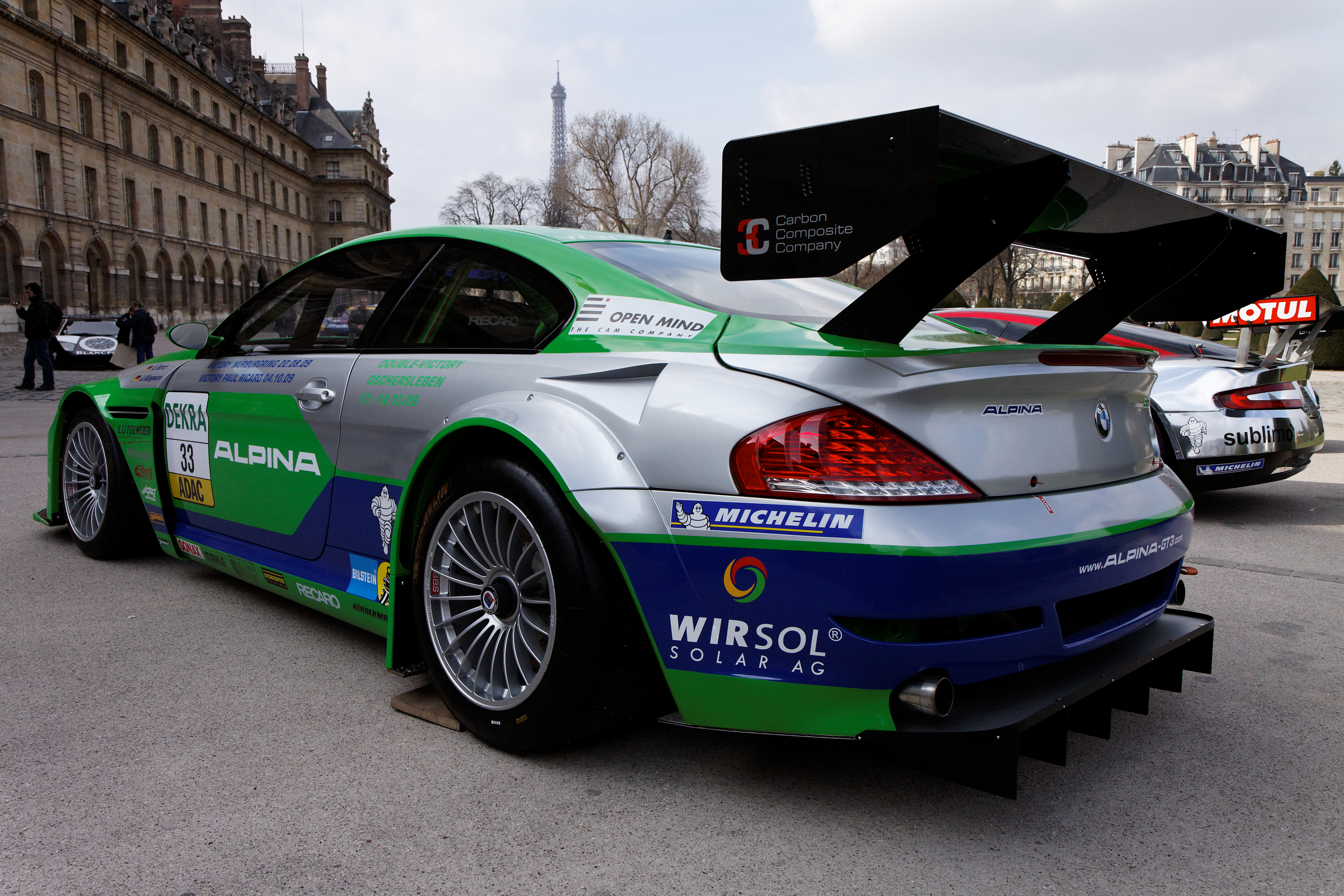
Rear view

Introduced in 2009, the B6 GT3 marked Alpina's return to motorsport after a hiatus of 20 years. Designed to compete in the FIA GT3 world championship, the GT3 comes with a modified version of the BMW S62 4.9-litre naturally aspirated, V8 engine found in the B6 generating 570 PS (419 kW; 562 hp) and 725 N⋅m (535 lb⋅ft) of torque. The engine is mated to an Xtrac 6-speed sequential manual transmission operated by shift paddles on the steering column. By using carbon-fibre body panels and stripping off the interior of its luxuries, the weight was brought down to 1,350 kg (2,976 lb) (dry).

Other changes include a wide body kit with a front splitter and tow hook, a new hood with cooling vents for improved engine cooling, 18-inch alloy wheels wrapped in Michelin racing slicks, a racing fuel cell, a roll cage, a big rear wing along with a diffuser, a race specific exhaust system and a Recaro racing bucket seat for the driver only.

Performance figures included a 0–97 km/h (0–60 mph) acceleration time of 3.9 seconds and a top speed of 285 km/h (177 mph). The top speed was reduced in comparison to the road going B6 due to added aerodynamic drag. The car was available for sale to privateer racing teams as well as collectors and Alpina clients.
