= Morgan Aero 8 =

English sports car model

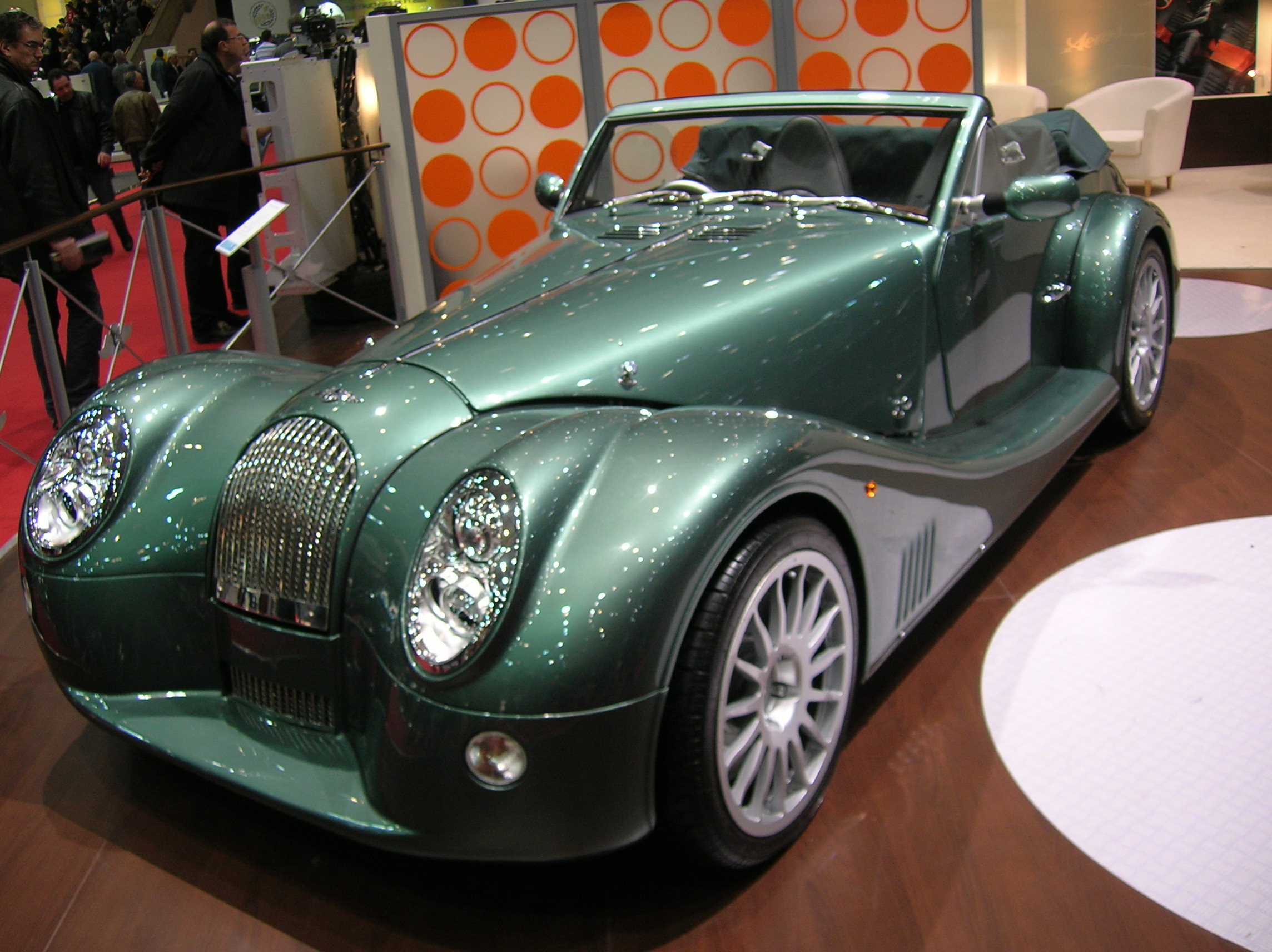
- Morgan Aero 8 (March 2006)

Overview
- Manufacturer: Morgan Motor Company
- Production: 2000–2018
- Assembly: United Kingdom: Malvern Link, England
- Designer: Aero 8: Chris Lawrence, Charles Morgan and Norman Kent; AeroMax, Aero Supersports and Aero Coupe: Matthew Humphries

Body and chassis
- Class: Sports car (S)
- Body style: 2-door coupé; 2-door convertible; 2-door targa top; 2-door speedster
- Layout: Front mid-engine, rear-wheel-drive

Powertrain
- Engine: 4.4 L BMW M62TUB44 V8; 4.4 L BMW N62B44 V8; 4.6 L BMW M62TUB46 V8; 4.8 L BMW N62B48 V8
- Transmission: 6 speed manual/automatic

Dimensions
- Wheelbase: 2.53 mt (100 in)
- Length: 4.12 mt (162 in)
- Width: 1.77 mt (69 in)
- Kerb weight: 1180 kg (2596 lb)

The Morgan Aero 8 is a sports car built by Morgan Motor Company at its factory in Malvern Link, England from 2000 until 2018.

The Aero 8 shape evolved in the traditional Morgan way of form following function and the main players were Chris Lawrence, Charles Morgan and other members of the Morgan Engineering Team, and Norman Kent of Survirn Engineering Ltd – especially for the tooling of the Aero wings.

The AeroMax, Aero Supersports and Aero Coupe were designed by the firm's designer Matthew Humphries. Humphries sent the basic design of it to Charles Morgan when he was at Coventry University and joined Morgan on a KTP programme.

Radshape were heavily involved in the chassis (Graham Chapman, the current MMC Development Director was working for them at that time) and Superform with much of the body panels, both companies eventually producing for MMC when the car was launched.

Announced in 2000, the Aero 8 is notable for several reasons, primarily because it was the first new Morgan design since 1964's +4+. It was touted as Morgan's first supercar and undertook a comprehensive development programme including endurance testing at BMW's huge proving grounds L'Autodrome de Miramas. It does not use anti-roll bars, an oddity in a modern sporting car. It is also the first Morgan vehicle with an aluminium chassis and frame as opposed to traditional Morgan vehicles ("trads") that have an aluminium skinned wooden body tub on a steel chassis.

The engine first powering the Aero 8 was a 4.4 L BMW M62 V8 mated to a 6-speed Getrag transmission. In 2007, the Series 4 Aero 8 was released which had an upgraded 4.8 L BMW N62 V8 with an optional ZF automatic transmission. All Aero 8s are assembled at Morgan's Malvern Link factory, where they are able to produce up to 14 cars a week (Aeros and trads).

It has been criticised for its "crosseyed" look which originally was justified by the manufacturers as conferring aerodynamic benefits. In response, Morgan changed the design from 2005 (Series 3 and all subsequent Aero iterations), using Mini rather than VW New Beetle headlights.

== Prototypes ==
Nine prototypes were produced.

== Aero 8 Series 1 (2000–2004) ==
Considered to be Morgan's first supercar, the first run of Aero models was unveiled at the Geneva Motor Show in 2000 by Charles Morgan, it was in his words "the result of the biggest development project ever undertaken by the Morgan Motor Company". The result of many years of hard work, a development programme that included racing in the FIA GT series and a partnership with BMW.

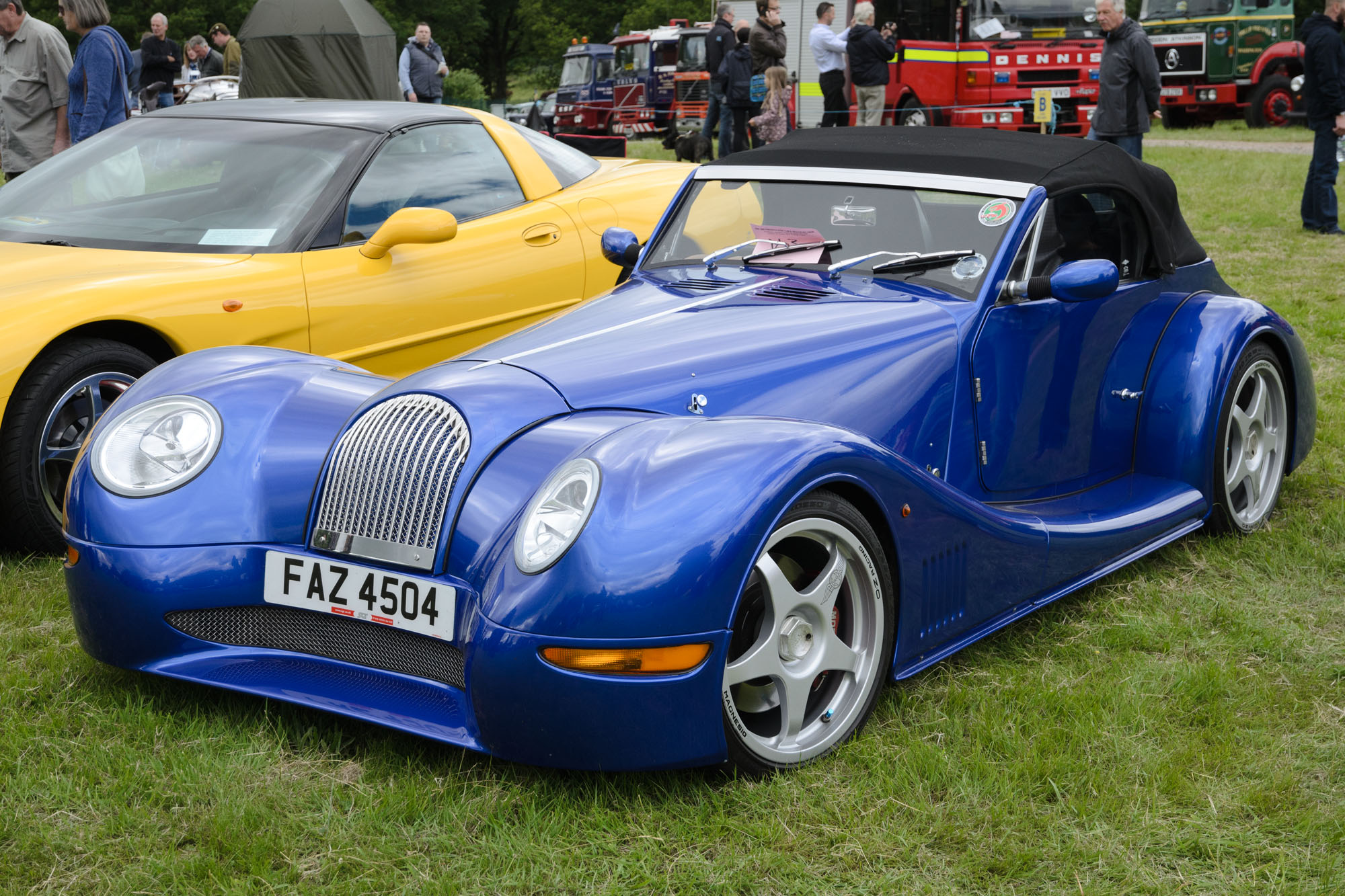
2002 Morgan Aero 8

Whilst the car structure comes as pre-formed bonded aluminium elements significant work goes into hand making the overall vehicle continuing the handmade history of the company. The method of building the car was ahead of most companies in the marketplace and represented a dramatic shift for the company.

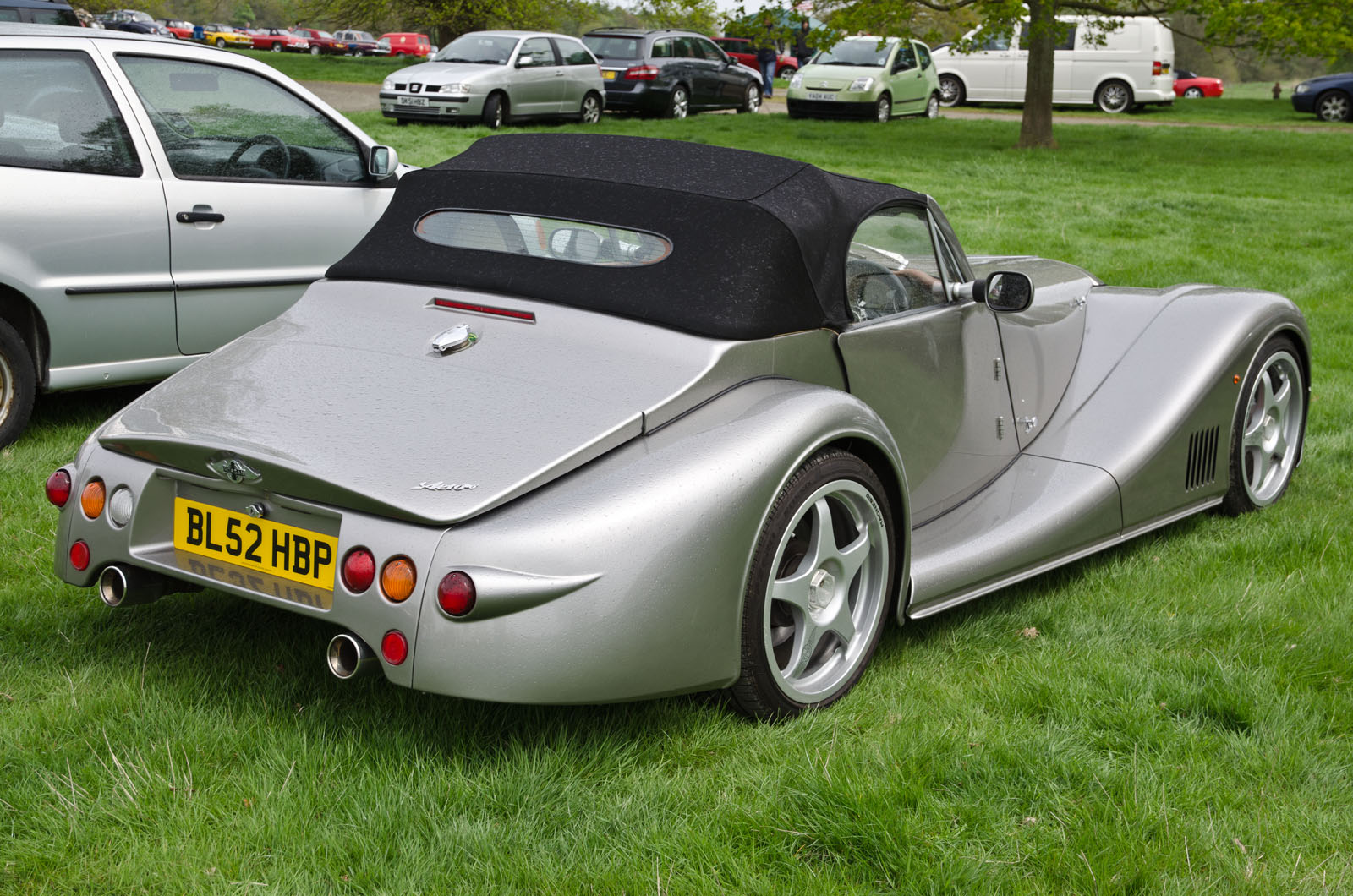
2002 Morgan Aero 8 rear

The bonded aluminium chassis has elements of an ash frame to provide a link to the more traditional cars. It was designed by Chris Lawrence who had a long-standing relationship with Morgan and included many features of racing cars of the time. Items such as in-board shock absorbers, double wishbones all round, a flat floor, centre lock magnesium wheels, rose-jointed suspension and other elements were included providing significant handling improvements over previous models.

Complete with a bespoke aluminium chassis, all independent suspension and powered by a 4.4 litre BMW V8 engine (M62TUB44) producing 282 hp (210 kW; 286 PS) at 5500 rpm and 322 lb⋅ft (437 N⋅m) at 3750 rpm this was a radical departure from the traditionally built Morgans. Performance was 0 to 62 mph in 4.8 seconds with a top speed of 160 mph (257 km/h).

The interior had a turned aluminium dashboard, unusual asymmetric design and a custom made Mulberry case for use as a removable glovebox, along with nods to modern services such as cruise control, air-conditioning and a heated windscreen.

With many elements from BMW including the engine, gearbox and axle to push 1100 kg the performance was on a par with Ferraris, Porsches, TVRs and other supercars of the day. Whilst the car did include a limited-slip differential the absence of other stability and traction aids mean the driver had total control over the car.

Famous for its cross-eyed squint courtesy of the reversed VW Beetle headlamps, this was a culmination of both aerodynamic requirements and availability of light units at the time. Initially Porsche lights had been trialled along with the yet to be released new Mini units, the Mini lights were a favourite but BMW didn't want the first model to launch their new headlights to be the Aero so these were not an option. Aerodynamically (extensive wind tunnel testing was carried out at MIRA – another Morgan first) Morgan needed a way to allow the leading edge of the front wings to be forward of the radiator, thus providing space to incorporate a front splitter. The VW Beetle headlamps were spotted by Chris Lawrence who envisaged reversing them to give the perfect angle to meet the aerodynamic requirements, and thus the cross-eyed look was born.

Around 210 Series 1 cars were made with many smaller changes being made to the car over this period internally and externally.

== Aero 8 GTN (2004) ==
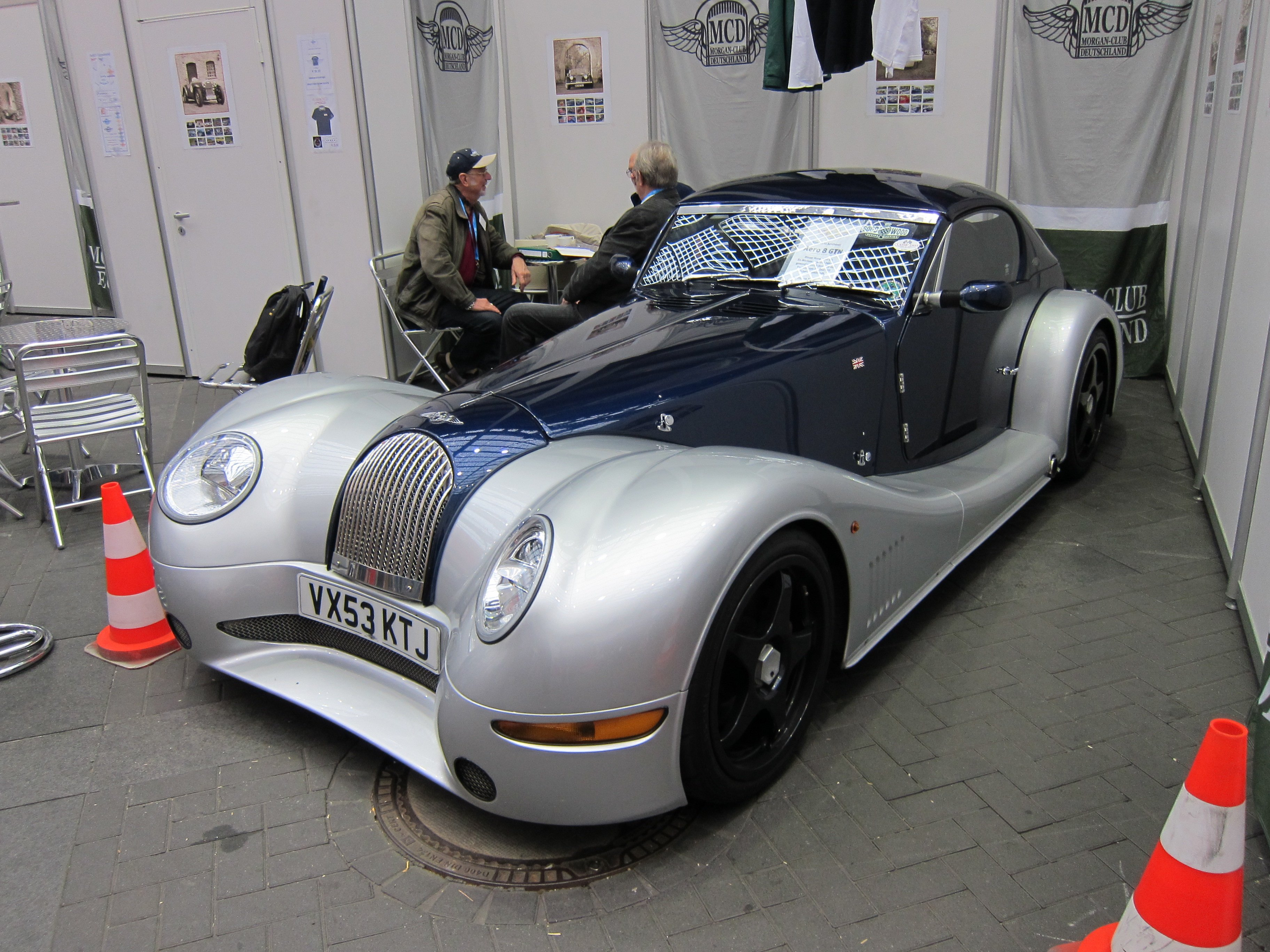
Morgan Aero 8 GTN

This limited edition run-out model of the Series 1 was a nod to the successful Aero GT/Le Mans racing cars and included the 4.6L Alpina BMW engine used on Alpina B10 and on BMW X5 4.6iS – 4619cc, 330 bhp (246 kW), with a 0-60 mph time of 4.3 seconds and a top speed of 175 mph (266 km/h). This version had slightly different and stiffened suspension plus semi-slick AO48's fitted as standard to black OZ centre lock magnesium wheels, a carbon fibre roof, carbon fibre interior and numerous other enhancements.

Just eleven were produced, all of them in a two-tone colour scheme of BMW blue/silver.

It was supplied with a carbon-fibre hardtop (the first Aero to get a hardtop) alongside an optional soft top roof, of which it is believed only a couple of GTN owners chose. Along with a carbon fibre dashboard, unique gloss black wooden trim, a custom Mota-Lita steering wheel, a special leather interior, and performance side exhausts the car had blistering performance as demonstrated on Top Gear by Richard Hammond (Season 5 Episode 5) who later went on to own several Morgans.

== Aero 8 Series 2 (2004–2005) ==
Series 2 of the Aero 8 was launched at the 2004 Los Angeles Motor Show. This was the first Aero that was made for sale in North America. It was called the Aero Series 2 or Aero America as a result.

The back of the car was changed in a number of ways. The petrol tank was repositioned to comply with US rear impact regulations. The boot lid was raised to improve aerodynamics and storage. The previous folding roof was changed for a pram style changing the shape from the previous low "gangster" style roof of the Series 1.

It now used the BMW N62B44 4.4L V8 engine using a DIVA inlet manifold (the world's first continuously variable length inlet manifold) and producing 333 bhp (248 kW) at 6,100 rpm and 331 lb-ft (450Nm) at 3,600 rpm. The factory offered single side exit exhausts as an option with the exit just in front of the rear wheels on each side. The new V8 provided a top speed of 160 mph (257 km/h) with 0 to 62 mph (100 km/h) acceleration in 4.8 seconds.

Further revisions included a conversion to standard 5 stud wheels, uprated gearbox, brakes and other elements of the running gear. The car retained the same overall dimensions but internal space was increased by moving the doors further out and making the wings/running boards narrower over the Series 1.

The unusual asymmetric dashboard of the Series 1 was replaced with a more conventionally styled dashboard, however, the fly-off handbrake was retained.

Somewhere in the region of 60 cars (both LHD and RHD) were produced.

== Aero 8 Series 3 (2005–2007) ==
2007 Morgan Aero 8

The third iteration of the Aero was largely around adding the new style Mini headlamps with changes to the wings and front panels resolving the famous squint of the earlier cars. It retained the interior and mechanical platform of the Series 2. This new front design went on to be used on the new AeroMax and subsequent Aero models.

Approximately 200 Series 3 models were produced.

== Aero GT3 (2009) ==
2009 was the centenary year of Morgan and the company took part in FIA GT3 using the Aero Supersports which was claimed to be more aerodynamic. The Aero Supersports had been released at the prestigious 2009 Villa d’Este event.

The AutoGT team sponsored by Banque Baring Sturdza with former Renault F1 drivers Jean Pierre Jabouille and Jacques Laffite made a great impression at the start of the year. At the Silverstone, No. 100 got pole and won the first race then No. 101 secured pole and won the second race.

With a custom gearbox and slight enlargement of the engine the car was instantly competitive. The lower revving V8 and side exhaust layout resulted in a very distinctive NASCAR style off-beat sound which was deep and very loud. After one year of racing the rules were amended making it difficult for the car to run in 2010.

One of the cars in racing colours remains with the factory and can be seen on the factory tour.

== Aero 8 Series 4 (2007–2010) ==
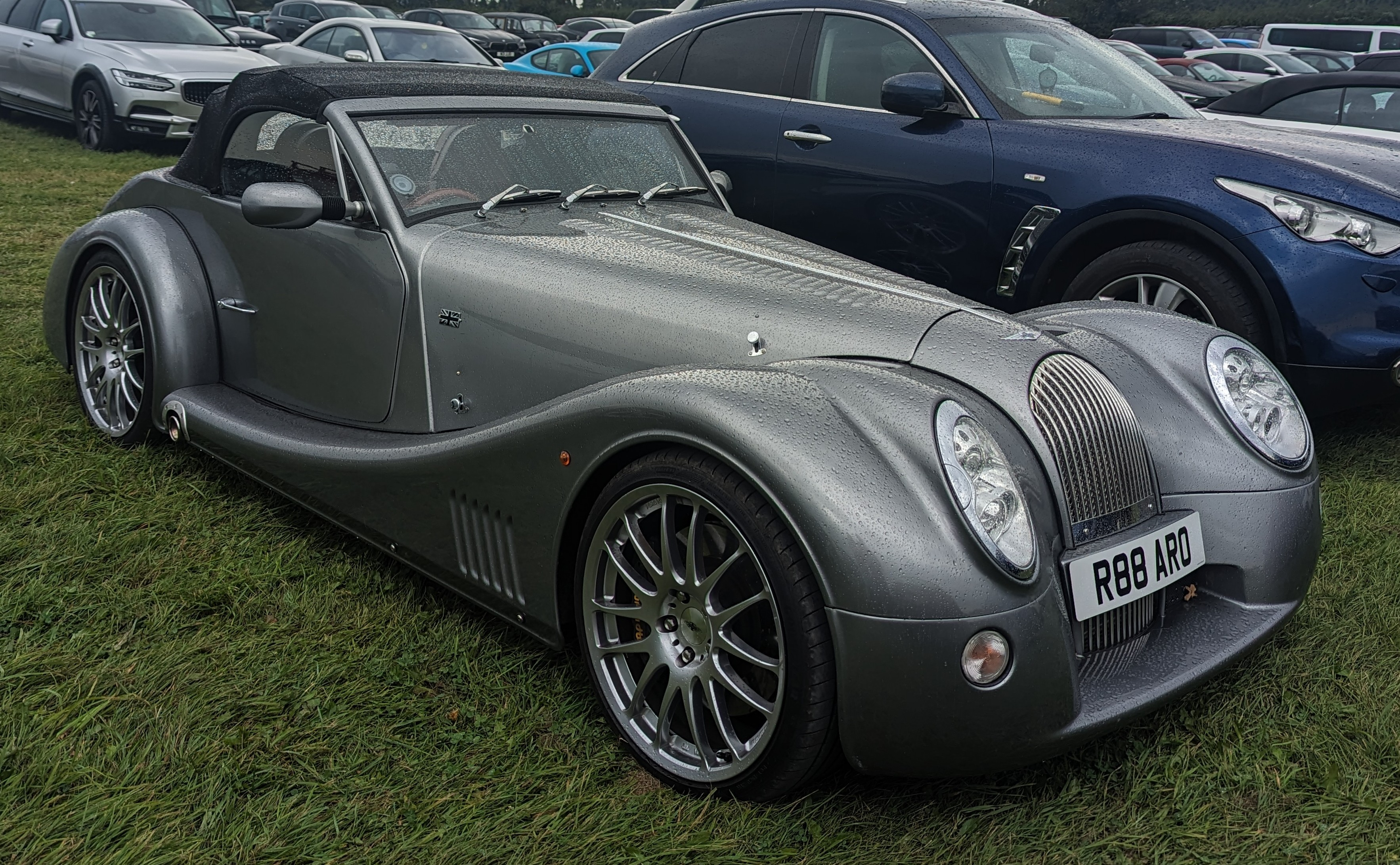
2009 Morgan Aero 8

Version 4 of the Morgan Aero 8 has seen the 3rd new engine in the life of the vehicle; the BMW 4.4 V8 has been replaced with the BMW 4.8 V8 (N62B48) with 362 bhp (270 kW) and 370 lb⋅ft (502 N⋅m) of torque. This 13% power increase over the previous Aero gives the new Series 4 Aero 8 a power to weight ratio of 315 bhp per tonne. While heavier BMW saloons were unable to meet emissions regulations with the 4.8l V8 the lighter Aero did meet the Euro 6 emissions standard. BMW produced a short run of engines on a prototype line for Morgan.

A first for the Aero 8 also comes in the form of an optional automatic transmission; Morgan state: – ZFs 6 HP26 six speed gives even better performance than a manual gearbox due to its special lock up clutch, low power loss design and instant change characteristic. The automatic is usable either as a full automatic for more relaxed driving or in sport manual mode when the bespoke gear lever will hold the engine revs up to the maximum in each gear, increase change speed and blip the throttle to smooth down changes.

In addition to these technical changes, a repositioned fuel tank (to improve the weight distribution), revised instrumentation (from cream dials with blue numerals to black with white), an increase in luggage space, revised air vents, a move to a conventional handbrake lever and air intakes and exits on the front wings distinguish the Series 4 Aero 8 from previous models.

== AeroMax (2005, 2008–2009) ==
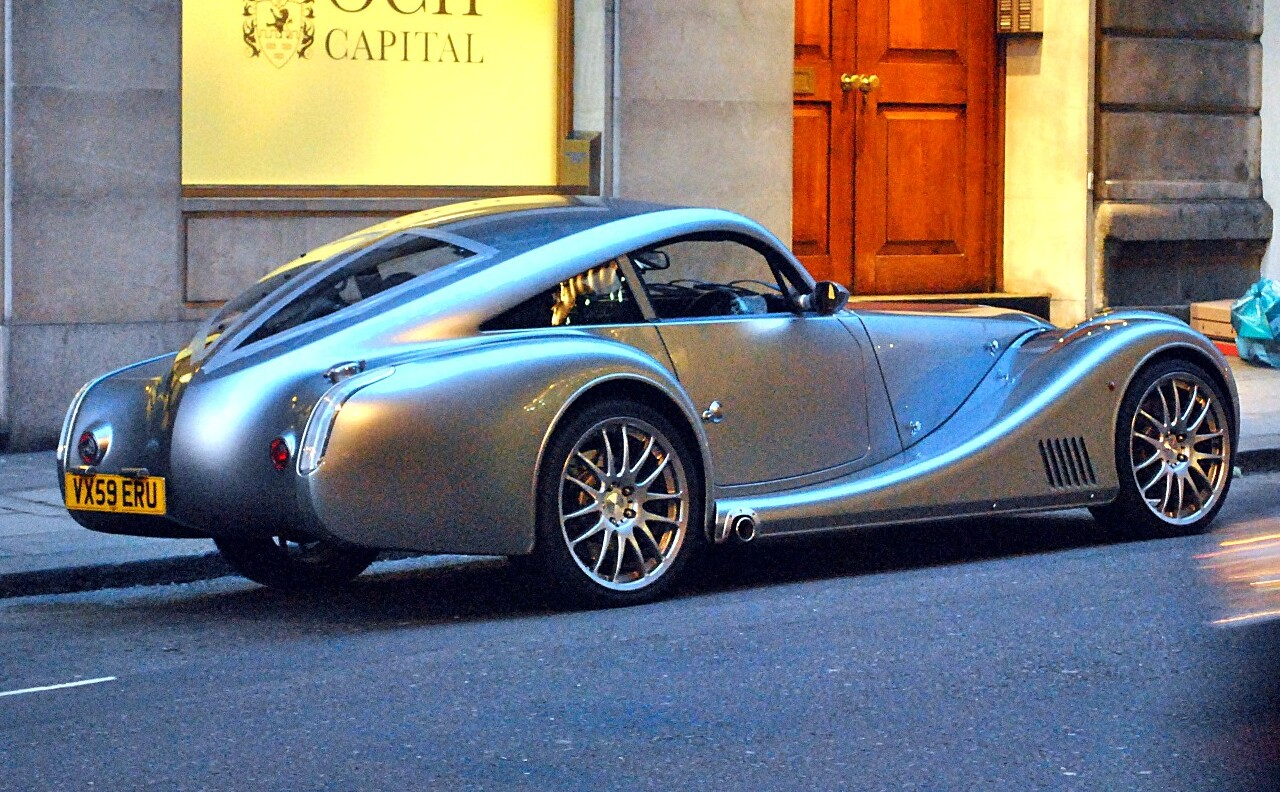
Morgan AeroMax, pictured in London, showing the distinctive 'boat tail' rear

Initially presented at the 2005 Geneva Motor Show as a bespoke car built for well respected Morgan customer Prince Eric Sturdza of Banque Baring Sturdza in Geneva, the AeroMax was the next development of the Aero chassis. The car is named after Charles Morgan's son Max.

Due to the level of interest at the show, and with the agreement of Prince Sturdza, a limited production run of 100 in celebration of Morgan's centenary was agreed, with final numbers ending slightly over this due to replacement of crashed cars. Production was initiated in 2008 and completed in 2009.

The design was created by Matt Humphries, a 21 year old Coventry University Graduate working at the factory. The Empire Line or Art Deco influenced styling has often been compared to cars such as classic Bugattis, whilst retaining a clear family relationship with Morgan's other cars.

Many changes were made to the overall shape, including the use of the rear lights from the Lancia Thesis, which were used on the AeroMax, Aero Supersports, Aero Coupe and Aero 8 Series 5, as well as the flush fit of the doors and changes to the interior finish. The Rays alloy wheels introduced on this model became popular on other models following the AeroMax.

It was the first Morgan to have a retail price above £100,000, at £110,000, but sold out within a few months.

== Aero Supersports (2009–2016) ==
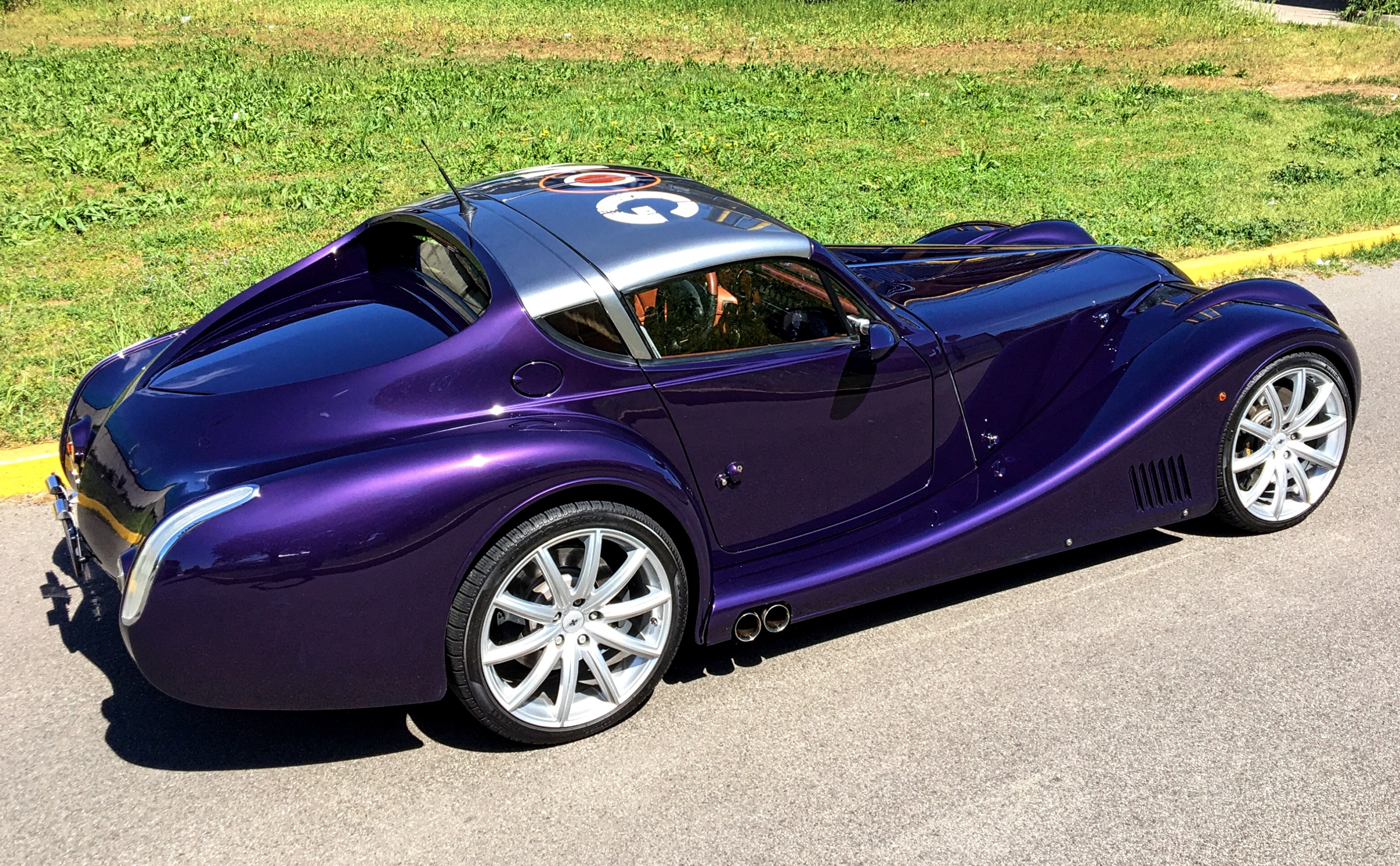
2010 Morgan Aero Supersports rear

The Morgan Aero SuperSports is a targa-roofed development of the AeroMax platform.

Presented in 2009 at the Concorso d'Eleganza Villa d'Este to celebrate the 100 year anniversary of Morgan, the Supersports shares its chassis, engine and transmission with the Aero 8 Series 4. The Aero Supersports presented at Villa d'Este was based on the AeroMax. The main differences with the production model are: different position of the fuel tank, the refill fuel cap on the rear wheel arch, smaller boot (targa roof panels could not fit into the boot) and two champagne bottle and glass holders behind the seats. The rear of the car retained the Lancia Thesis rear lights and wing shape, but had a boat tail style with a comparatively large practical boot.

Charles Morgan visited Jay Leno's Garage in a Supersports.

== Aero Coupe (2012–2016) ==
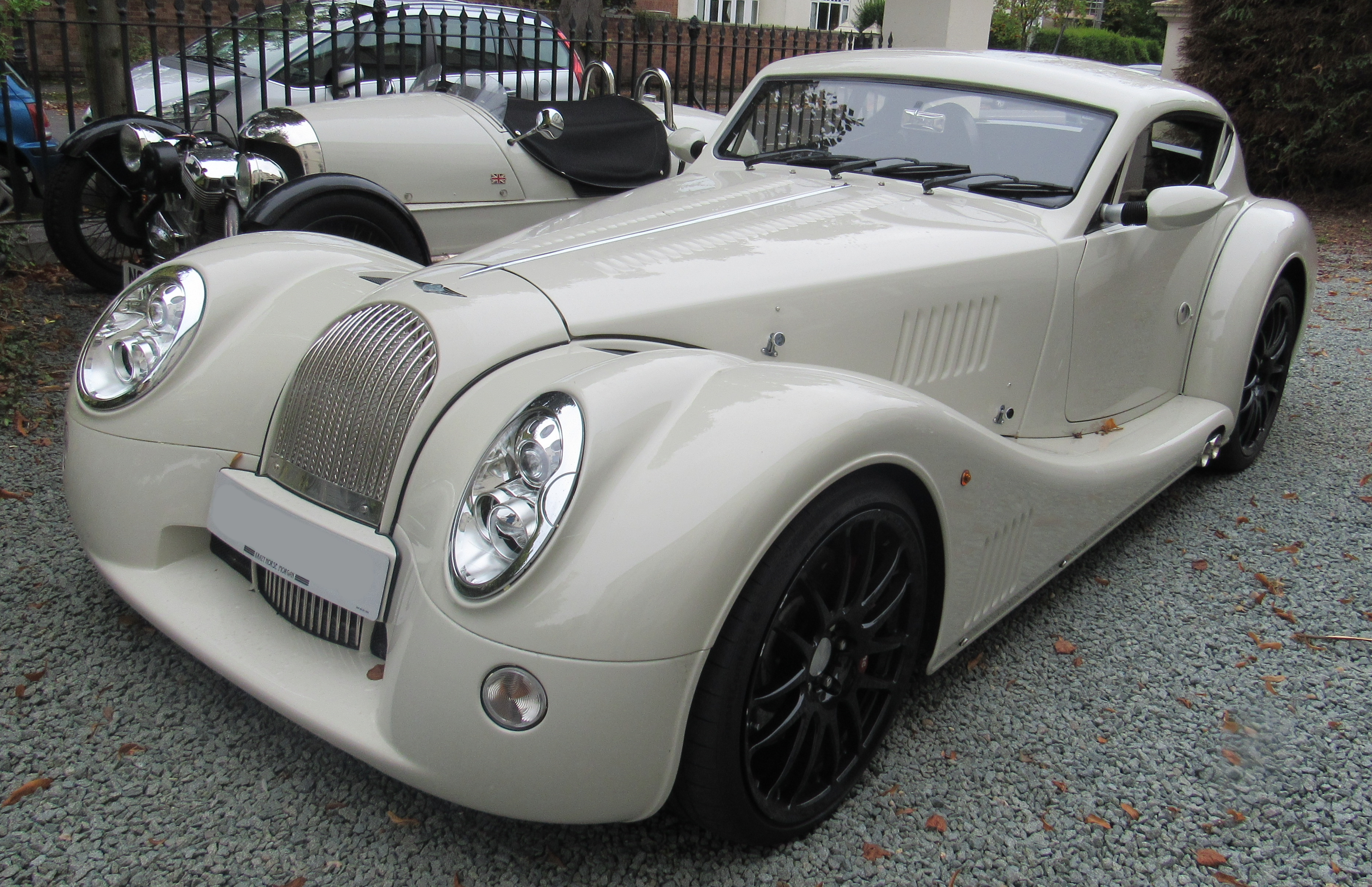
Morgan Aero Coupe

The Coupe was introduced a short time after the Supersports and remained in production alongside it. The cars are largely identical with the Coupe having a fixed roof in the same design as the targa panels on the Supersports.

== Plus 8 (2012–2019) ==
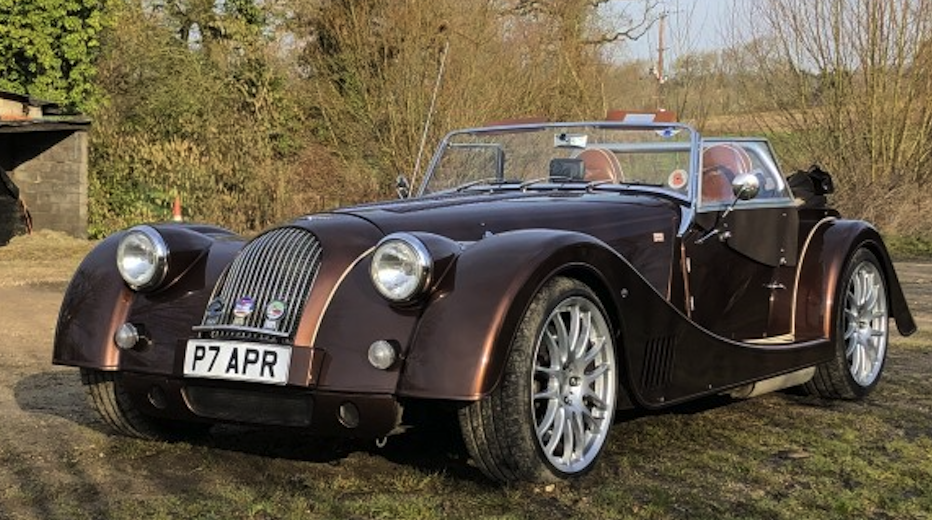
Morgan Aero Plus 8

The new Plus8 was introduced in 2012 using the Aero 8 platform, 4.8L engine and a manual or automatic gearbox. The body is intended to match the style of the traditional model with the same shape wings and rear panels. It also has an interior more like the traditional model with central dials, removable side-screens and a traditional soft-top. Where the Aero cars have a boot, the Plus 8 has a rear shelf behind the seats but no boot. In most cases, the owners mount a luggage rack.

When the Aero 8 Series 5 was launched Morgan updated the rear suspension design of the Plus 8 to match that of the Aero, generally cars built in 2015 have Aero 8 Series 4 rear suspension, and cars build from 2016 have the Series 5 suspension.

The Plus8 is the lightest V8 passenger car in the world approved to European safety standards.

As the limited supply of BMW 4.8L V8 engines ran out Morgan produced a final batch of 50 Plus 8 models labeled Plus 8 50th Anniversary to celebrate the models 50 years of production through the Rover-based Traditional model onto the Aero platform.

== Plus 8 Speedster (2014) ==
Morgan Plus 8 Speedster

This special edition of the Plus 8 is intended to look like a traditional cafe racer. The changes were simple bodywork and paint options. It features minimal aero screens, similar to those found on Caterhams. In addition, a new alloy wheel was added, was made to look like a traditional plain steel wheel. Other options offered were bonnet straps and bright contrasting external trim colours.

It was possible to spec a Speedster with the normal Plus 8 windscreen, and a few were converted, however, the small reduction in usability that the Speedster had over a Plus 8 were always going to be celebrated by the eccentric Morgan community and the car gained very positive reviews.

== Aero 8 Series 5 (2016–2018) ==
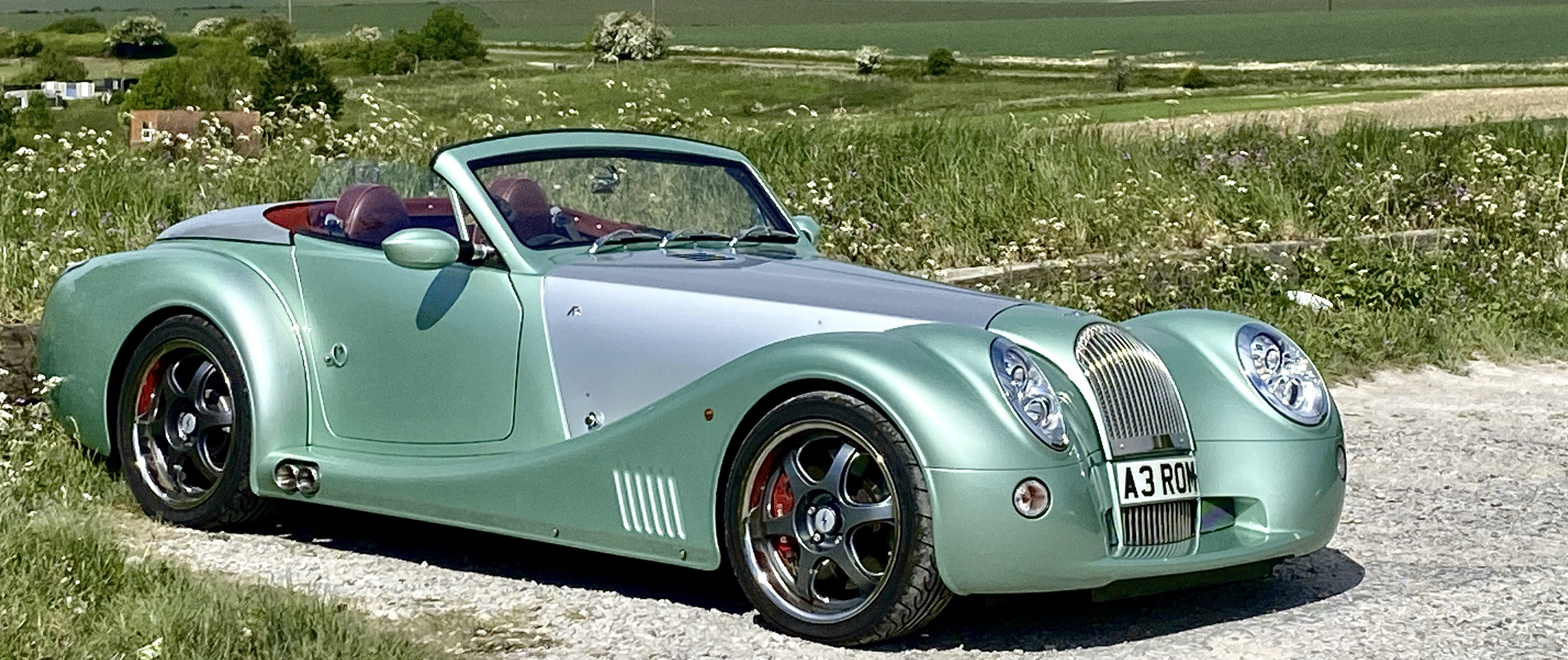
Morgan Aero 8 Series 5

At the Geneva Motor Show in March 2015, Morgan announced that the Morgan Aero 8 would be revived with a Series 5 model.

The Series 5 reintroduced a soft top to the Aero range but still using the same BMW 4.8L V8 engine and manual or automatic gearbox (with a paddle option for the auto). This was completed by the new design lead Jonathan Wells with the intention of bringing a fresh theme to the model with more modern materials. New interior finishes with a change to the dashboard and infotainment continue to update the experience.

The car retained the front design of the Aero models however the rear design was more akin to the boat tail of the Supersports with the Lancia Thesis lights and curves. The revised rear design permitted it to have a fabric roof that can be stored in the rear parcel slot, giving the car a flat rear deck profile. Morgan offered an optional, removable, carbon-fibre hard top.

The Series 5 also has a completely new front and rear suspension, with anti roll bars and outboard conventional wishbones and coil over units. Additional structural elements replacing the inboard suspension units gave added chassis stiffness.

As the supply of BMW V8 engines came to an end a final run of 8 Aero GTs was released with a number of design changes including vents in the front wings, canards at the leading edges and an enhanced rear venturi. The standard carbon fibre hard top added a ventilation bulge at its rear. The GT has adjustable suspension, and is otherwise mechanically identical to the Series 5. At launch the GTs were said to be manual gearbox-only, but at least one of the eight has been seen with an autobox. This run out model sold out quickly despite having a quite substantial list price increase over the normal Series 5 at £145,000. Morgan MD Steve Morris was regularly seen in a metallic orange GT, which was a rebodied Series 5.

With the close of production of the Aero GT and Plus 8 50th Anniversary model the Aero chassis was retired to be replaced with the new CX aluminium platform. The CX name meaning 110 in roman numerals as it was introduced in the 110th year of Morgan's business.

The CX model represented another big step forward for the company as it introduced a new range of power trains again from BMW. Shortly after the development and release of the CX based PlusSix, Morgan gained external investment from InvestIndustrial, an Italian venture capital company, which took a majority share in the business.

== Bristol Bullet variant ==
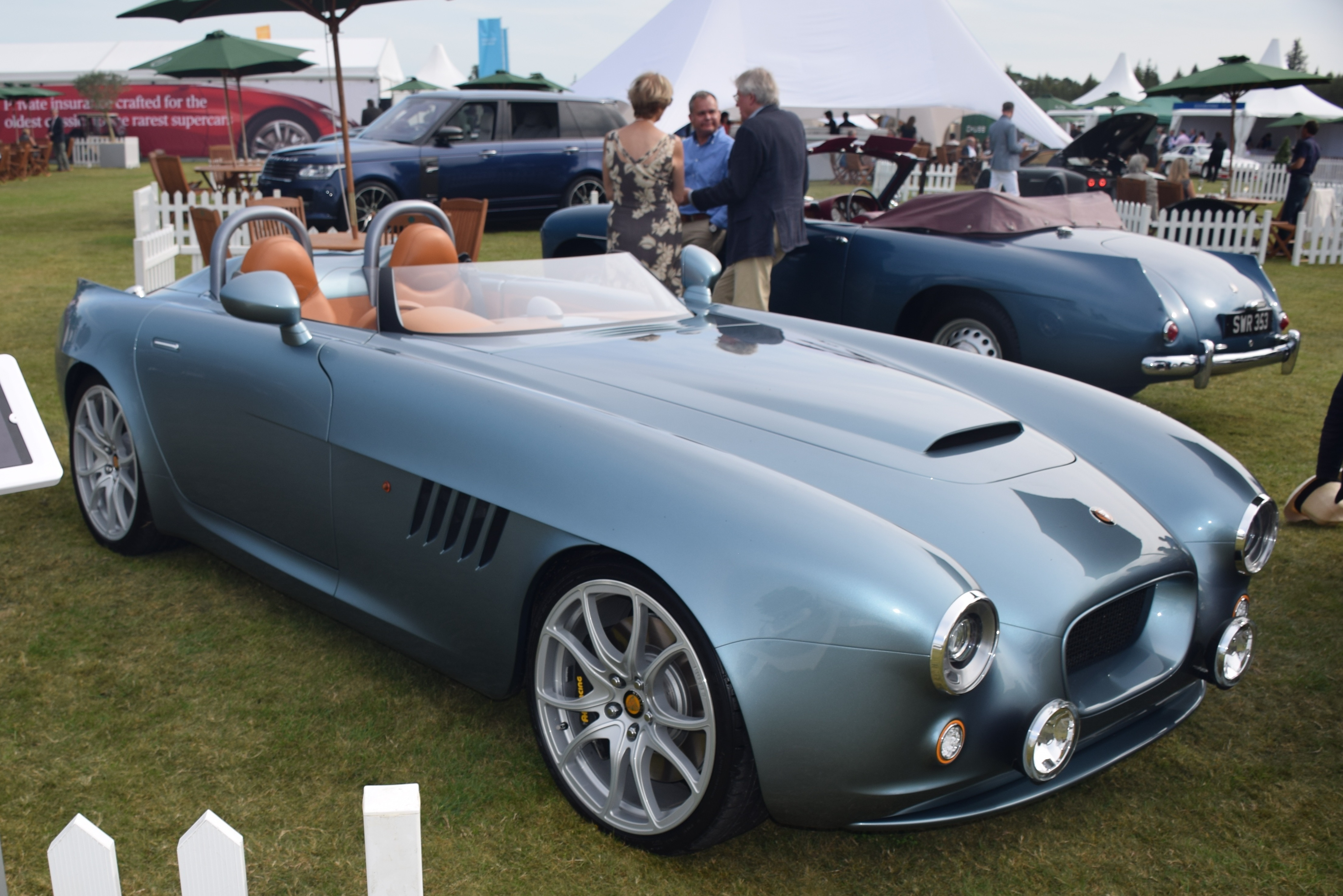
Bristol Bullet

In 2016, Bristol Cars announced their new Bullet model, using the Series 5 Aero/Aero Plus 8 platform and running gear. This was a very basic Speedster style body, itself modelled on the 1950s styling of Bristol's 404 & 405.

Only one prototype/demonstrator is known to have been fully built.

Morgan bought back the rolling chassis from Bristol's administrator before the liquidation auction, and announced the Plus 8 GTR – inspired by the Plus 8 that raced in the 1990s & which was known as Big Blue.

== Plus 8 GTR (2021) ==
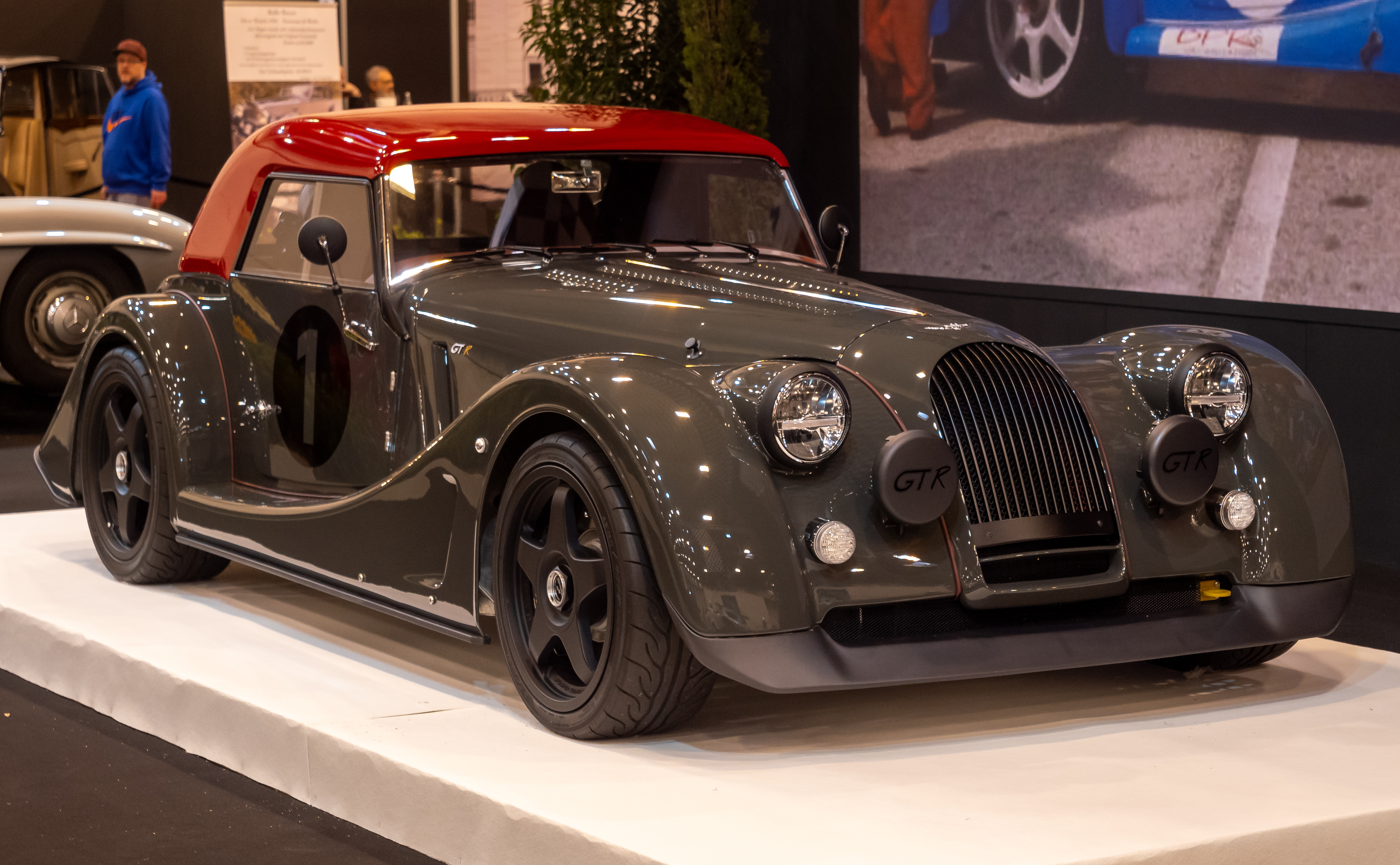
Morgan Plus 8 GTR

The Plus 8 GTR is a special project for the 2021 year using nine chassis sourced from the sale of Bristol's assets in 2020.

"Just nine Morgan Plus 8 GTRs will be built, with production beginning in summer 2021. The transformed special project will be available in certain worldwide markets, subject to local rules on the importation of European vehicles. As part of the special projects programme, customers will be invited to commission their bespoke Plus 8 GTR alongside Morgan’s design team."

Each of the nine Plus 8 GTR chassis and BMW 4.8L V8 engines were reworked and recommissioned, tuned to 375 bhp. Customers were given the limited availability options of 6-speed manual or automatic transmission. A removable hardtop is included in this setup.

== Specifications ==
=== Powertrain ===
The Aero 8's engine are all from BMW. Different engines have been used.

BMW 4.4L V8 – M62TUB44 – 210 kW (286 PS; 282 bhp) – Used on: Aero 8 Series 1

BMW 4.6L V8 – M62TUB46 – 246 kW (334 PS; 330 bhp) – Used on: Aero 8 GTN

BMW 4.4L V8 – N62B44 – 248 kW (338 PS; 333 bhp) – Used on: Aero 8 Series 2, Series 3 and AeroMax

BMW 4.8L V8 – N62B48 – 270 kW (367 PS; 362 hp) – Used on: Aero 8 Series 4, Series 5, Aero Supersports, Aero Coupe, Plus 8, Plus 8 speedster, Plus 8 GTR

The engine is paired with either a Getrag 6-speed manual or ZF 6HP 6-speed automatic transmission.

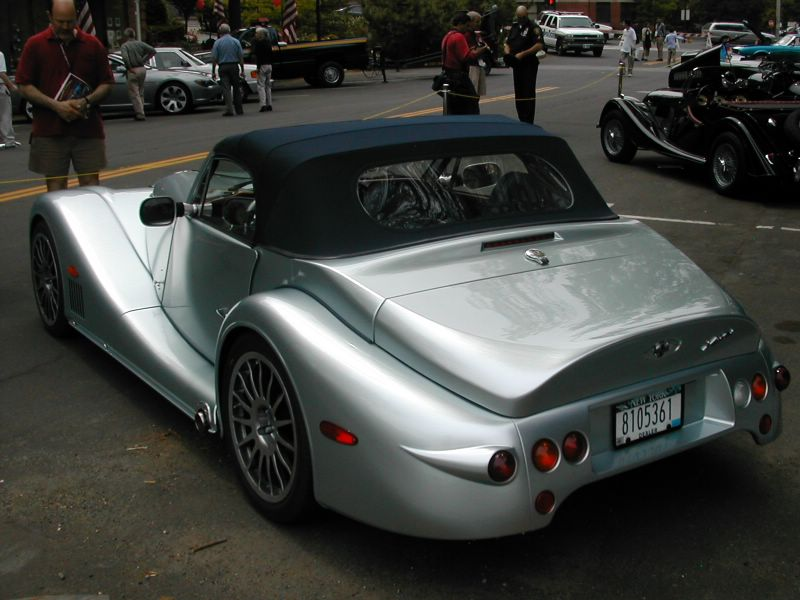
Morgan Aero 8 Series 2 rear

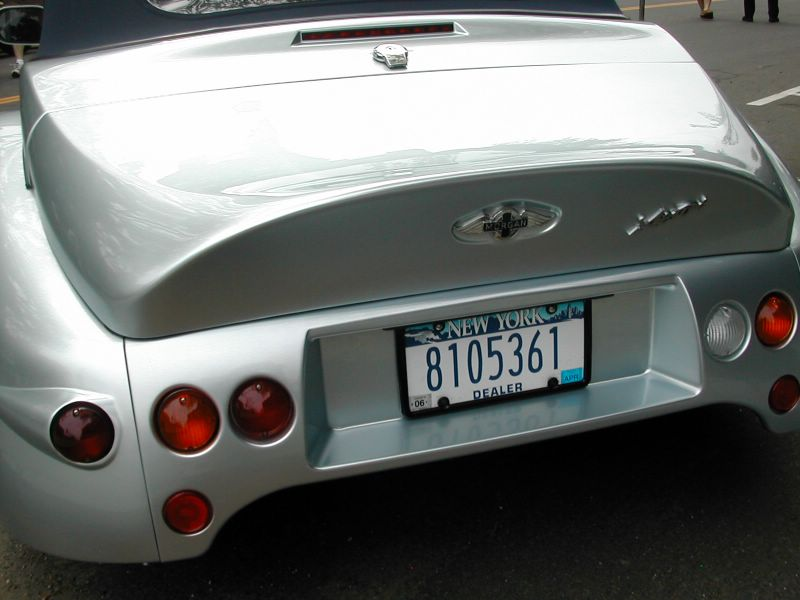
Morgan Aero 8 Series 2 boot and badge

=== Chassis ===
The chassis is an ultra-stiff aluminium alloy. Suspension is fully Independent, with double wishbones, Eibach coil springs, fully floating in the rear, over Koni shock absorbers. Brakes are cast iron discs, with AP Racing 6-pot calipers at the front and 2-pot calipers at the rear.

=== Performance ===
Morgan Aero Supersports at Goodwood Festival of Speed 2010

For Version IV of the car, top speed is an estimated 170 mph (270 km/h) and 0 to 100 km/h (62 mph) is done in 4.3 seconds for the manual transmission and 4.1 seconds for the automatic.

=== Wheels and tyres ===
Common

- PCD 114.3 mm
- Holes 5
- HUB 68mm
- ET: 30

Front

- 8.5J x 18 (225/40R18)
- 8.5J x 19 (225/35R19)

Rear

- 8.5J x 18 (245/40R18)
- 8.5J x 19 (245/35R19)

== Motorsport ==
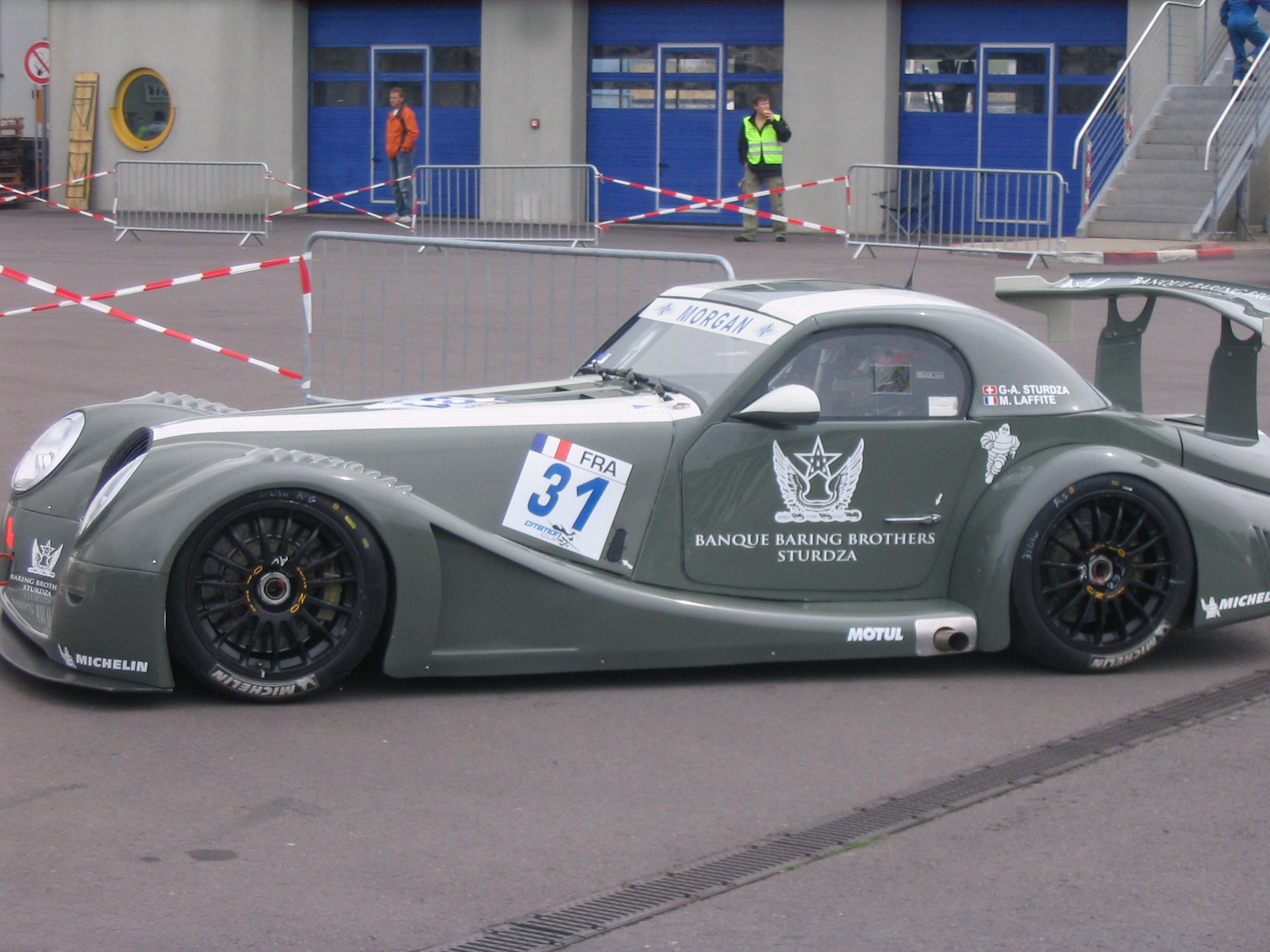
Morgan Aero 8 GT3 at Motopark Oschersleben

The Aero 8 has competed at the 24 Hours of Le Mans twice, in 2002 and 2004. There have also been several entries in the FIA GT series from both works cars and privateers. It is also used in the British GT Series. It is currently racing in the FIA GT3 European championship and has proven competitive. The Aero 8 GT3 car is built by AUTO GT. The Aero 8 was also used in the 2003 Bathurst 24 Hour scoring a DNF with a rare BMW engine failure and the 2004 12 Hours of Sebring finishing 20th outright and 10th in the GT class.
