= Alpina B7 (E65) =

German automobile

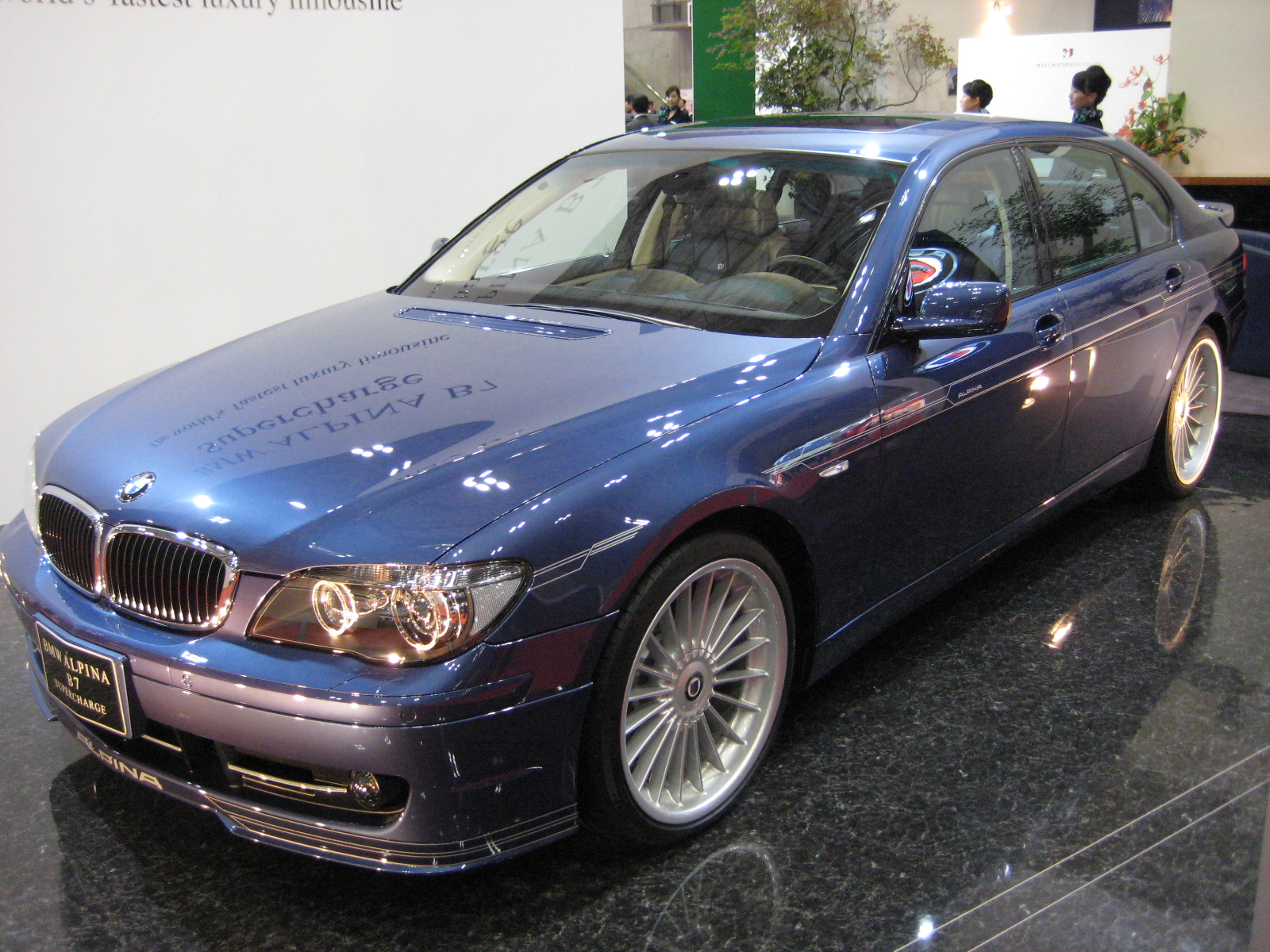
- Alpina B7 (E66) (post-facelift)

Overview
- Manufacturer: Alpina Burkard Bovensiepen GmbH & Co. KG
- Production: 2004–2008
- Assembly: Germany: Buchloe

Body and chassis
- Class: Full-size luxury car (F)
- Body style: 4-door saloon (E65); 4-door long wheelbase saloon (E66)
- Layout: Front-engine, rear-wheel-drive
- Related: BMW 7 Series (E65); Alpina B6 (E63); Alpina B5 (E60)

Powertrain
- Engine: 4.4 L H1 supercharged V8
- Transmission: 6-speed ZF 6HP automatic

Dimensions
- Wheelbase: 2,990 mm (117.7 in) (E65); 3,130 mm (123.2 in) (E66)
- Length: 5,029 mm (198.0 in) (E65); 5,169 mm (203.5 in) (E66)
- Width: 1,902 mm (74.9 in)
- Height: 1,484–1,492 mm (58.4–58.7 in)
- Kerb weight: 1,960 kg (4,321 lb) (minimum dry weight); 2,108 kg (4,648 lb) (with fluids)

Chronology
- Predecessor: Alpina B12 6.0 (E38)
- Successor: Alpina B7 (F01)

The Alpina B7 (E65) is the third generation of the Alpina B7, a high-performance executive car manufactured by Alpina from 2004 to 2008. Based on the BMW 7 Series (E65), the B7 was officially introduced to the public at the 2003 Frankfurt Motor Show. The B7 was the first Alpina to use a supercharged engine and was available in normal and long-wheelbase versions.

== Development and introduction ==
Development of the B7 began 3 years prior to its official debut, first at the 2003 Geneva Motor Show for the prototype and then the 2003 Frankfurt Motor Show for the production version. Production began in 2004. The B7 is based on the 745i while the long wheelbase B7 is based on the 745Li. The B7 uses a modified version of the 4.4-litre N62 V8 engine, designated the H1 by Alpina. Changes to the engine include an Alpina specific block, a forged crankshaft and lower compression high strength Mahle pistons. The engine uses a centrifugal type supercharger, the first to be used on an Alpina automobile. The engine also has an Alpina specific modified ECU and retains BMW's Valvetronic Variable Valve Timing. The engine generated a maximum power output of 500 PS (368 kW; 493 hp) between 5,250 and 6,000 rpm and 515 lb⋅ft (698 N⋅m) of torque available between 4,250 and 5,250 rpm. The application of a V8 engine instead of a V12 engine allows the car to be 150 kg (331 lb) lighter than its BMW counterpart, the 760i, while giving the car a better weight distribution and better fuel economy figures.

The B7 has a bespoke Akrapovic exhaust system that uses an EMITEC metallic catalytic converter instead of the standard ceramic unit and has dual exhaust tips.

The heat generated by the 0.8 bar of boost pressure from the supercharger is managed by a high-transfer rate air-to-air intercooler. The B7 uses the rear axle from a 745d in order to handle the high torque generated by the engine. The compressor is driven by a dedicated poly V-belt which is separate from the other serpentine belts on the engine. At low rpm, the clutch de-couples the compressor from its drive belt, resulting in high torque at the low rpm range. The air from the supercharger was guided to the engine by an air-to-air intercooler. The turbine of the supercharger rotates at speeds of up to 100,000 rpm due to a planetary gear set, an adjustable second throttle plate allows the turbine to keep rotating at low rpm range.

The engine is mated to a 6-speed ZF automatic transmission called Switch Tronic which has a manual shifting mode allowing the driver to change gears via buttons located on the back of the steering wheel. The transmission was used across Alpina's range of models until its replacement by the 8-speed automatic transmission.

The B7 was mostly assembled at the BMW plant in Dingolfing alongside the 7 Series. The engine was initially manufactured at the BMW Steyr plant and was then sent to Alpina at their Buchloe factory for final assembly. The engine was sent to the BMW factory to be installed in the car where the car was assembled and painted in Alpina specific exterior colours. The completed cars were sent back to the Alpina factory for final inspection and finishing touches.

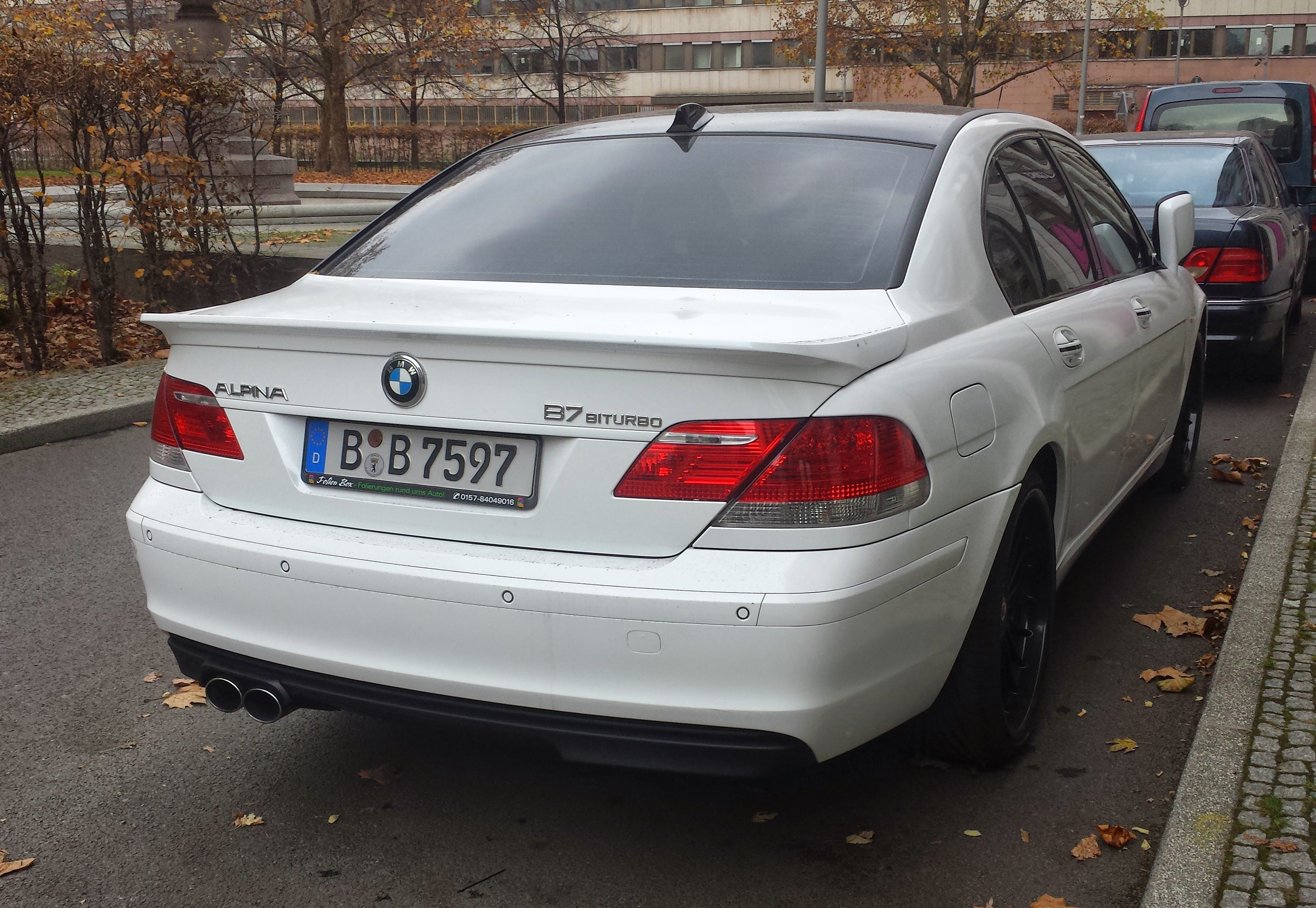
Alpina B7 (E65) (post facelift)

The interior of the car has Lavalina leather upholstery and curled maple wood trim. The changes include Alpina gauges, Alpina logos and badges and a three-spoke sports steering wheel. The BMW iDrive system was also included as standard.

The exterior changes include Alpina pinstripes on the paintwork, a rear lip spoiler, 21-inch Alpina classic multi-spoke alloy wheels wrapped in Michelin Pilot Sport 2 tyres (measuring 245/35 ZR21 at the front and 285/30 ZR21 at the rear), a front valence and a chin spoiler. The B7 achieved a drag coefficient of Cd=0.31 when tested in the BMW windtunnel.

The B7 uses the braking system developed by BMW for the 760Li which has bigger discs than a 745i (measuring 14.72 in (373.9 mm) at the front and 14.57 in (370.1 mm) at the rear) and floating calipers. The suspension system uses Sachs shock absorbers and Eibach springs.

From 2005 to the end of its production run, the B7 was based on the face-lift 745i and the 750Li. The updated B7 was unveiled at the 2005 Tokyo Motor Show. However, there was no change in power or performance figures. Peak torque was increased to 565 lb⋅ft (766 N⋅m). In 2007, the B7 became available in the United States.

== Performance ==
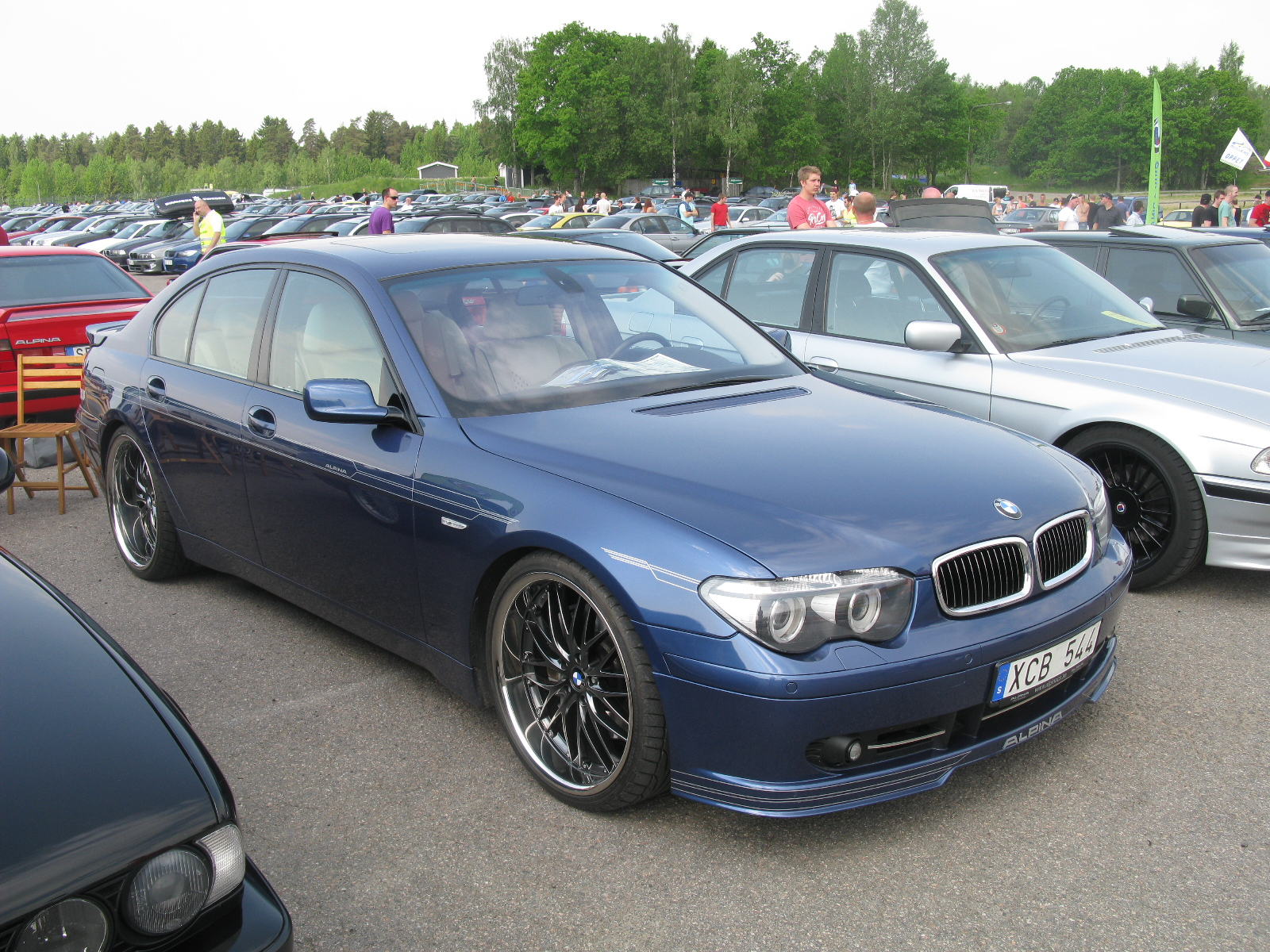
Alpina B7 (E65) (pre-facelift with aftermarket wheels)

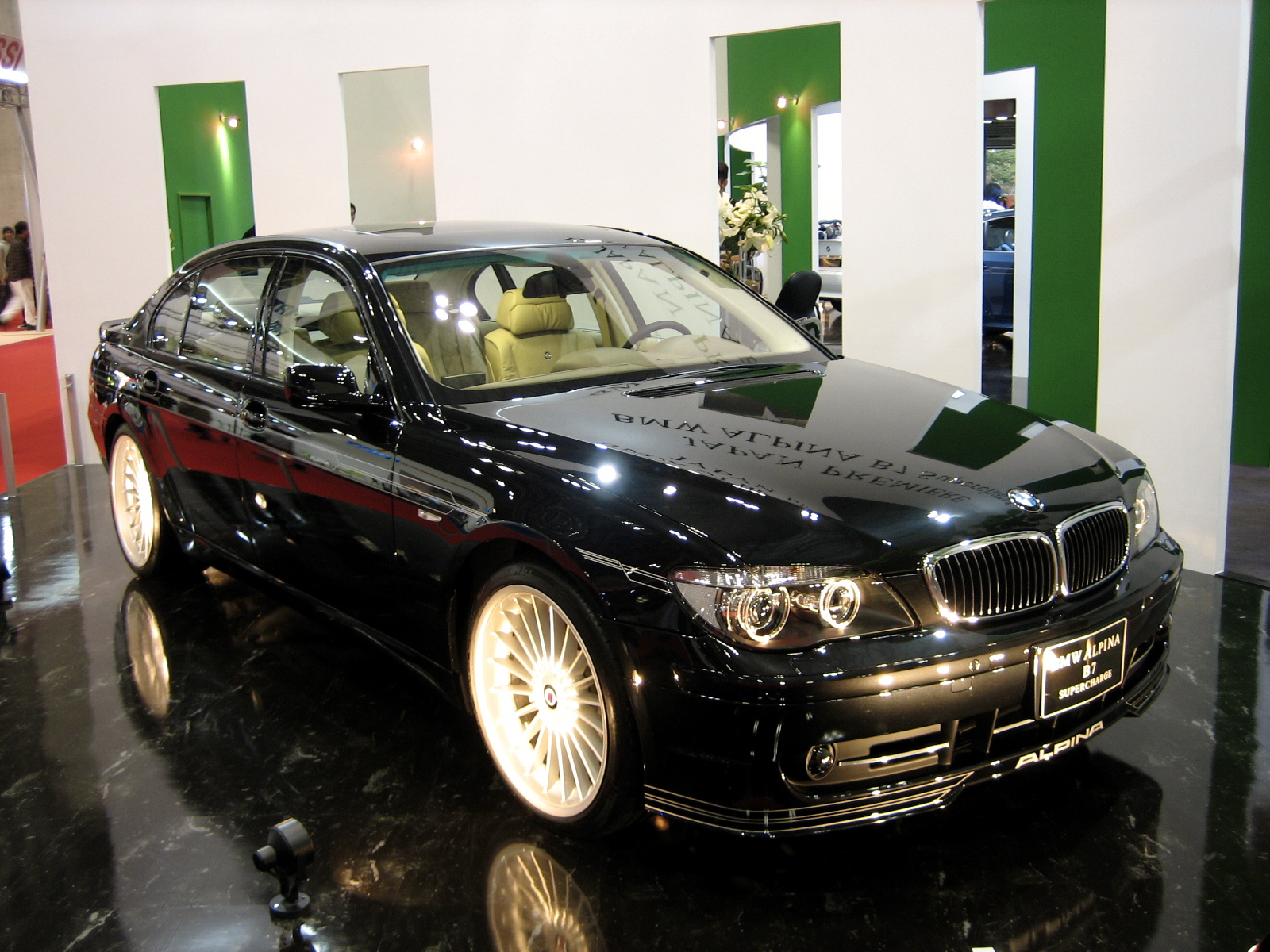
Alpina B7 (E65) (post-facelift)

The B7 can accelerate from 0–97 km/h (0–60 mph) in 4.8 seconds, can complete the 1/4 mile in 12.8 seconds and can attain a top speed of 299 km/h (186 mph). Independent testing showed that the top speed figure quoted by the manufacturer was conservative as the B7 attained a top speed of 311 km/h (193 mph), thus outclassing its BMW counter-parts in terms of performance. The B7 attained 0.91 g on the skidpad.

== Recall ==
A recall was issued for the post face-lift 2005–2008 BMW 7 Series models and the B7 equipped with Comfort Access and soft closing doors options. The problem was that the doors could unexpectedly open due to certain driving conditions, increasing the risk of the ejection of occupants. The problem affected a combined total of 45,500 cars.
