= Alpina B5 =

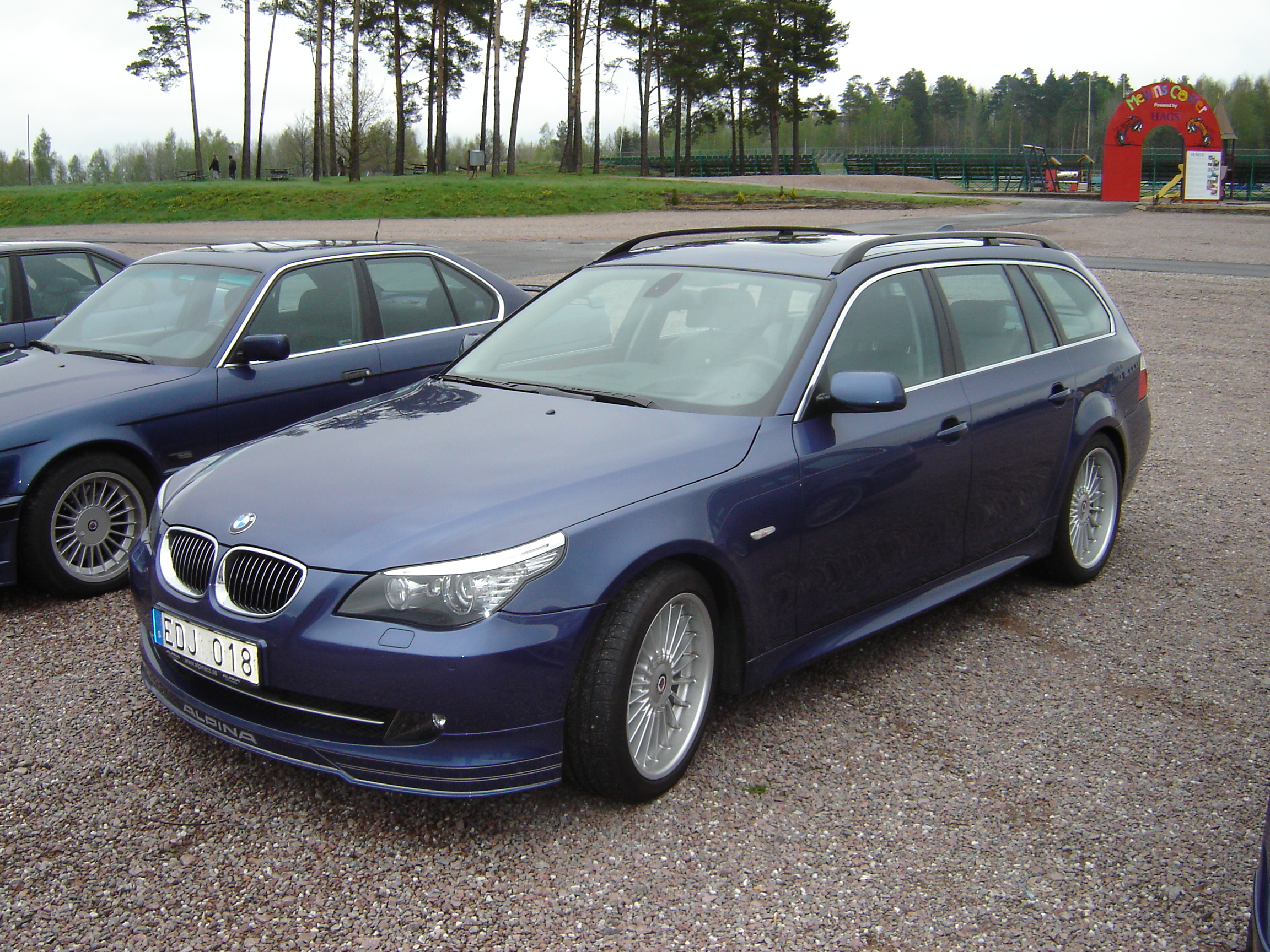
- B5 E60 touring wagon

Overview
- Manufacturer: Alpina
- Production: 2005-2024

Body and chassis
- Class: Executive car (E)

Chronology
- Predecessor: Alpina B10

The Alpina B5 and D5 are a series of high performance executive cars manufactured by German automobile manufacturer Alpina, which is based on the BMW 5 Series of the car manufacturer BMW.

== First generation (E60; 2005-2011) ==
The E60 is the first generation of B5, which was produced from 2005 to 2011.

== Second generation (F10; 2011-2016) ==
The F10 is the second generation of B5, which was produced from 2011 to 2016. Alpina produced two variants of the F10/F11 5 Series, the petrol-engined B5 and diesel-engined D5.

== Third generation (G30; 2017-2024) ==
The third generation of the B5 is based on the BMW 5 Series (G30) presented in October 2016. It was presented at the Geneva Motor Show in March 2017 and was launched in September 2017 at prices starting at €112,000. The B5 features a 4.4-litre N63M30 V8 engine that generates a maximum power output of 447 kW (599 hp; 608 PS) and 800 N⋅m (590 lb⋅ft) of torque.
