= BMW N62 =

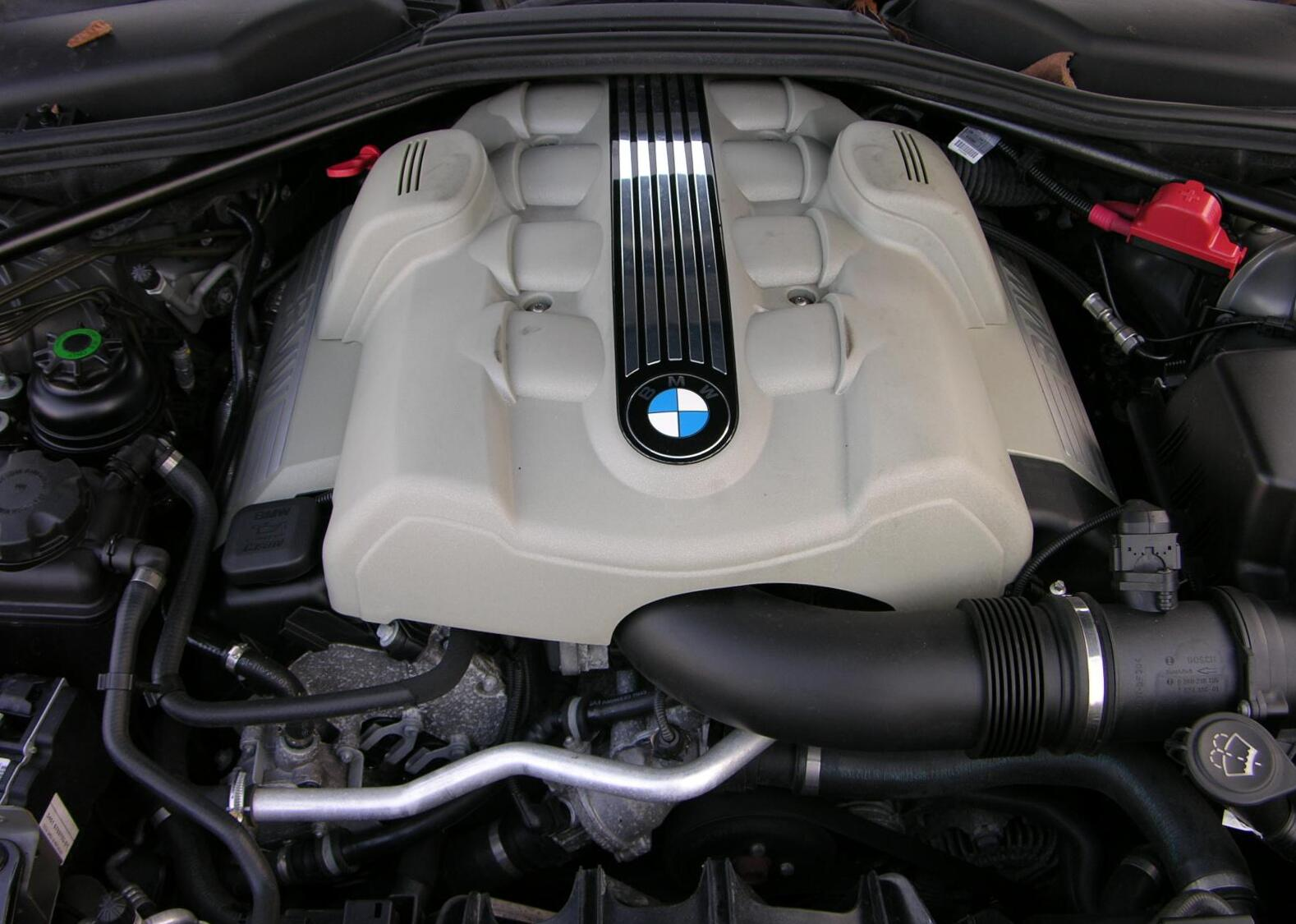
- BMW N62 on a BMW 645Ci convertible

Overview
- Production: 2001-2010

Layout
- Configuration: Naturally aspirated 90° V8
- Displacement: 3.6 L (3,600 cc); 4.0 L (4,000 cc); 4.4 L (4,398 cc); 4.8 L (4,799 cc)
- Cylinder bore: 84 mm (3.31 in); 87 mm (3.43 in); 92 mm (3.62 in); 93 mm (3.7 in)
- Piston stroke: 81.2 mm (3.20 in); 84.1 mm (3.31 in); 82.7 mm (3.26 in); 88.3 mm (3.48 in)
- Cylinder block material: Aluminium
- Cylinder head material: Aluminium
- Valvetrain: DOHC w/ VVT & VVL

Combustion
- Fuel system: Port injected
- Fuel type: Petrol

Chronology
- Predecessor: BMW M62
- Successor: BMW N63

The BMW N62 is a naturally aspirated V8 petrol engine which was used in BMW cars from 2001 to 2010. It also remained in small-scale production for the Morgan Aero until 2019. The N62 is the world's first engine to use a continuously variable-length intake manifold, and as of 2026 is the only production engine to feature a continuously variable length intake manifold. The N62 was also BMW's second engine, to feature variable valve lift (called Valvetronic), after the technology was first utilized on the N42 4 cylinder engine.

Unlike its predecessor and successor, there was no M version of the N62.

In the International Engine of the Year awards in 2002, the N62 was awarded "International Engine of the Year", "Best New Engine" and "Above 4-litre" categories.

== Design ==
The N62 was a clean sheet design and not a direct evolution of the M60 engine line that evolved into the M62 engine. The N62 4.4L has a bore of 92 mm (3.6 in) and stroke of 82.7 mm (3.26 in) for a total displacement of 4,398cc and features double-VANOS variable valve timing on both the intake and exhaust camshafts (the M62 features variable valve timing on only the intake camshaft). As per the M62, the N62 has double overhead camshafts (DOHC) with four valves per cylinder, an aluminium engine block and an aluminium cylinder head. The N62 4.4 featured offset fracture-split forged powdered metal connecting rods and the Valvetronic technology allowed the N62 to vary the valve lift of the engine from .03mm to 9.85mm. The redline is 6500 rpm. Valvetronic technology allows for variable valve timing, variable lift and variable duration and the N62 can therefore utilize the intake valves themselves to modulate the throttle, instead of utilizing the throttle body. The engine does feature a throttle body but this is only used for emergency applications in the event of Valvetronic failure, for certain cold start conditions and to maintain a set amount of vacuum in the intake for the emissions systems during low load conditions such as cruising on the highway or idling. The vacuum pump mounted on the bank 1 cylinder head only supplies the brake booster and certain auxiliaries with vacuum, making the use of the standard throttle body for manifold vacuum control a requirement for proper functioning of the crankcase ventilation system as well as the fuel evap valve and other emissions related systems.

The N62B44 is the only production engine in the world to feature a continuously variable length intake manifold known as the DIVA intake (not to be confused with the DISA intake as used on many other BMW production engines). The intake length path begins to shorten at 3,500 RPM and is progressively shortened until it reaches its shortest length at the engine's redline. This maximizes torque throughout the RPM range, producing a much broader torque curve and more peak HP.

Applications:

- 2004-2005 BMW 5 Series (E60) 545i
- 2004-2005 BMW 6 Series (E63) 645Ci
- 2001-2004 BMW 7 Series (E65) 745i/745Li
- 2004-2006 BMW X5 (E53) X5 4.4i and 4.8is

The N62B48 engine used in the E53 X5 4.8is was a 4.8L variant of the N62B44 which was accomplished by way of an increased bore size to 93 mm (3.7 in) and stroke to 88.3 mm (3.48 in) which increased the displacement to 4798.52 cc. The N62B48 in the E53 shared other components with the N62B44 including the DIVA intake which was replaced when the engine was evolved to the N62TU. The oil pan was modified and deepened to account for the longer stroke crankshaft, this change was applied to all N62's in October 2003 which includes the 4.4 variants in production at the time. Other changes were also made to accommodate the longer stroke crankshaft such as more traditional non-offset connecting rods.

The N62 was evolved into the N62TU beginning in model year 2005 and the 4.4 was replaced with the 4.8 variant by using the same bore and stroke from the 4.8 version in the E53 4.8is. The N62TU featured several changes over the N62B44, including different exhaust manifolds, improved catalytic converters, new pre-cat oxygen sensors, new MAF, updated engine management unit, replacement of the DIVA continuously variable length intake manifold to a DISA two-stage manifold, removal of secondary air injection ports and different heads to accommodate the removal of the secondary air injection system and the increased bore, different spark plugs and inlet and exhaust valves with a stem diameter decreased to 5mm from 6mm.

Applications:

- 2005-2010 BMW 5 Series (E60) 550i
- 2005-2010 BMW 6 Series (E63) 650i
- 2005-2008 BMW 7 Series (E65) 750i/750Li
- 2007-2010 BMW X5 (E70) X5 4.8i

The N62 makes different horsepower and torque figures in different applications mostly as a result of different exhaust manifolds and intake systems, notably because the X5 variants use a less optimized exhaust manifold which decreased the power output of the engine compared to other models. The E53 4.8is was also the only production N62 4.8 to feature the DIVA continuously variable length intake manifold; as all other production 4.8's used the two-stage DISA intake. Based on the output of production engines, the exhaust manifolds alone (E60, E63, E65 vs. X5) account for a 14 hp and 7 ft-lb difference on the 4.4 and 12hp and 11 ft-lb difference on the 4.8; and the intake manifold (4.8 E53 vs. E70) makes for a difference of approximately 5 hp and 19 ft-lb's. A properly optimized N62 4.8 using standard (non-X5) exhaust manifolds and the DIVA intake would therefore make approximately 367 hp and 380 ft-lbs, or 273 kW and 515 N-m; although this configuration was never utilized in a factory production car.

== Versions ==
Engine	Displacement	Power	Torque	Year
N62B36	3,600 cc (219.7 cu in)	200 kW (268 hp) at 6,200 rpm	360 N⋅m (266 lb⋅ft) at 3,700 rpm	2001
N62B40	4,000 cc (244.1 cu in)	225 kW (302 hp) at 6,300 rpm	390 N⋅m (288 lb⋅ft) at 3,500 rpm	2005
N62B44	4,398 cc (268.4 cu in)	235 kW (315 hp) at 6,100 rpm	440 N⋅m (325 lb⋅ft) at 3,700 rpm	2003
N62B44	4,398 cc (268.4 cu in)	245 kW (329 hp) at 6,100 rpm	450 N⋅m (332 lb⋅ft) at 3,600 rpm	2001
N62B48	4,799 cc (292.9 cu in)	265 kW (355 hp) at 6,200 rpm	500 N⋅m (369 lb⋅ft) at 3,500 rpm	2004
N62B48	4,799 cc (292.9 cu in)	261 kW (350 hp) at 6,300 rpm	475 N⋅m (350 lb⋅ft) at 3,400 rpm	2005
N62B48	4,799 cc (292.9 cu in)	270 kW (362 hp) at 6,300 rpm	490 N⋅m (361 lb⋅ft) at 3,400 rpm	2005
H1	4,398 cc (268.4 cu in)	368 kW (493 hp) at 5,500 rpm	700 N⋅m (516 lb⋅ft) at 3,500 rpm	2007
H1	4,398 cc (268.4 cu in)	390 kW (523 hp) at 5,500 rpm	725 N⋅m (535 lb⋅ft) at 4,750 rpm	2007

=== N62B36 ===
The N62B36 is a 3,600 cc (219.7 cu in) version. Bore is 84 mm (3.3 in) and stroke is 81.2 mm (3.2 in). It produces 200 kW (270 hp) at 6,200 rpm and 360 N⋅m (270 lb⋅ft) at 4,250 rpm.

Applications:

- 2001-2005 E65/E66 735i/735Li

=== N62B40 ===
The N62B40 is a TU variant which replaced the 3.6L 4,000 cc (244.1 cu in) version. Bore is 87 mm (3.4 in) and stroke is 84.1 mm (3.3 in). It produces 225 kW (302 hp) at 6,300 rpm and 390 N⋅m (290 lb⋅ft) at 3,500 rpm.

Applications:

- 2005-2010 E60/E61 540i sedan and touring
- 2005-2008 E65/E66 740i/740Li sedan

=== N62B44 ===
The N62B44 is a 4,398 cc (268.4 cu in) version, utilizing a bore of 92 mm (3.6 in) and stroke of 82.7 mm (3.3 in).

Applications - 235 kW (315 hp) version:

- 2003-2006 E53 X5 4.4i

Applications - 245 kW (329 hp) version:

- 2001-2005 E65/E66 745i/745Li
- 2003-2005 E60/E61 545i
- 2003-2005 E63/E64 645Ci
- 2005-2007 Morgan Aero 8 Series 2 and Series 3

=== N62B48 ===
The N62B48 has a displacement of 4,799 cc (292.9 cu in), a bore of 93 mm (3.7 in) and a stroke of 88.3 mm (3.5 in).

Applications- 261 kW (350 hp) version:

- 2007–2010 E70 X5 4.8i SAV

Applications- 265 kW (355 hp) version:

- 2003–2011 Wiesmann GT MF4 / Roadster MF4
- 2004-2006 E53 X5 4.8iS SAV

Applications- 270 kW (362 hp) version:

- 2005-2010 E60/E61 550i sedan and touring
- 2005–2010 E63/E64 650i coupé and convertible
- 2005-2008 E65/E66 750i/750Li
- 2008–2010 Morgan Aero 8 Series 4, Series 5, Aeromax, and Aero Coupe
- 2010–2015 Morgan Aero SuperSports

=== Alpina H1 ===
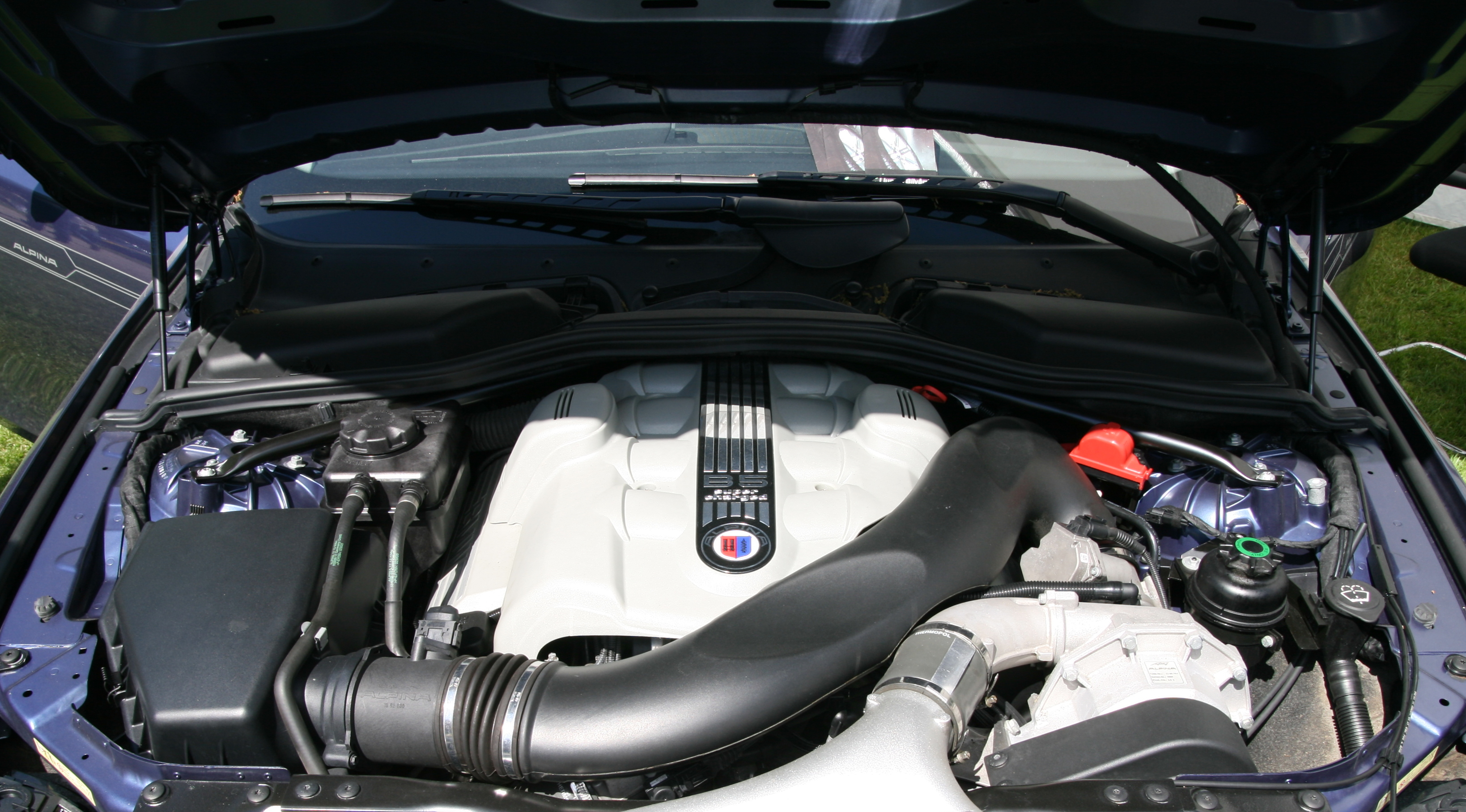
Alpina H1-engine in BMW E60

The H1 is a version of the N62B44 made by Alpina. The H1 is based on an N62B44 block with a forged crankshaft from Alpina, high strength Mahle pistons and the addition of an ASA centrifugal supercharger. The H1 has a redline of 6,200 rpm.

Applications- 368 kW

- 2005–2007 in the Alpina B5 (E60/E61)
- 2006–2007 in the Alpina B6 (E63)
- 2003–2008 in the Alpina B7 (E65)

Applications- 390 kW

- 2007–2010 in the Alpina B5 S (E60/E61)
- 2007–2010 in the Alpina B6 S (E63)

== See also ==
- List of BMW engines
