= Alpina B7 (G12) =

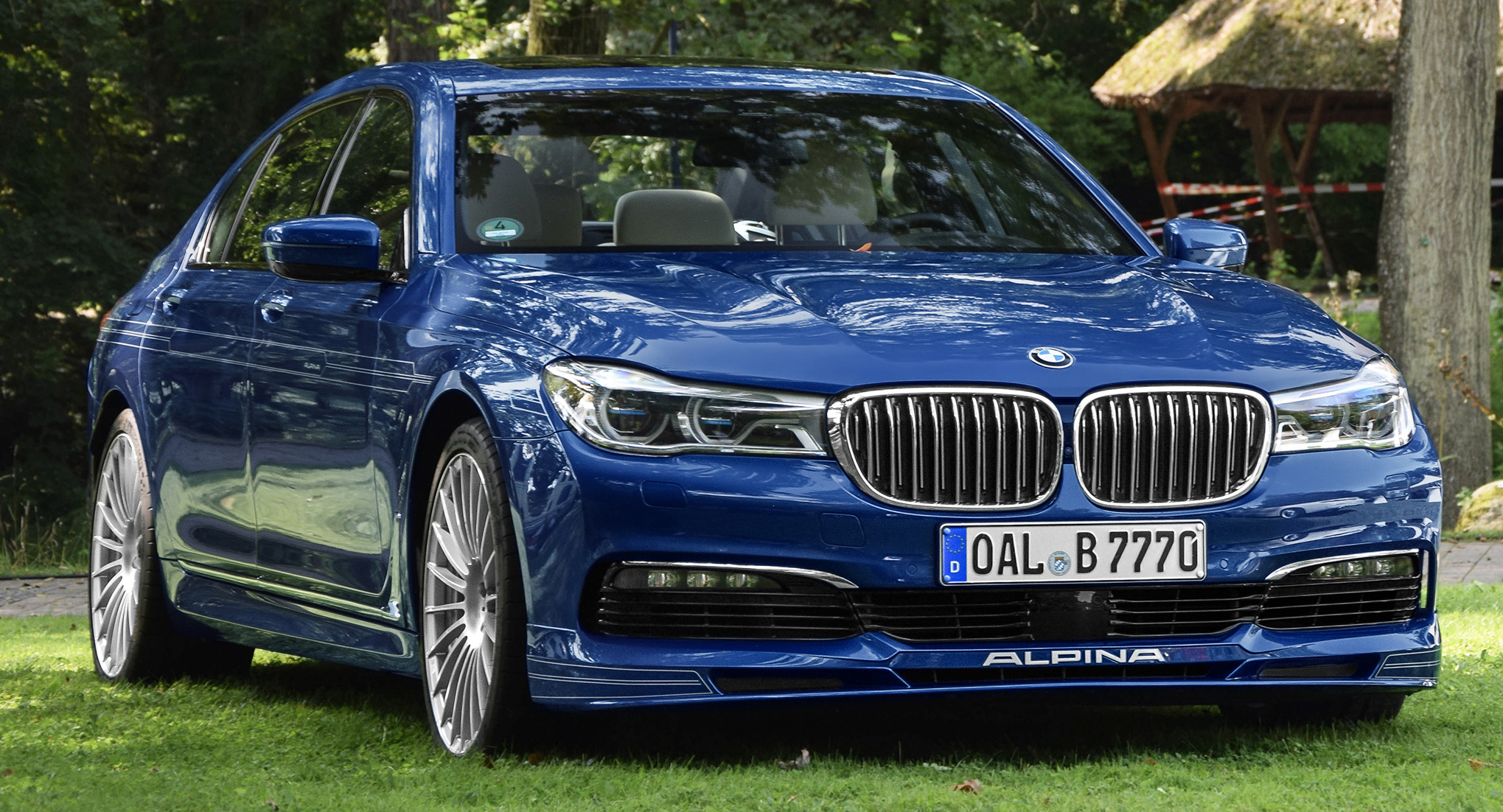

Overview
- Manufacturer: Alpina
- Production: 2016–2022
- Assembly: Germany: Dingolfing (initial assembly); Buchloe (final assembly)

Body and chassis
- Class: Full-size luxury car (F)
- Body style: 4-door (LWB) sedan
- Layout: Front-engine, rear-wheel-drive; Front-engine, four-wheel-drive (xDrive)
- Related: BMW 7 Series (G11)

Powertrain
- Engine: 4.4 L BMW N63M30 twin-turbocharged V8
- Power output: 447 kW (608 PS; 599 hp)
- Transmission: 8-speed ZF 8HP automatic

Dimensions
- Wheelbase: 3,210 mm (126 in)
- Length: 5,238 mm (206 in)
- Width: 1,902 mm (75 in)
- Height: 1,479 mm (58 in)
- Kerb weight: 2,110 kg (4,652 lb)

Chronology
- Predecessor: Alpina B7 (F01)

The Alpina B7 Bi-Turbo (G12) (also known as the Alpina B7) is the fifth generation of the Alpina B7, a high-performance executive car released by German automobile manufacturer Alpina. Based on the BMW 7 Series (G12), the B7 Bi-Turbo was introduced at the 2016 Geneva Motor Show. Known as the B7 in North America, the car is the third B7 model to be imported to the United States. The Alpina B7 was discontinued in September 2022.

== B7 Bi-Turbo (2016–2019) ==
=== Overview ===
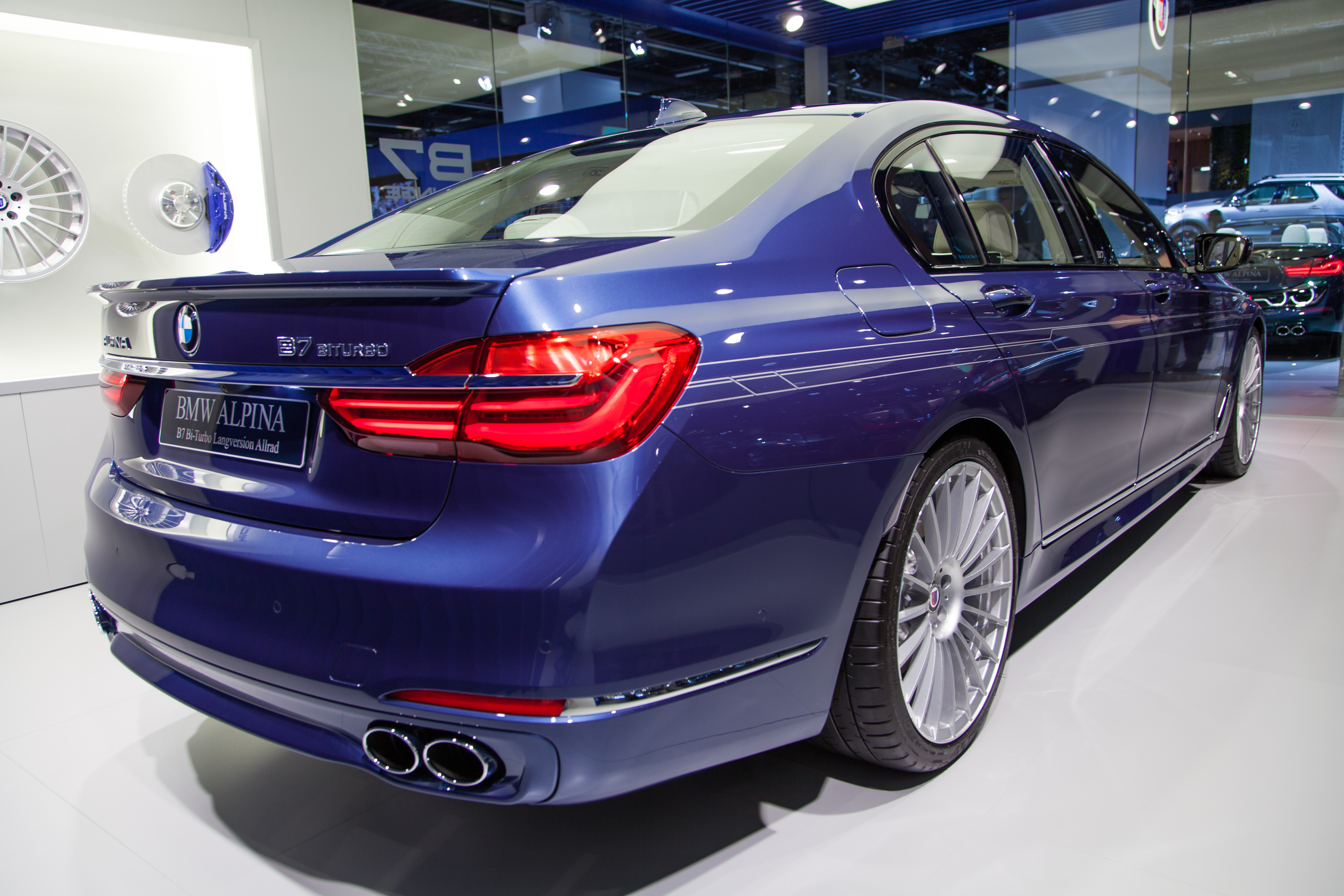
Alpina B7 (G12) rear view

The B7 Bi-Turbo is based on the 750Li and uses a modified version of its 4.4-litre twin-turbocharged V8 engine designated the N63M30. The engine is modified by the addition of modified twin-scroll turbochargers having larger inlet and outer dimensions and new compressors for an increased boost pressure of 1.4 bar (20 psi), replacement of the standard pistons with high-strength MAHLE pistons, new NGK spark plugs, a new air-to-water intercooler making use of short charge air intake paths to feed air to the air intake manifold, a revised cooling system with large diameter hoses for uninterrupted flow and additional external water and oil coolers. These modifications allow the engine to generate a power output of 608 PS (447 kW; 600 hp) at 6,250 rpm and 800 N⋅m (590 lb⋅ft) of torque between 3,000 and 5,000 rpm. 670 N⋅m (494 lb⋅ft) of torque is achieved at 2,000 rpm. The engine has a compression ratio of 10.0:1.

The B7 Bi-Turbo has a specially developed stainless steel exhaust system with quad-round exhaust tips and electronically controlled bypass valves controlled by the Driving Dynamic Control knob near the gear selector.

The B7 Bi-Turbo uses the same ZF 8-speed automatic transmission as used on a standard 750i but has a reprogrammed Alpina software for faster shift times. The transmission also has a reinforced torque converter, an extra oil cooler and planetary wheels. The shift paddles are however replaced by shift buttons behind the steering wheel but the car can be ordered with the shift paddles as well.

The B7 Bi-Turbo is available in all-wheel-drive drivetrain. Alpina has recalibrated the xDrive system used in the 750i especially the air suspension system which can be controlled using the Dynamic Control knob. The suspension now has Active Comfort Drive with Road Preview, Active Roll Stabilisation and Integral active Steering on the rear axle. The all-wheel-drive system has a heavy bias towards the rear wheels.

Integral Active Steering has a variable ratio electric steering system on the front axle and the active steering on the rear axle. The system works by steering the rear wheels opposite to the front axle for better turn in at low speeds and turning the rear wheels in unison with the front wheels at high speeds for better stability.

The calibrated air suspension lowers the car by 20 mm (0.8 in) at speeds above 225 km/h (140 mph) for improved performance. The suspension can also be lowered manually by the same height at low speeds or can be raised for ground clearance by 20 mm (0.8 in). The car has two new driving modes, Comfort + and the Sport + with the latter enabling the car to give maximum performance.

The multi-spoke alloy wheels on the car measure 20x8.5-inch at the front and 20x10-inch at the rear wrapped in Michelin Pilot Super Sport tyres. 21-inch forged multi-spoke alloy wheels and tyres are available as an option, the use of conventional tyres over run flats is claimed to save 2.5 kg (5.5 lb) of unsprung weight per wheel (2.5 kg (5.5 lb)) from the wheel 2 kg (4.4 lb) from the tyre). The brake discs measure 395 mm (16 in) at the front and 370 mm (15 in) at the rear. The callipers are four-piston fixed units at the front and two-piston floating units at the rear finished in Alpina Blue paint. The brakes are supplied by Brembo.

The interior of the car is upholstered in Lavalina leather or Tartufo leather upholstery and is finished in a customer specific colour. Several options are available for the interior trim, including the Alpina specific Piano black or Myrtle wood. A metal production plaque located on the centre console has the founder's signature and the car's production number. The interior also comes with floor mats having the Alpina logo, Alpina kickplates and illuminated Alpina door sills. The digital instrument cluster is a bespoke unit especially developed for the B7 with changing displays depending on the selected driving mode. Other creature comforts are the same as offered on the 750i.

The exterior changes apart from the wheels include a front chin spoiler and a rear lip spoiler, integrated brake cooling ducts in the front bumper and recalibrated active grille shutters in the twin kidney grille. The B7 is available in Alpina Blue Metallic and Alpina Green Metallic exterior colours along with exterior colours offered by BMW.

=== Performance ===
The B7 Bi-Turbo can accelerate to 97 km/h (60 mph) in 3.6 seconds and to 100 km/h (62 mph) in 3.7 seconds from a standstill, to 161 km/h (100 mph) in 8.8 seconds and can complete the quarter-mile in 11.9 seconds. The car has a tested top speed of 330 km/h (205 mph), although it is limited to 310 km/h (193 mph) in North America.

=== Right-hand-drive variant ===
The B7 became available in right-hand drive markets in 2017. The switch to a right-hand-drive variant needed different engineering, which is why it is offered in a rear-wheel drive layout only. As a consequence, this version of the B7 Bi-Turbo accelerates to 100 km/h (62 mph) in 4.2 seconds.

=== Chinese version ===
Due to taxes on larger engines, the Chinese variant of the B7 Bi-Turbo is offered with a 4.0-litre V8 engine having a power output of 564 PS (415 kW; 556 hp) and 750 N⋅m (553 lb⋅ft) of torque. The Chinese B7 Bi-Turbo accelerates to 100 km/h (62 mph) from a standstill in 3.8 seconds and has a top speed of 315 km/h (196 mph).

=== B7 Exclusive Edition ===
The B7 Exclusive Edition is a special edition model developed for the Canadian market. Introduced in 2018, the Exclusive Edition has significant changes over the standard B7 those being black chrome elements and badging on the exterior, deep black 21-inch Alpina Classic multi-spoke alloy wheels, black chrome exhaust tips and the choice of three exterior colours; Frozen Black, Frozen Grey and Black Sapphire metallic. The interior is upholstered in BMW Individual Merino leather with contrast stitching. Other changes to the interior include Alpina floor mats, Alpina embossed head rests and a special metallic plaque on the centre console signifying the car's production number. Other modifications and performance remain the same as a standard B7. Only 7 units of each of the three colours would be produced making the total production count to 21 cars. The B7 Exclusive Edition is sold through BMW Canada.

== Facelift (2019–2022) ==
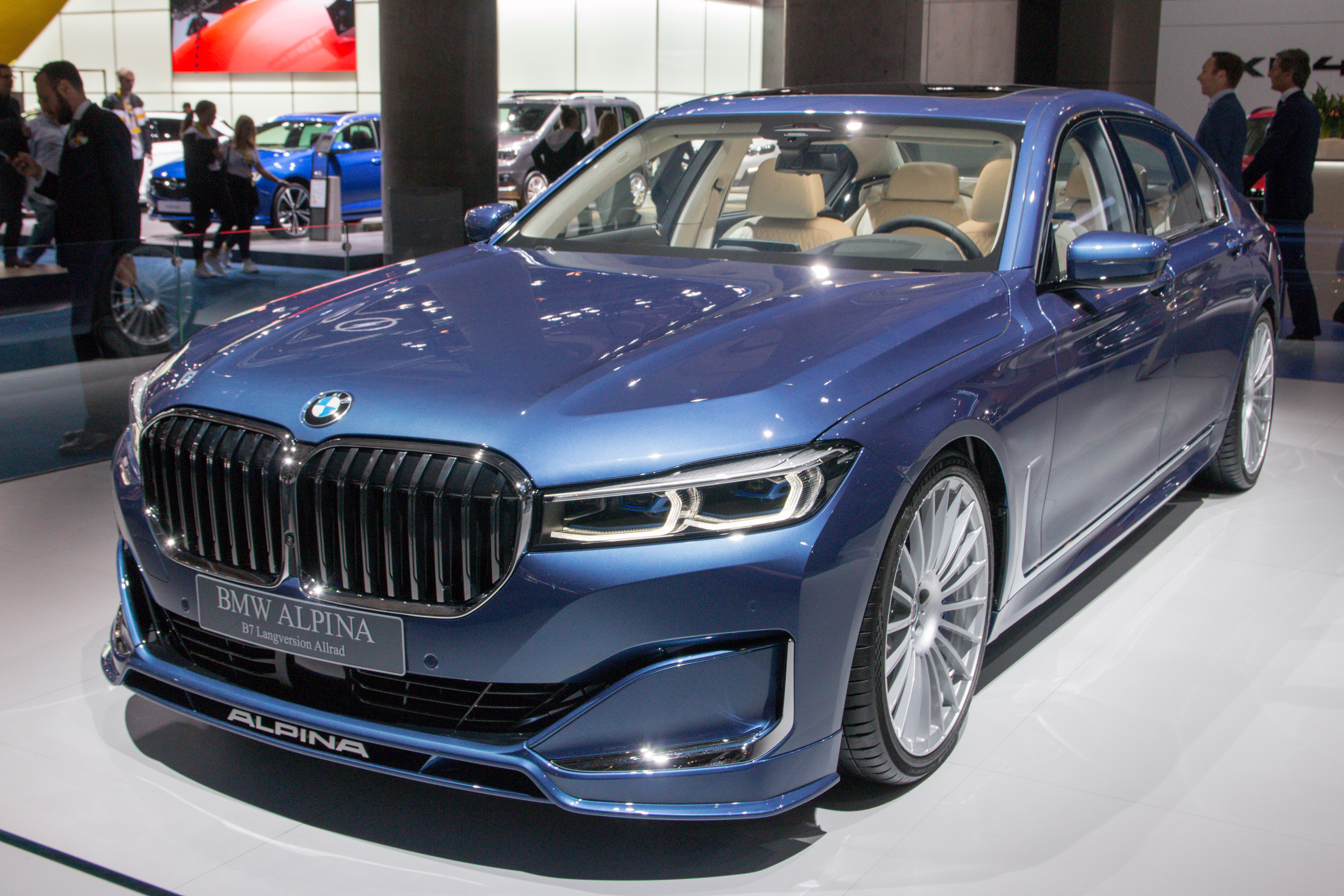
Alpina B7 (post-facelift)

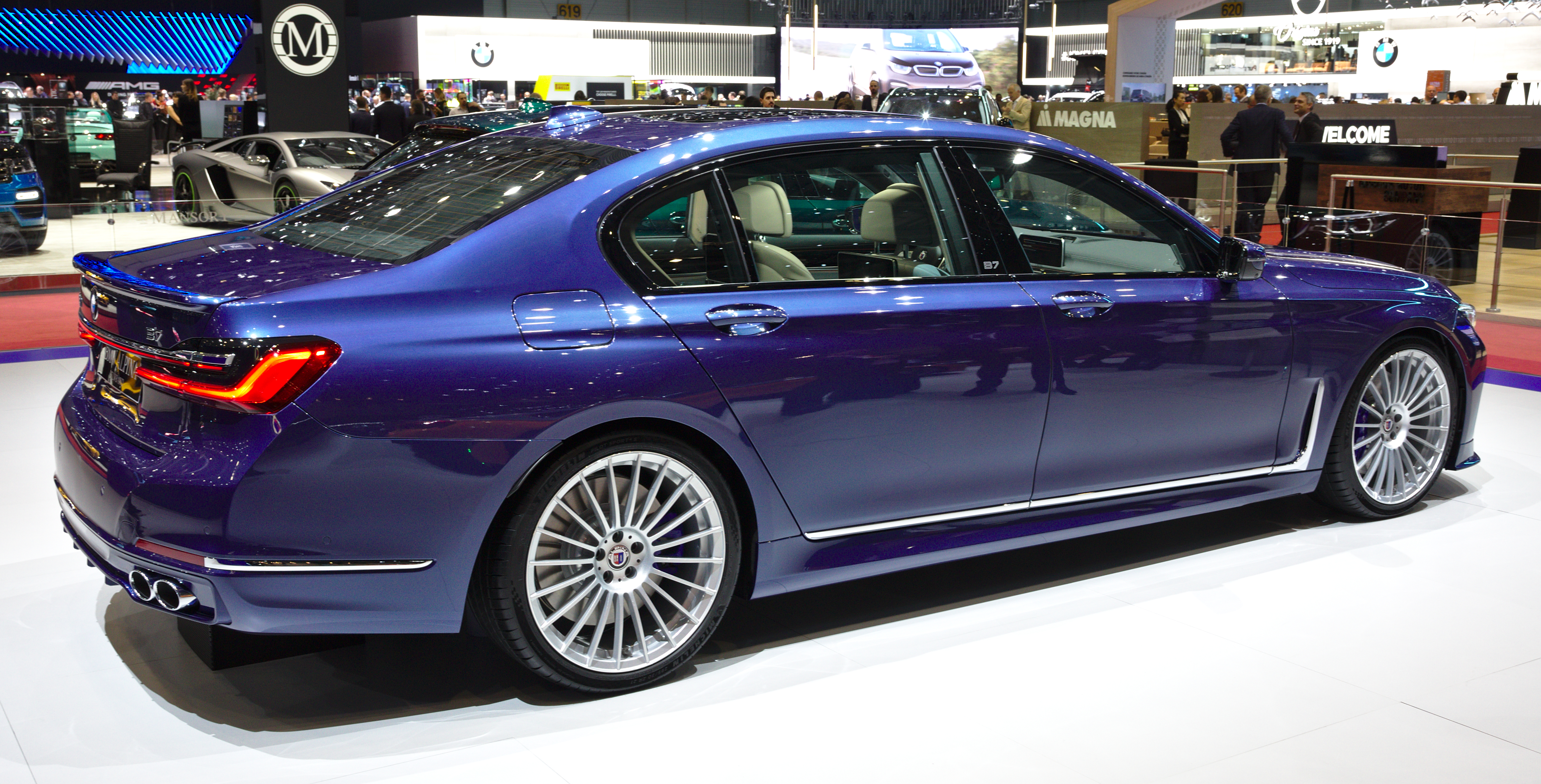
Rear view

The facelift model of the B7, based on facelift 750Li was unveiled on 11 February 2019. The power band of the engine is improved, with a power output of 608 PS (447 kW; 600 hp) between 5,500 and 6,500 rpm and the maximum 800 N⋅m (590 lb⋅ft) torque now being available from 2,000 rpm. The car can accelerate from 0–100 km/h (62 mph) in 3.6 seconds whilst the top speed is 330 km/h (205 mph). The 0–200 km/h (124 mph) acceleration has improved and is now achieved in 11.7 seconds instead of 12.5 seconds. The car was presented to the public at the 2019 Geneva Motor Show and deliveries began in July of the same year.

== Production ==
Like its predecessors, the current generation of the B7 is initially assembled alongside the 7 Series models at the BMW Dingolfing plant. The handbuilt engine is sent to BMW to be fitted in the car, the car is then sent back to Alpina for final assembly at Buchloe. The B7 is sold alongside the 7 Series at BMW dealerships in the United States but is sold exclusively through Alpina dealerships in Europe.
