= Alpina B5 (F10) =

BMW 5 series variant manufactured by Alpina

Alpina B5 and D5 (F10)
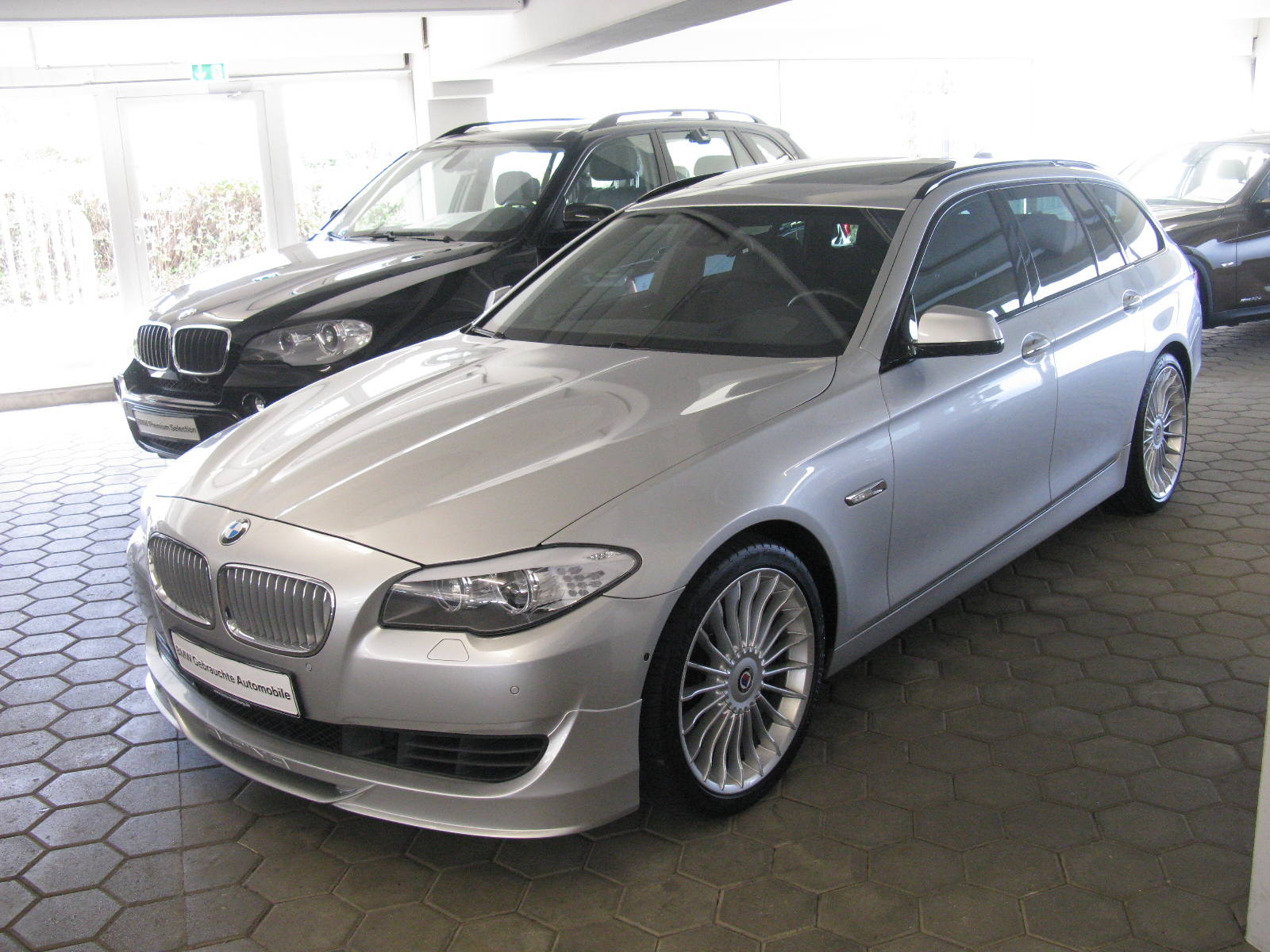
- Alpina B5 'Touring' (wagon)

Overview
- Manufacturer: Alpina Burkard Bovensiepen GmbH & Co. KG
- Also called: Alpina B5 Bi-Turbo
- Production: 2011–2016
- Assembly: Germany: Buchloe

Body and chassis
- Class: Executive car (E)
- Body style: 4-door saloon (F10); 5-door station wagon (F11)
- Layout: Front-engine, rear-wheel-drive
- Related: BMW 5 Series (F10); Alpina B7 (F01); Alpina B6 (F12)

Powertrain
- Engine: Petrol 4.4 L BMW N63 twin-turbocharged V8; Diesel 3.0 L N57 turbodiesel I6
- Transmission: 8-speed ZF 8HP automatic

Dimensions
- Wheelbase: 2,968 mm (117 in)
- Length: 4,899 mm (193 in)
- Width: 1,860 mm (73 in)
- Height: 1,464–1,491 mm (58–59 in)
- Kerb weight: Saloon: 2,045 kg (4,508 lb); Wagon: 2,140 kg (4,718 lb)

Chronology
- Predecessor: Alpina B5 (E60)
- Successor: Alpina B5 (G30)

The Alpina B5 and D5 (F10) (also called the B5/D5 Bi-Turbo) are a series of high performance executive cars manufactured by German automobile manufacturer Alpina from 2011 to 2016. Introduced at the 2010 Goodwood Festival of Speed, the car is the second generation of the B5 and succeeds the B5 (E60). Based on the BMW 5 Series (F10), the car was available in saloon and wagon bodystyles.

== Overview ==
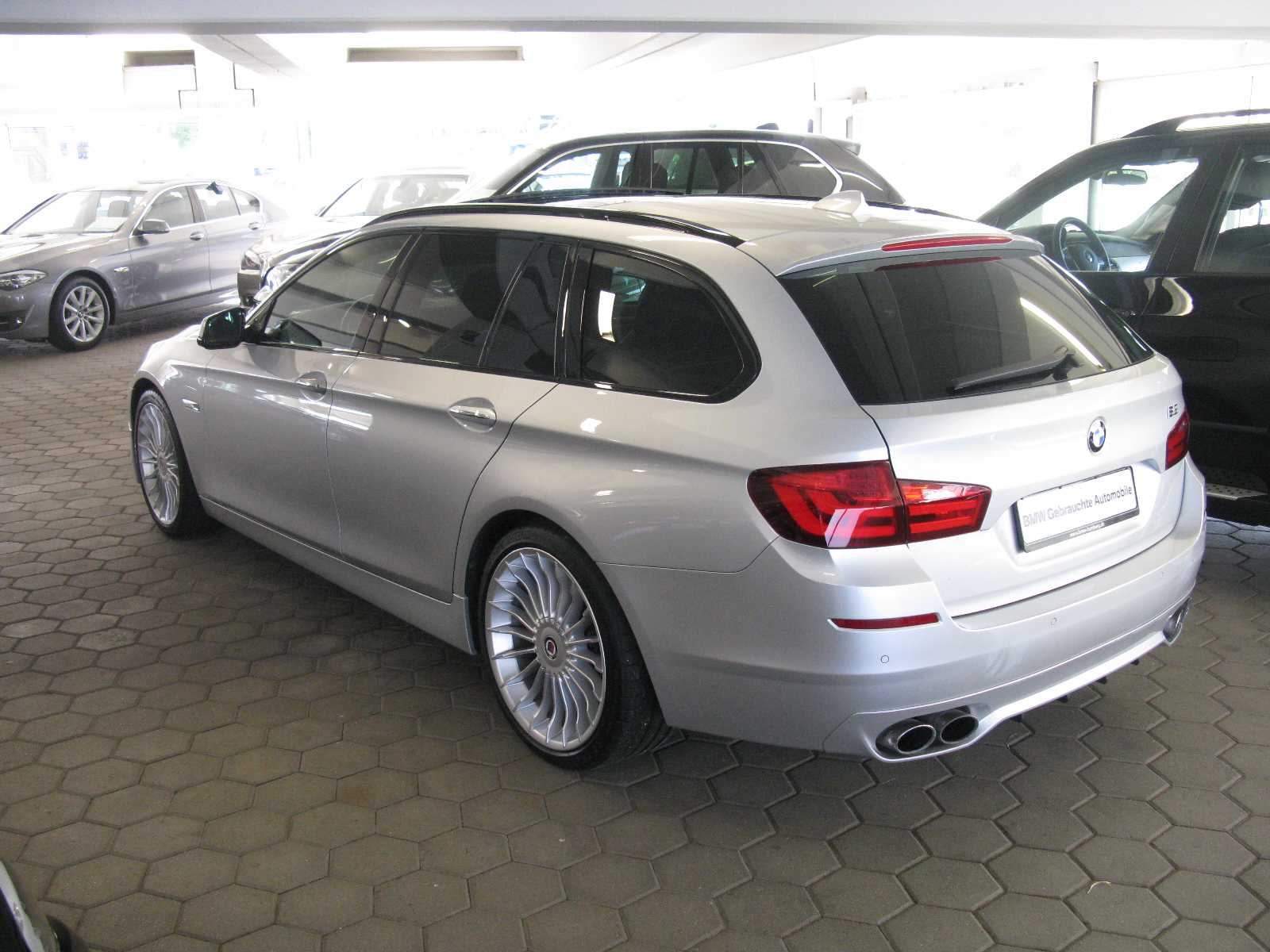
Rear view (wagon; Pre-facelift)

The B5 is based on the 550i and uses a modified variant of its 4.4-litre twin-turbocharged N63 V8 engine. The modifications include large 44 mm (2 in) Honeywell turbochargers, reinforced cylinder heads, NGK spark plugs, high strength MAHLE pistons and an Alpina specific ECU. The maximum boost pressure of the turbochargers is increased to 14.5 psi. These modifications allow the engine to generate a power output of 507 PS (373 kW; 500 hp) at 5,500 rpm and 700 N⋅m (516 lb⋅ft) of torque. The same engine is also shared with the B7 and the B6 convertible. The engine is mated to a modified 8-speed automatic transmission manufactured by ZF Friedrichshafen called the "Switch Tronic" gearbox by Alpina. The transmission has a manual shifting mode which allows the driver to change gears using two aluminium buttons on the back of the steering wheel. The engine and transmission in conjunction allow the B5 to achieve a fuel economy of 10.8 litres/100 km.

The B5 came with a softer suspension system which has shorter springs and modified dampers along with suspension arms. The dampers are electronically adjustable and have four settings namely Normal, Comfort, Sport and Sport +. The car has 20-inch multi-spoke alloy wheels with Michelin Pilot Sport tyres having sizes of 255/35ZR20 at the front and 285/30ZR20 at the rear.

The steering system of the 550i was also modified in order for smoother handling and elimination of under and oversteer. The exhaust system, shared with the B6, is a titanium unit from Akrapovic with quad-exhaust tips and electronically controlled bypass valves. The B5 has an aerodynamic kit that includes a carbon-fibre front spoiler with an integrated front splitter along with an integrated NACA brake cooling duct, a rear lip spoiler and an optional rear diffuser.

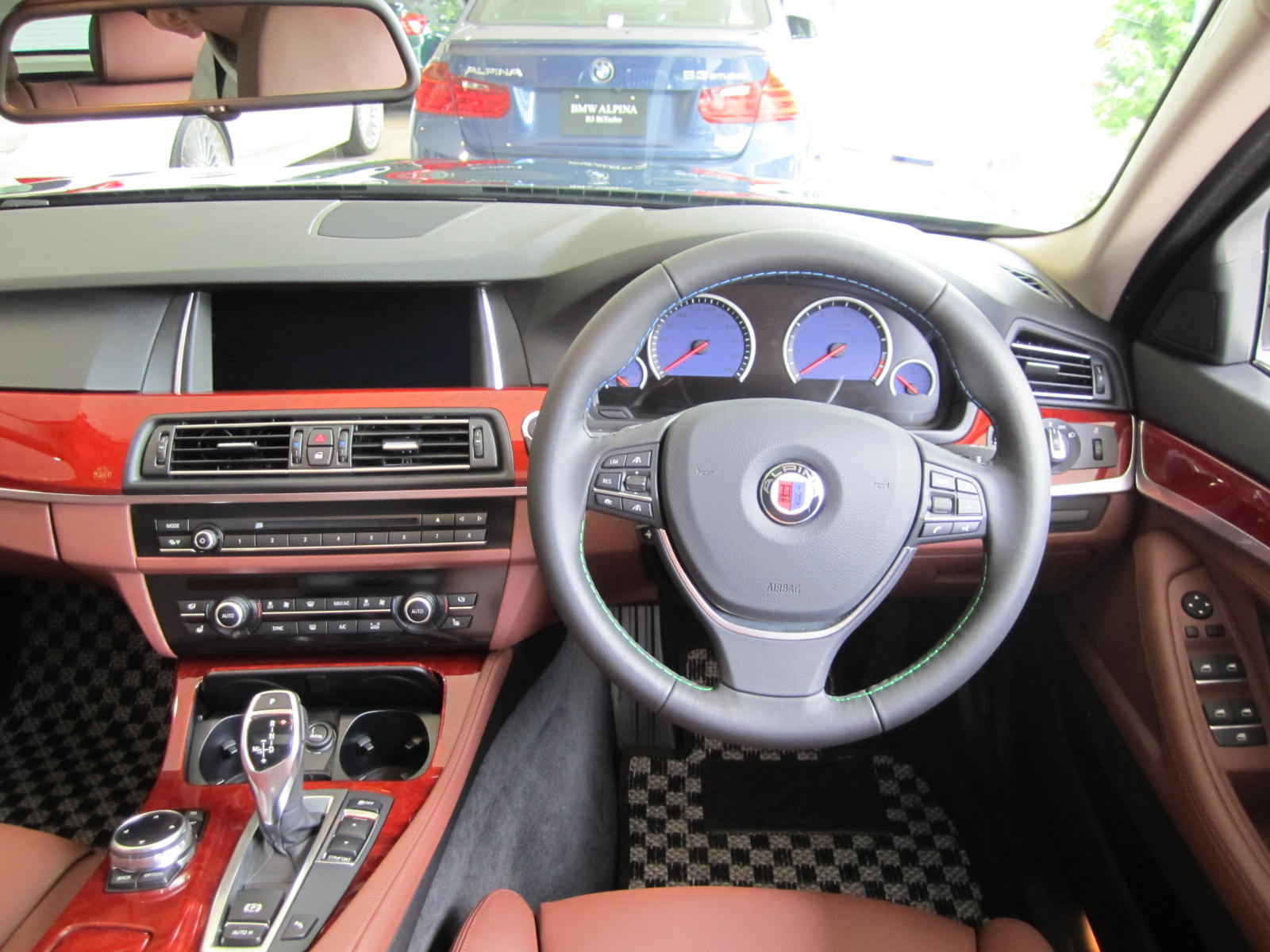
Interior

The car has Lavalina leather interior upholstery and myrtle wood trim as standard. The interior has Alpina logos and emblems throughout along with illuminated door sills, a panoramic roof, Alpina gauges, BMW driver assistance including active blind spot detection and a sports steering wheel.

Manufacturer estimated performance figures include a 0–100 km/h (0–62 mph) acceleration time of 4.7 seconds (4.8 seconds for the wagon) and a top speed of 307 km/h (191 mph) (303 km/h (188 mph) for the wagon)

=== Facelift ===
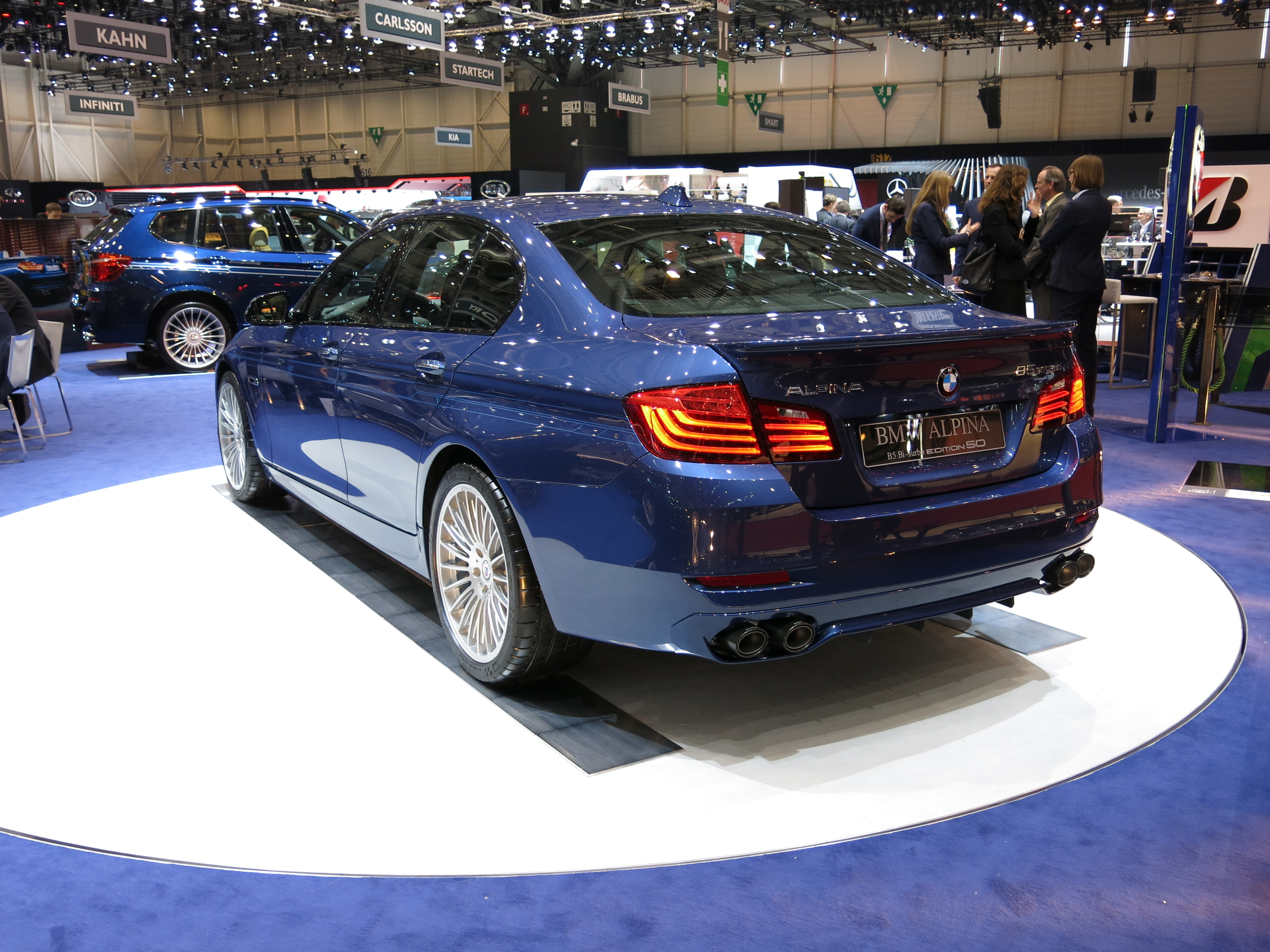
Rear view (saloon; Post facelift)

The B5 was updated in 2012 and was now based on the LCI 550i. The updated variant was unveiled at the 2012 Geneva Motor Show. The engine was modified and has a power output of 540 PS (397 kW; 533 hp) between 5,200 and 6,250 rpm and 733 N⋅m (541 lb⋅ft) of torque at 2,800 rpm. A notable feature of the engine was the use of direct fuel injection which reduced gear shift timing to 180 milliseconds. Other components, such as the aero kit and the transmission were un-altered.

The modifications to the engine allowed the B5 to accelerate to 100 km/h (62 mph) in of 4.5 seconds (4.6 seconds for the wagon) and a top speed of 319 km/h (198 mph) (315 km/h (196 mph) for the wagon)

The B5 was updated again in 2016 and now shared the same enhancements as the B5 Edition 50 (described below) resulting to the same performance as the limited-edition model.

== Variants ==
=== D5 ===
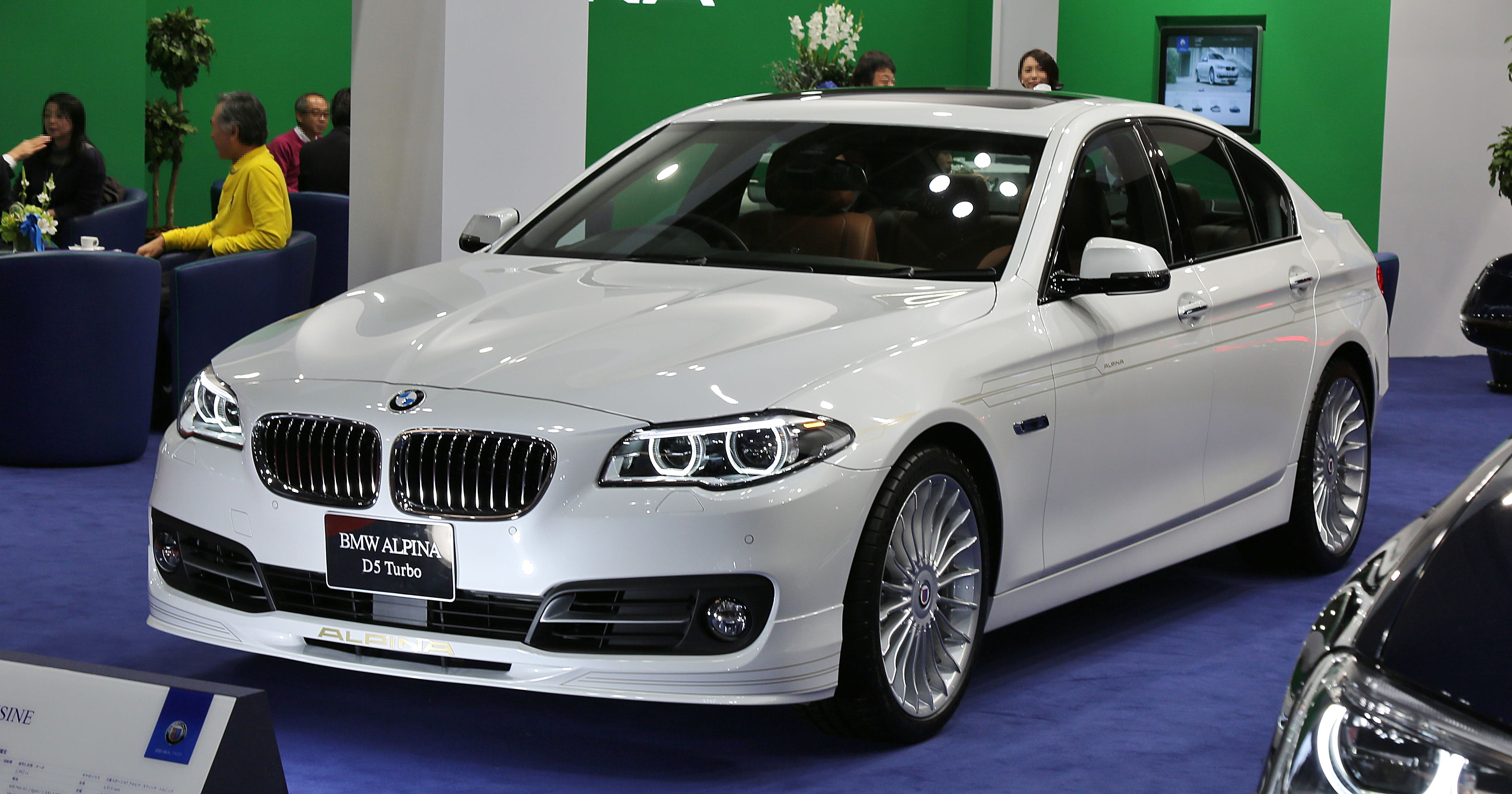
Alpina D5 (saloon)

The D5 is the diesel powered variant of the B5. Based on the 535d, the D5 uses a modified variant of the 3.0-litre turbodiesel N57 straight-6 engine. The engine has a power output of 352 PS (259 kW; 347 hp) and 700 N⋅m (516 lb⋅ft) of torque and has a red-line of 5,000 rpm. The aerodynamic kit, interior and transmission are shared with the B5.

The D5 can accelerate to 100 km/h (62 mph) from a standstill in 5.1 seconds and can attain a top speed of 275 km/h (171 mph).

=== Edition 50 ===
The B5 Edition 50 is a limited production variant of the B5 developed to celebrate the 50th anniversary of Alpina. The B5 has an upgraded engine and the turbochargers have an increased boost pressure of 1.2 bar (17.4 psi). Other engine modifications include shorter intakes, the addition of three intercoolers (one air intercooler, two water intercoolers), lighter pistons and an updated ECU. The engine has a power output of 600 PS (441 kW; 592 hp) and 800 N⋅m (590 lb⋅ft) of torque.

The Edition 50 has new forged aluminium alloy wheels which save 7.6 kg (17 lb) at the front and 8 kg (18 lb) at the rear. The switch to a titanium Akrapovic exhaust system saves a further 17 kg (37 lb) of weight while also reducing back pressure.

The modifications allow the Edition 50 to accelerate to 100 km/h (62 mph) from a standstill in 4.2 seconds and attain a top speed of 328 km/h (204 mph).

The Edition 50 was available either in Alpina Green or Blue. A bespoke colour called Edition 50 Sepia was also available through BMW Individual. The interior had a Forest Green and black Nappa leather upholstery with contrast yellow stitching and ceramic finishing on the centre console paying homage to the 1982 B7 S Turbo. The stainless steel Edition 50 door sills had founder Burkard Bovensiepen's signature. The car had a plaque signifying the production number of the 50 units produced.
