= Alpina B6 (F12) =

German automobile

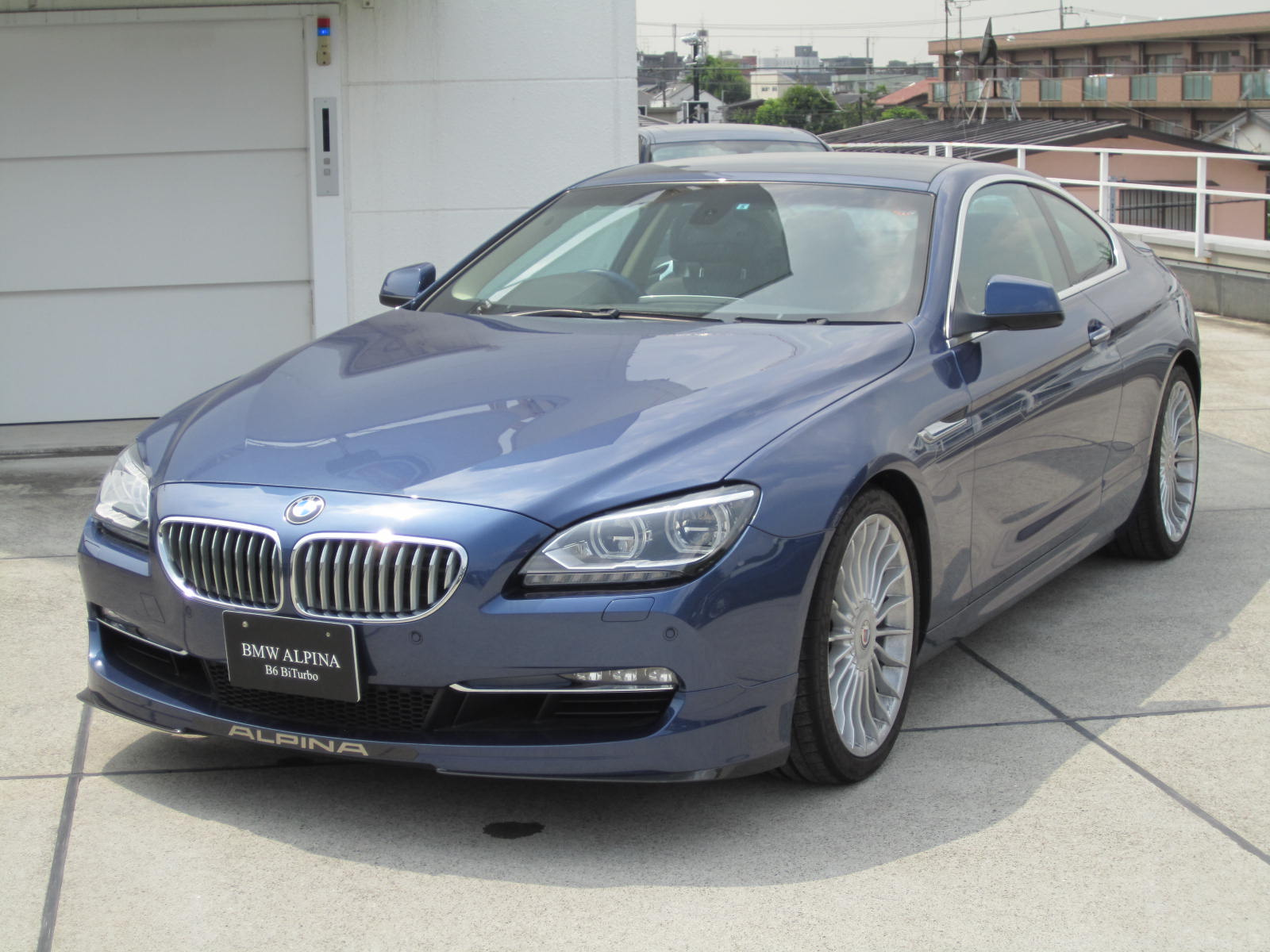
- Alpina B6 (F13)

Overview
- Manufacturer: Alpina Burkard Bovensiepen GmbH & Co. KG
- Production: 2011–2019
- Assembly: Germany: Buchloe

Body and chassis
- Class: Grand tourer (S) (coupé/convertible); Executive car (E) (Gran Coupé)
- Body style: 2-door coupé; 2-door convertible; 4-door saloon (gran coupé)
- Layout: Front-engine, rear-wheel-drive Front-engine, all-wheel-drive (xDrive, Gran Coupé only)
- Related: BMW 6 Series (F06/F12/F13); Alpina B7 (F01); Alpina B5 (F10)

Powertrain
- Engine: 4.4 L BMW N63 twin-turbocharged V8
- Transmission: 8-speed ZF 8HP70 automatic

Dimensions
- Length: 5,007 mm (197.1 in) (F06); 4,894 mm (192.7 in) (F12/F13)
- Width: 1,894 mm (74.6 in)
- Height: 1,365–1,392 mm (53.7–54.8 in)
- Kerb weight: Coupé: 1,945 kg (4,288 lb) (dry) 2,320 kg (5,115 lb) (max weight); Convertible: 2,095 kg (4,619 lb) (dry) 2,430 kg (5,357 lb) (max weight); Saloon (Gran Coupé): 2,105 kg (4,641 lb) (dry) 2,550 kg (5,622 lb) (max weight)

Chronology
- Predecessor: Alpina B6 (E63)

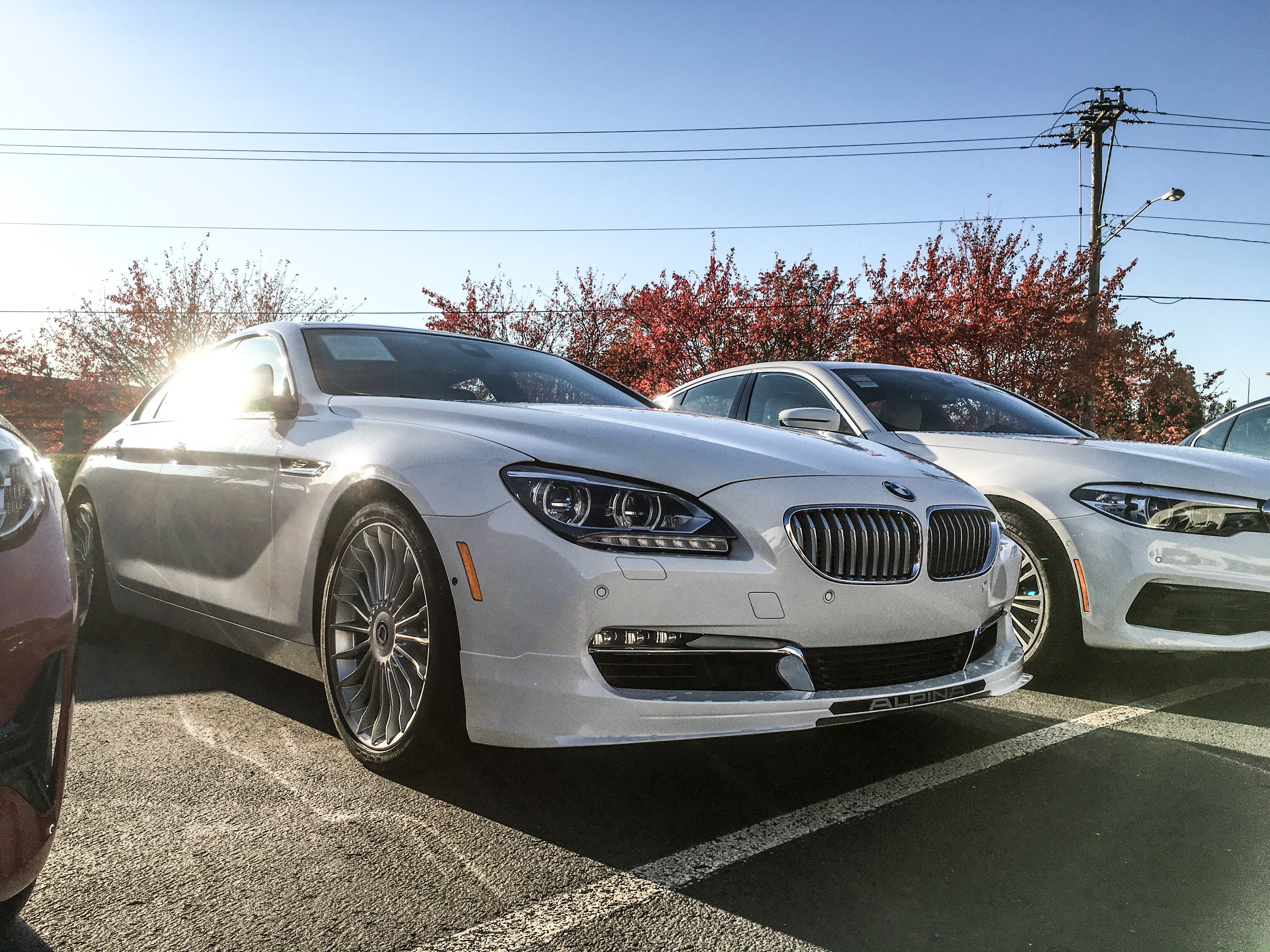
Alpina B6 Gran Coupe

The Alpina B6 (F12) is the third generation of the high performance grand tourer manufactured by German automobile manufacturer Alpina. Introduced at the 2011 Tokyo Motor Show, the B6 was based on the BMW 6 Series and was available in coupé and convertible body styles, with the latter being introduced at the 2011 Frankfurt Motor Show. A third saloon bodystyle called the gran coupé was introduced in 2014. The Alpina B6 gran coupé was replaced by the Alpina B8 gran coupe (G16) in 2021.

== Development and introduction ==
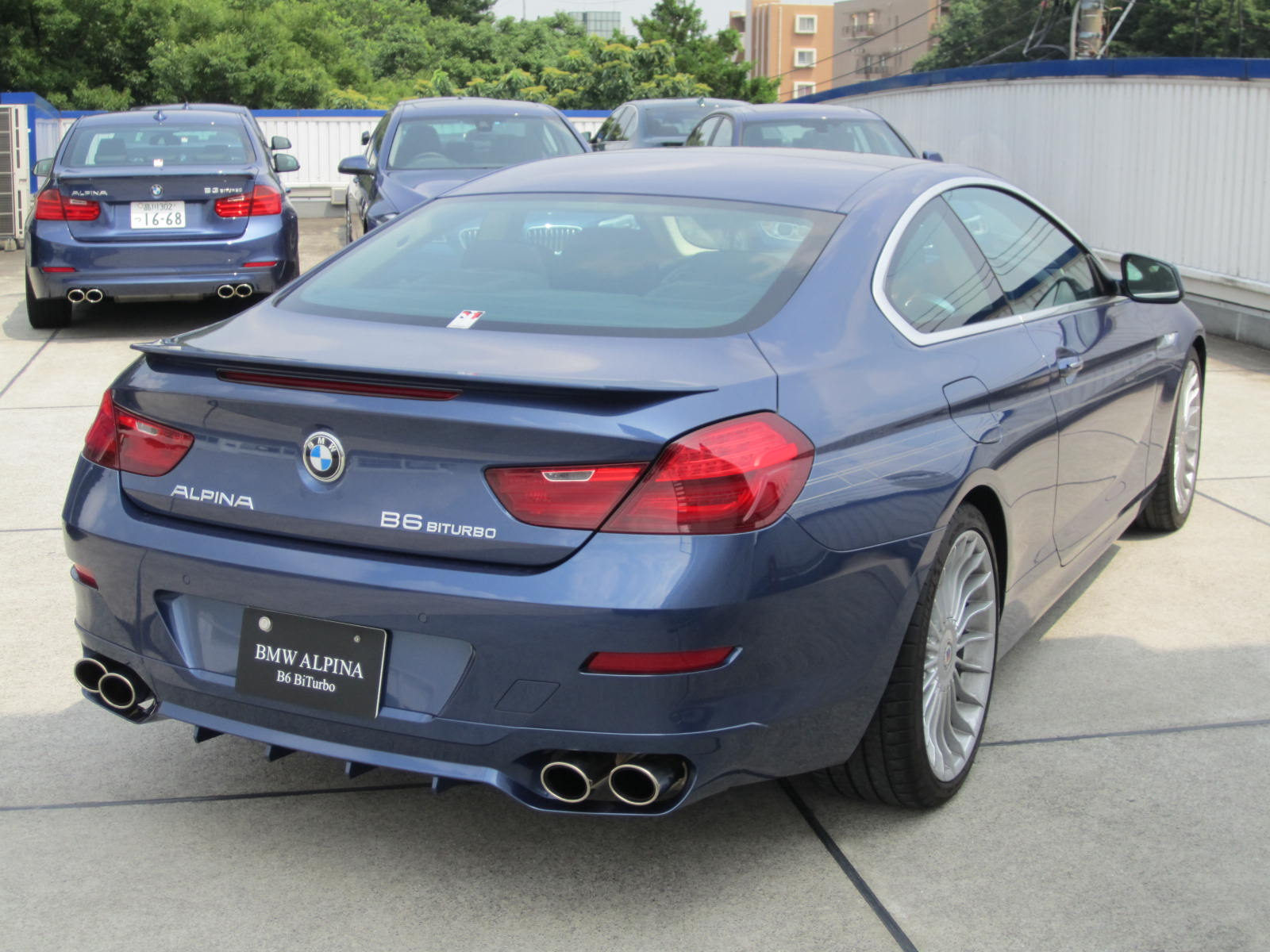
Alpina B6 (F13)

The B6 is based on the 650i and uses a modified version of its N63 twin-turbocharged V8 engine designated the M2/1. The engine was modified by the addition of new turbochargers with modified exhaust turbines, a BOSCH MEVD 17.2.H ECU, new MAHLE pistons and a larger intercooler. These modifications allowed the engine to generate 540 PS (397 kW; 533 hp) and 700 N⋅m (516 lb⋅ft) of torque (the B6 convertible's engine generated a total of 507 PS (373 kW; 500 hp)). The engine is mated to an 8-speed ZF automatic transmission with optional limited slip differential and a manual shifting mode called the Sport Shift mode which allows the driver to change gears via buttons located on the back of the steering wheel.

The exhaust system is a titanium unit from Akrapovic with quad-exhaust tips and electronically controlled bypass valves. The B6 has an aerodynamic kit that includes a carbon-fibre front spoiler with an integrated front splitter along with an integrated NACA brake cooling duct and a rear lip spoiler and a rear diffuser.

The car comes with 20-inch Alpina classic multi-spoke alloy wheels wrapped in Michelin Pilot Sport tyres measuring 8.5 x 20 255/35 ZR20 at the front and 10 x 20 295/30 ZR20 at the rear.

The suspension system consists of electronically adjustable dampers (called Drive Performance) and active roll stabilisation (called Dynamic Drive) with Alpina specific software to control the system. The car has four driving modes, "sports", "sports +", "comfort" and "eco".

The car has Lavalina leather interior upholstery and myrtle wood trim as standard. The interior has Alpina logos and emblems throughout along with illuminated door sills, a panoramic roof, Alpina gauges, adjustable vented sports seats, heated rear seats, BMW driver assistance plus including active blind spot detection and a sports steering wheel. Alpina's customisation programme for the interior was exclusive to Europe only.

The B6 coupé and convertible came with rear-wheel-drive drive train while the later introduced gran coupe had all-wheel-drive drive train.

== Performance ==
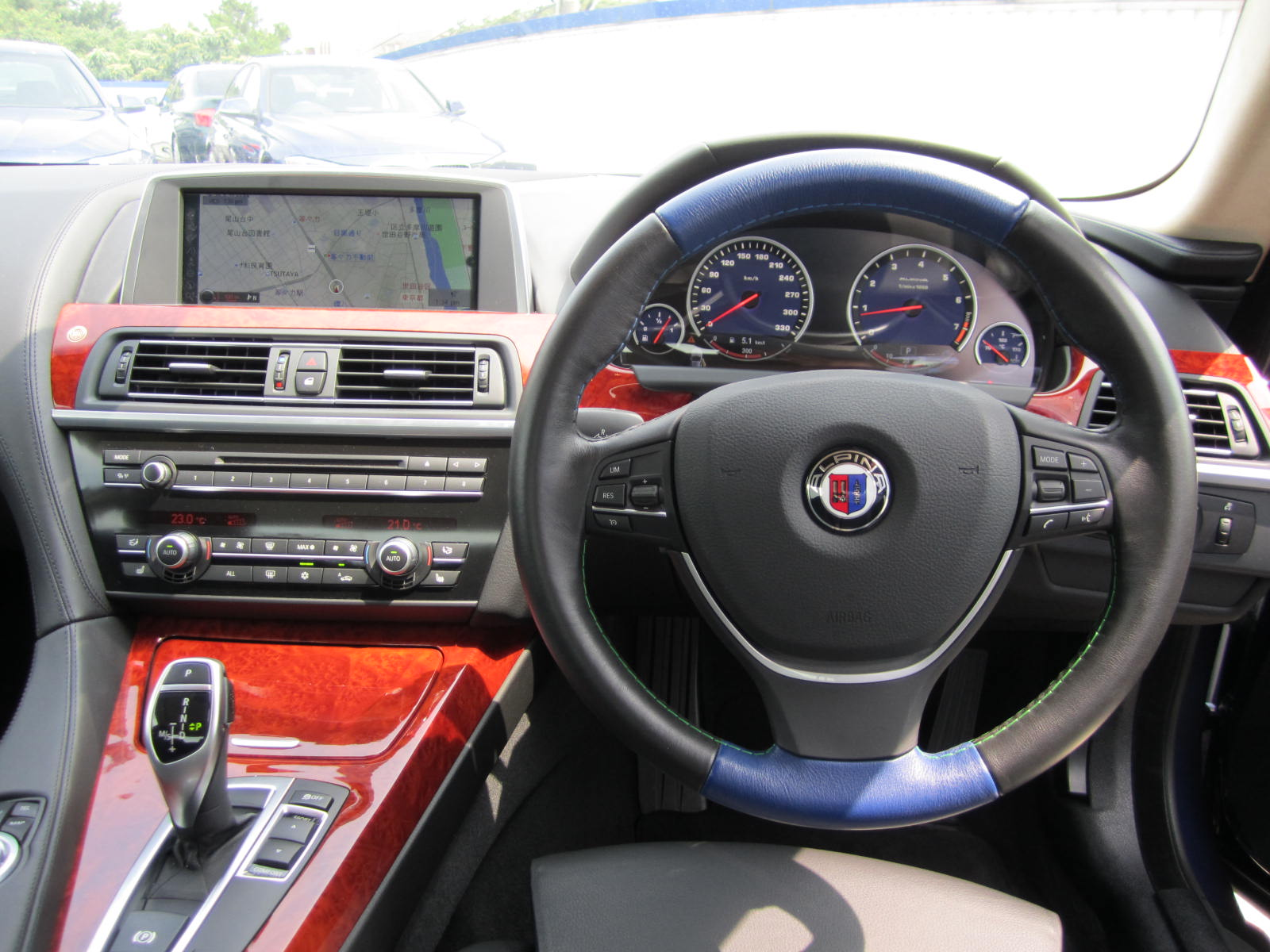
Interior

The B6 coupé and convertible can accelerate from 0–97 km/h (0–60 mph) in a quoted time of 4.4 seconds and can attain a top speed of 320 km/h (199 mph). Although independent testing revealed that the top speed was higher than quoted figures and was recorded at 328 km/h (204 mph) thus making it faster than its BMW M counterpart, the M6.

The gran coupé, when independently tested, had a 0–97 km/h (0–60 mph) acceleration time of 3.7 seconds, 0–161 km/h (0–100 mph) acceleration time of 8.2 seconds, a quarter-mile time of 12.0 seconds and a top speed of 319 km/h (198 mph) The Alpina B6 Gran Coupé has slightly less performance but a more luxurious ride than the BMW M6 Gran Coupé.

== B6 Edition 50 ==
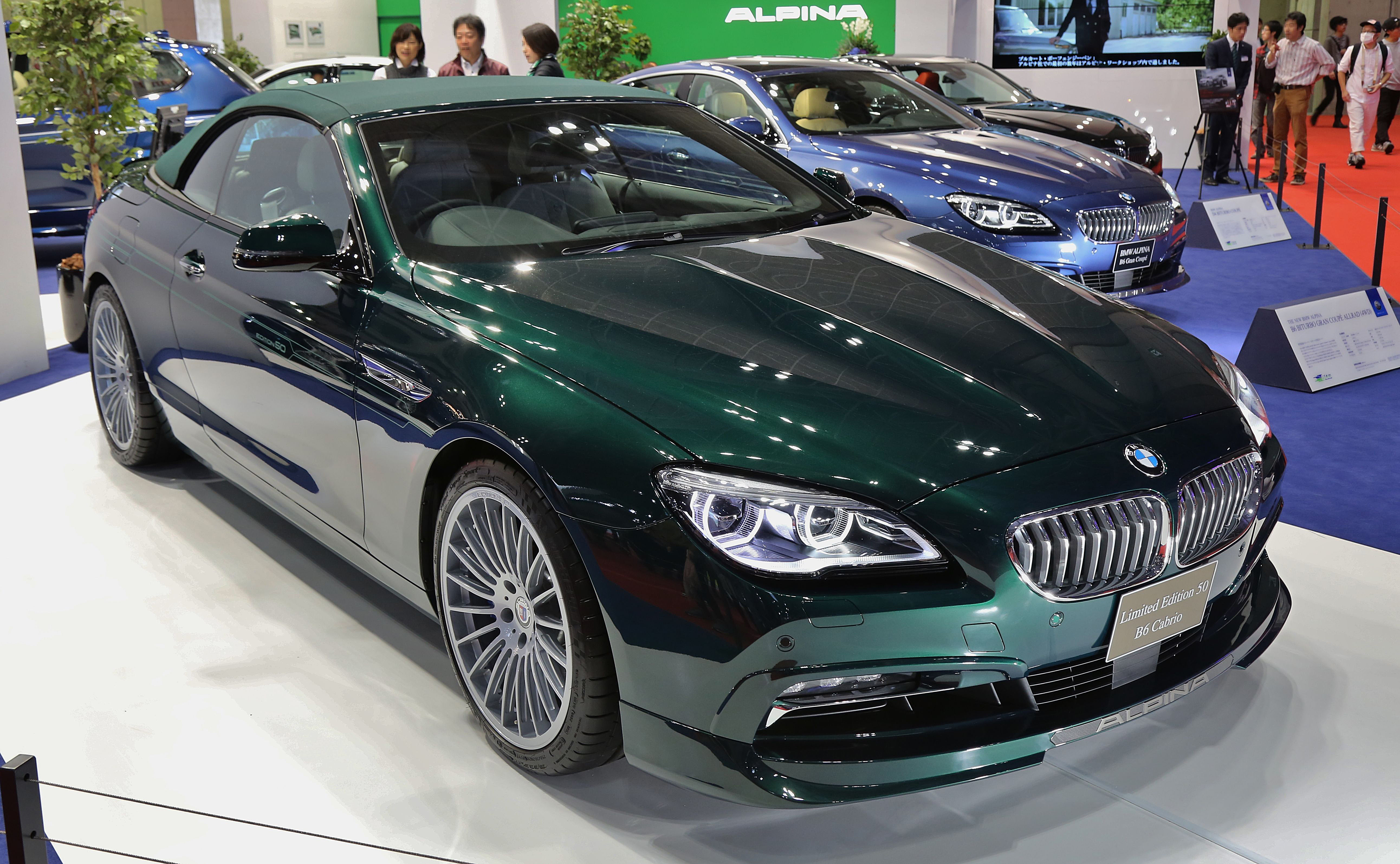
Alpina B6 Edition 50 convertible

Unveiled at the 2015 Geneva Motor Show, the Edition 50 is a limited production variant of the B6 available in coupé and convertible bodystyle only. The Edition 50 has a modified version of the 4.4-litre twin-turbocharged V8 engine found in the standard B6 generating a maximum power output of 608 PS (447 kW; 600 hp) at 6,000 rpm and 800 N⋅m (590 lb⋅ft) of torque at 3,500 rpm. This was the most powerful engine ever built by Alpina at the time.

The driveline uses the 8-speed ZF automatic transmission, and the rear axle had a limited slip differential included as standard. The Edition 50 had a 17 kg (37 lb) lighter Akrapovic titanium exhaust system and 20-inch forged multi-spoke alloy wheels exclusive to the model which reduced the weight by a further 15.6 kg (34.4 lb).

The Edition 50 was only available with classic Alpina blue or classic Alpina Green body colours with optional Alpina pinstripes. The interior had a Forest Green and black Nappa leather upholstery with contrast yellow stitching and ceramic finishing on the centre console paying homage to the 1982 B7 S Turbo. The stainless steel Edition 50 door sills had founder Burkard Bovensiepen's signature. The car had a plaque signifying the production number of the 50 units produced.

The B6 Edition 50 can accelerate from 0–97 km/h (0–60 mph) in 4.2 seconds. The coupé can attain a top speed of 328 km/h (204 mph) while the convertible can attain a top speed of 327 km/h (203 mph)

== Gallery ==
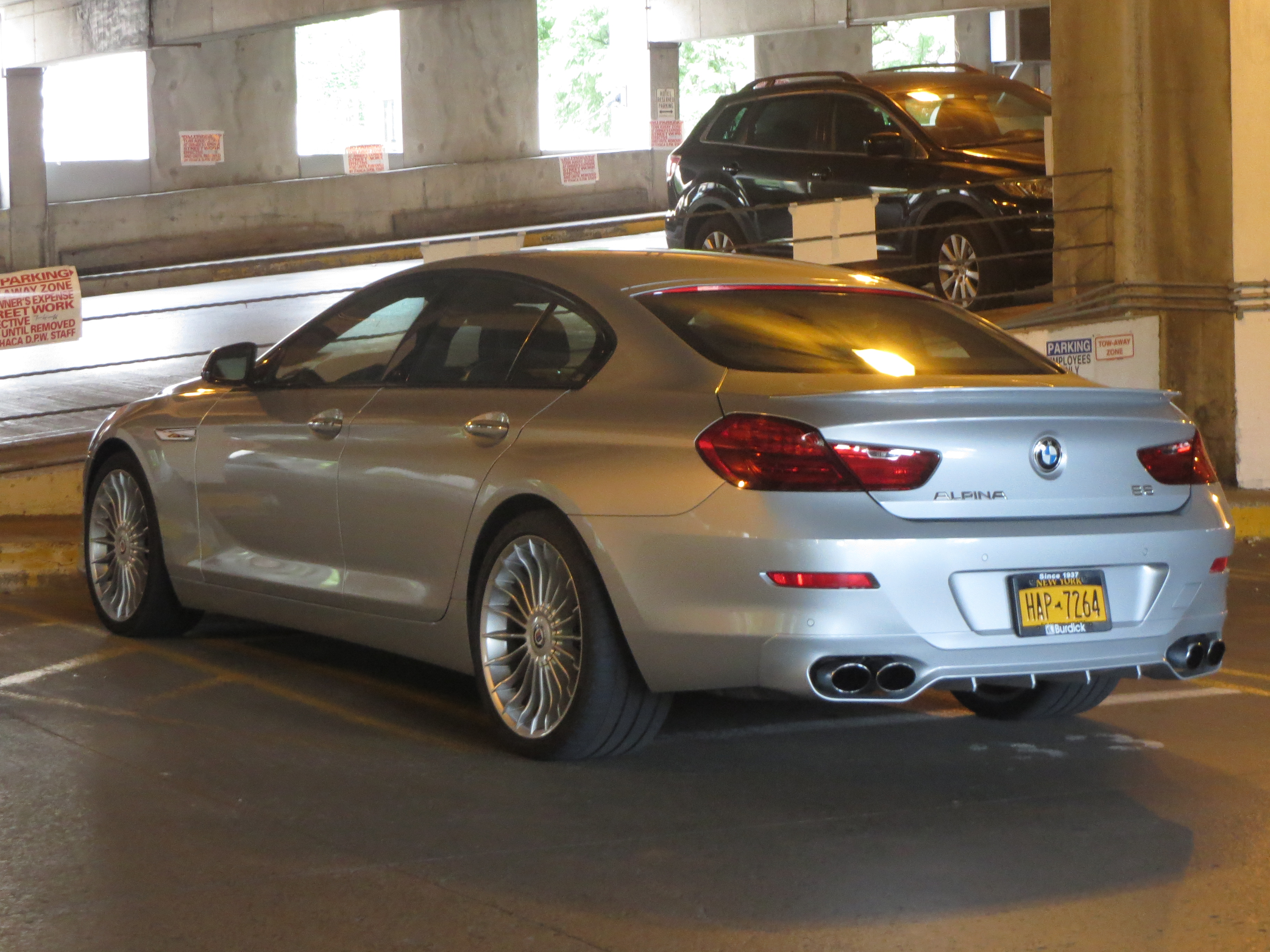
Alpina B6 (F06)

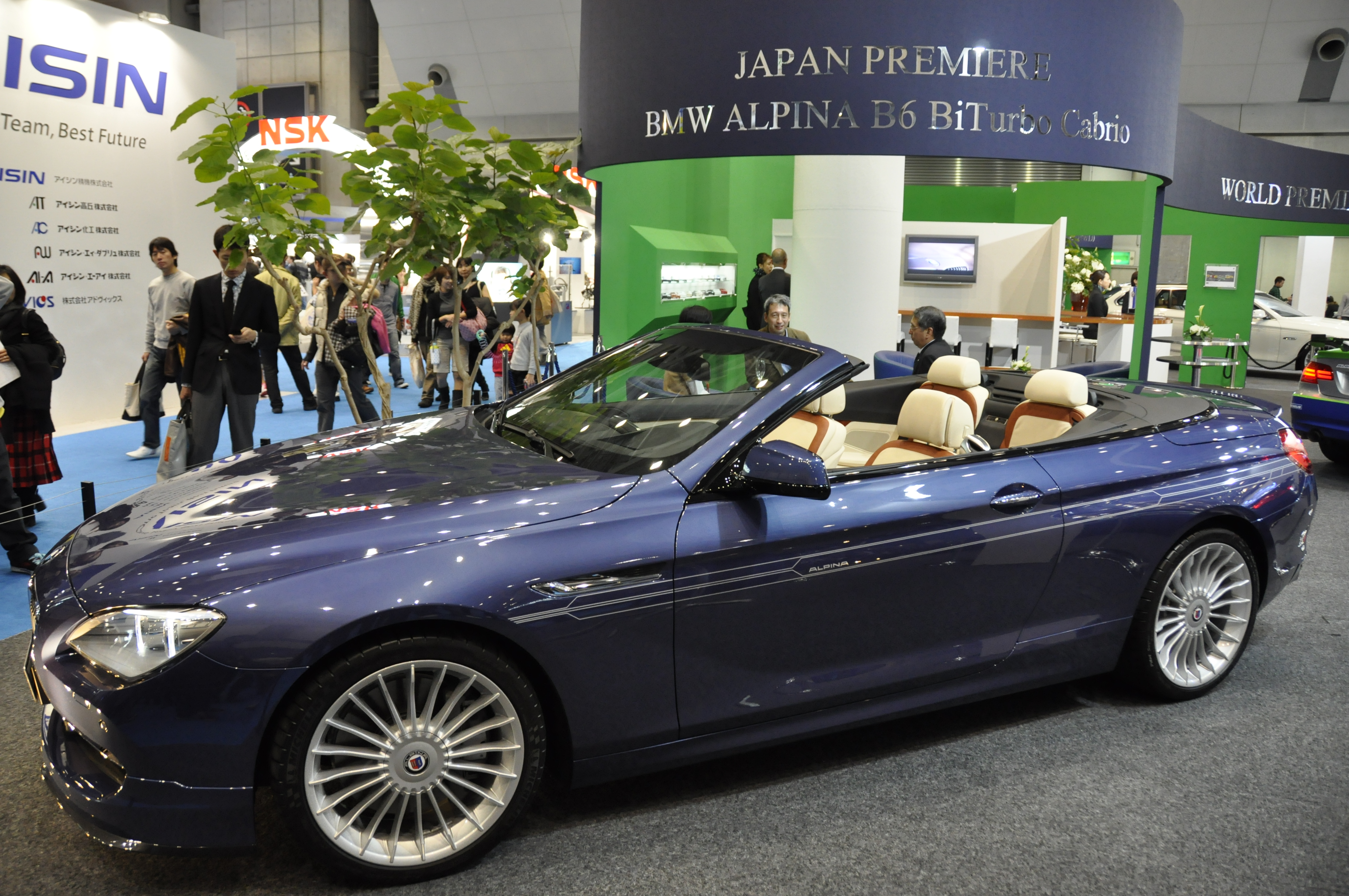
Alpina B6 (F12)
