= BMW N63 =

BMW N63 engine
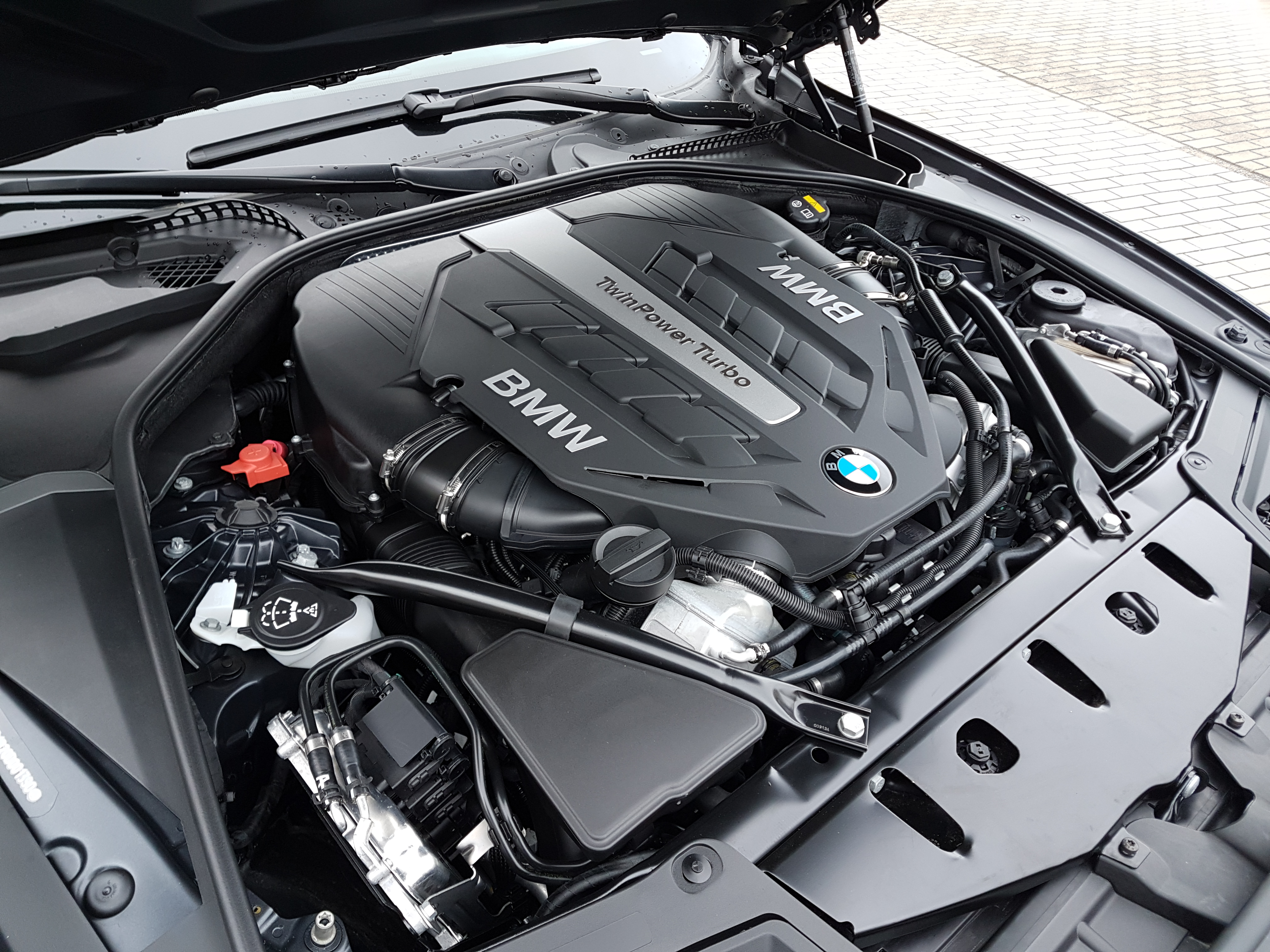

Overview
- Production: 2008–2026

Layout
- Configuration: 90° V8
- Displacement: 4.0 L (3,982 cc); 4.4 L (4,395 cc)
- Cylinder bore: 89 mm (3.50 in)
- Piston stroke: 80 mm (3.15 in); 88.3 mm (3.48 in)
- Cylinder block material: Aluminium
- Cylinder head material: Aluminium
- Valvetrain: DOHC w/ VVT

Combustion
- Turbocharger: Twin-turbo
- Fuel type: Petrol

Chronology
- Predecessor: BMW N62
- Successor: BMW S68

The BMW N63 is a twin-turbocharged petrol V8 engine which has been in production from 2008 to present. The N63 is the world's first production car engine to use a "hot-vee" layout, with the turbochargers located inside the "V" of the engine. It is also BMW's first turbocharged petrol V8 engine. The engine has been widely noted for its mechanical issues, undergoing several recalls.

The N63 replaced the BMW N62 (a naturally aspirated V8 engine) and was first used in the 2008 X6 xDrive50i.

The S63 engine is the BMW M high-performance version of the N63.

Alpina versions of the N63 are used in various F01 7 Series, F10 5 Series, G11 7 Series, G15 8 Series and G30 5 Series models.

== Design ==
The airflow path through the engine uses a "hot-vee" layout, where the exhaust manifolds and turbochargers are located between the cylinder banks (on the "inside" of the V8) and the intake manifolds are located on the outside of the engine. This is opposite to the traditional layout for a V8, where the intake is inside the "V" and the exhaust manifold is on the outside. The hot-vee layout reduces the width of the engine and decreases the exhaust runner length from the exhaust valves to the turbochargers. The engine uses air-to-water intercoolers, therefore improving throttle response.

Similar to the N54B30, the initial N63 (including the S63) did not use Valvetronic (variable valve lift) because its benefit of reducing of intake vacuum is not as important in turbocharged engines. Due to the presence of turbocharging, the N63 does not use a variable-length intake manifold.

The N63 is BMW's first V8 engine to use direct injection.

The N63/S63 uses a bore of 89 mm (3.50 in) and a stroke of 88.3 mm (3.48 in) [except for the Chinese market 89 mm (3.50 in) and a stroke of 80 mm (3.15 in)].

=== 2012 technical update ===
In 2012, a "Technical Update" was applied to the N63, resulting in the N63TÜ variants (also known as N63B44O1). The main upgrade was the addition of Valvetronic. Other changes include revised turbochargers, removal of the blowoff valve, lighter pistons, forged connecting rods and crankshaft, addition of a valve cover labyrinth oil catch/return system, new valve stem seals, revised fuel system and addition of a second coolant pump.

=== 2016 technical update ===
A second Technical Update occurred in 2016, resulting in the N63TÜ2 variants (also known as N63B44O2). The major changes are the use of twin-scroll turbochargers, a wider powerband and the oil/coolant heat exchanger being moved to within the "V" of the engine.

=== 2018 technical update ===
A third Technical Update was introduced in 2018. Two variants are offered: N63B44M3 and N63B44T3. N63B44M3 features improved thermal shielding for the crankcase and the cylinder head, and a new ignition system. The N63B44T3 gains higher pressure (5000psi) injectors, larger twin-scroll turbochargers, a redesigned intake manifold, and an upstream cooling radiator.

== Models ==
Engine	Displacement	Power	Torque	Years
N63B40A	3,982 cc	300 kW (402 hp; 408 PS) at 5,500 rpm	600 N⋅m (443 lb⋅ft) at 1,750-4,500 rpm	2012–2015
N63B40A	3,982 cc	331 kW (444 hp; 450 PS) at 5,500 rpm	650 N⋅m (479 lb⋅ft) at 1,750-4,500 rpm	2012–2015
N63B44O0	4,395 cc	300 kW (402 hp; 408 PS) at 5,500-6,400 rpm	600 N⋅m (443 lb⋅ft) at 1,750-4,500 rpm	2008–2013
N63B44O1	4,395 cc	331 kW (444 hp; 450 PS) at 5,500-6,000 rpm	650 N⋅m (479 lb⋅ft) at 2,000-4,500 rpm	2013–2016
N63B44O2	4,395 cc	331 kW (444 hp; 450 PS) at 5,500-6,000 rpm	650 N⋅m (479 lb⋅ft) at 1,800-4,500 rpm	2016–2020
N63B44M3	4,395 cc	340 kW (456 hp; 462 PS) at 5,250-6,000 rpm	650 N⋅m (479 lb⋅ft) at 1,500-4,750 rpm	2018–present
N63B44T3	4,395 cc	390 kW (523 hp; 530 PS) at 5,500-6,000 rpm	750 N⋅m (553 lb⋅ft) at 1,800-4,600 rpm	2018–present
S63B44O0	4,395 cc	408 kW (547 hp; 555 PS) at 6,000 rpm	680 N⋅m (502 lb⋅ft) at 1,500-5,650 rpm	2010–2013
S63B44T0	4,395 cc	412 kW (553 hp; 560 PS) at 6,000-7,000 rpm	680 N⋅m (502 lb⋅ft) at 1,500-5,750 rpm	2011–2018
S63B44T2	4,395 cc	423 kW (567 hp; 575 PS) at 6,000-6,500 rpm	750 N⋅m (553 lb⋅ft) at 2,200-5,000 rpm	2015–2018
S63B44T4	4,395 cc	441 kW (591 hp; 600 PS) at 5,600-6,700 rpm	750 N⋅m (553 lb⋅ft) at 1,800-5,600 rpm	2018–present
S63B44T4	4,395 cc	460 kW (617 hp; 625 PS) at 5,600-6,700 rpm	750 N⋅m (553 lb⋅ft) at 1,800-5,800 rpm	2019–present

=== N63B40A ===
This smaller variant was sold in the Chinese market. Due to a shorter stroke length of 80 mm (3.15 in), the capacity is reduced to 3,982 cc (243.0 cu in).

Applications:

- 2013–2016 F12/F13 650i (China only, 300 kW (402 hp; 408 PS) version)
- 2013–2017 F01/F02 750i/750Li (China only, 331 kW (444 hp; 450 PS) version)
- 2014–2017 F15 X5 xDrive50i
- 2015–2017 F16 X6 xDrive50i

=== N63B44O0 ===
The initial version of the N63 produces 300 kW (402 hp; 408 PS) and 600 N⋅m (443 lb⋅ft).

Applications:

- 2008–2014 E71 X6 xDrive50i
- 2008–2012 F01/F02 750i/750Li
- 2009–2012 F07 550i GT
- 2010–2013 F10/F11 550i
- 2011–2013 E70 X5 xDrive50i
- 2011–2013 F12/F13 650i
- 2011–2014 Wiesmann GT MF4

=== N63B44O1 (N63TÜ) ===
The first technical update resulted in an increase of 31 kW (42 hp; 42 PS) and 50 N⋅m (37 lb⋅ft).

Applications:

- 2013–2015 F01/F02 750i/750Li
- 2013–2017 F07 550i GT
- 2014–2016 F10/F11 550i
- 2014–2018 F15 X5 xDrive50i
- 2014–2019 F16 X6 xDrive50i
- 2013–2018 F12/F13 650i
- 2013–2019 F06 650i

=== N63B44O2 (N63TÜ2) ===
The second technical update resulted in peak torque being produced over a 200 rpm wider band.

Applications:

- 2016–2019 G11/G12 750i/750Li
- 2017–2020 G30/G31 M550i xDrive

=== N63B44M3 (N63TÜ3) ===
Applications:

- 2019–2020; G05 X5 xDrive50i
- 2019–2020; G07 X7 xDrive50i

=== N63B44T3 (N63TÜ3) ===
Applications:

- 2018–2026 G14/G15/G16 M850i xDrive
- 2019–2022 G11/G12 750i/750Li sDrive/xDrive
- 2020–2023 G30/G31 M550i xDrive
- 2020–2023 G05 X5 M50i
- 2020–2023 G06 X6 M50i
- 2020–2022 G07 X7 M50i
- 2019–2022 G12 Alpina B7
- 2021–2022 G07 Alpina XB7
- 2021–2026 G16 Alpina B8 Gran Coupe
- 2022–2023 Range Rover P530 (L460)
- 2022–2023 Range Rover Sport P530 (L461)

== S63 ==
BMW S63 engine
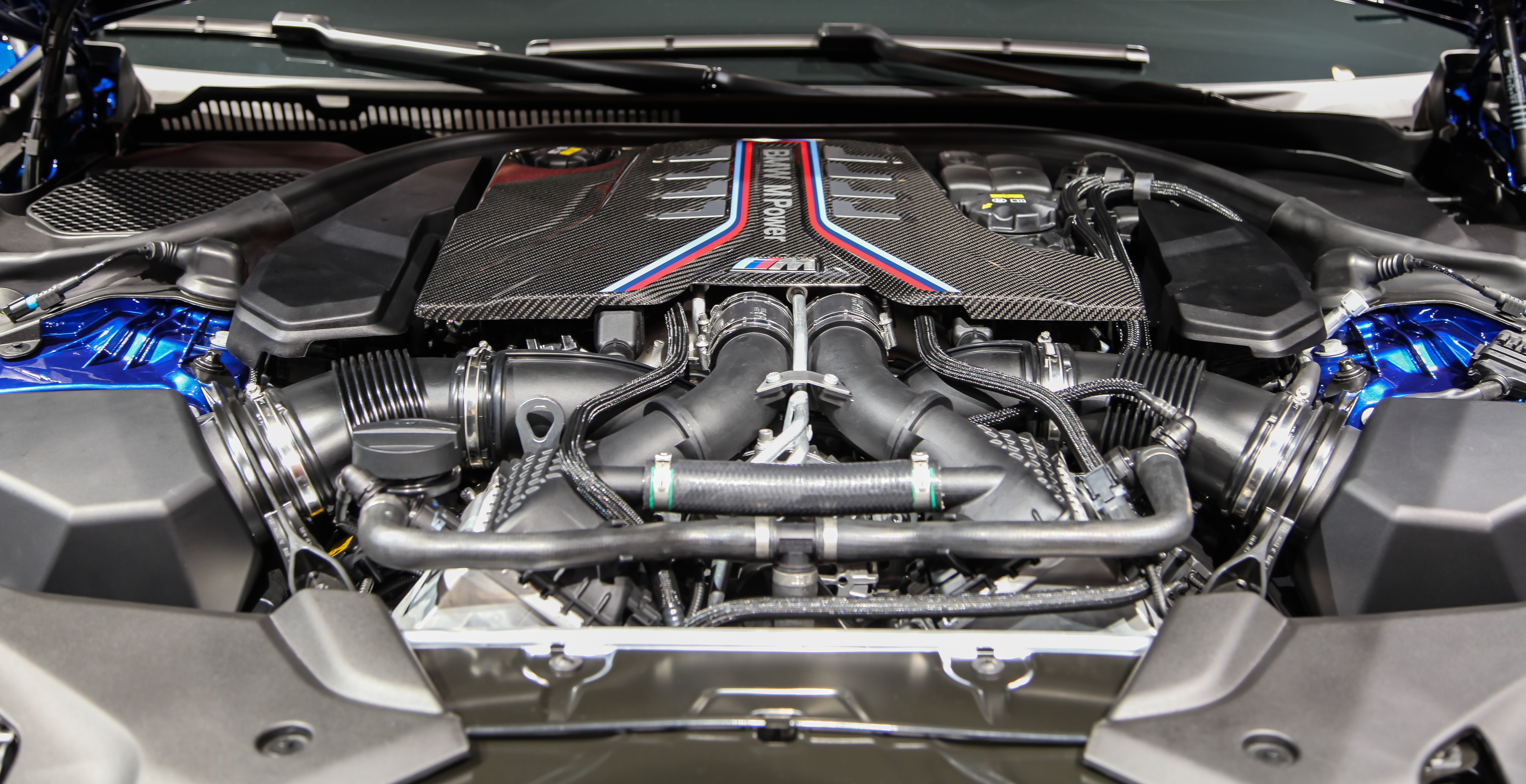

Overview
- Production: 2009-present

Layout
- Configuration: 90° V8
- Displacement: 4.4 L (4,395 cc)
- Cylinder bore: 89 mm (3.50 in)
- Piston stroke: 88.3 mm (3.48 in)
- Valvetrain: DOHC, with VVT & VVL

Combustion
- Turbocharger: Twin-turbo
- Fuel type: Petrol

Chronology
- Predecessor: BMW S62
- Successor: BMW S68

The S63 is the BMW M version of the N63, which debuted in the BMW X6 M and was used in the BMW M5 models from 2011 to 2023. The S63 uses two twin-scroll turbochargers plus a pulse tuned, cross-engine exhaust manifold to keep constant exhaust pulses flowing to the turbos at every 180 degree rotation.

=== S63B44O0 ===
Applications:

- 2010–2013 E70 X5 M
- 2010–2013 E71 X6 M
- 2011–2014 Wiesman GT MF5

=== S63B44T0 ===
A technical update to the S63, known as the S63B44T0, debuted on the F10 M5 sedan. This version uses Valvetronic, a 10:1 compression ratio (compared with 9.3:1 for the non-TU version) and 1.5 bar of boost (compared with 1.3). It is the first BMW M engine to use Valvetronic. The rev limit was increased from 6800 rpm to 7200 rpm.

Applications:

- 2011–2017 F10 M5
- 2012–2018 F12/F13/F06 M6

=== S63B44T2 ===
The S63B44T2 debuted on the 2015 X5 M and X6 M models.

Applications:

- 2015–2019 F85 X5 M
- 2015–2019 F86 X6 M

=== S63B44T4 ===
The S63B44T4 debuted on the 2018 M5.

Applications:

- 2018–2023 F90 M5
- 2018–2023 F90 M5 Competition
- 2021 F90 M5 CS
- 2019–2026 F91/92/93 M8
- 2019–2026 F91/92/93 M8 Competition
- 2020–2023 F95 X5 M
- 2020–2023 F95 X5 M Competition
- 2020–2023 F96 X6 M
- 2020–2023 F96 X6 M Competition

== P63 ==
BMW P63 engine

Overview
- Production: 2018-present

Layout
- Configuration: 90° V8
- Displacement: 4.0 L (3,982 cc)
- Cylinder bore: 89 mm (3.50 in)
- Piston stroke: 80 mm (3.15 in)
- Valvetrain: DOHC w/ VVT

Combustion
- Turbocharger: Twin-turbo
- Fuel type: Petrol

Chronology
- Predecessor: None

The P63 is the BMW Motorsport version of the N63, which debuted in the BMW M8 GTE.

== Alpina ==
Alpina uses a variant of the N63 engine, which was hand-assembled at the Alpina plant in Buchloe before being transported to the BMW production line.

For the 2013 model year, the Alpina engine received Valvetronic like all other N63 engines.

Engine	Power	Torque	Compression ratio	Years
M1	373 kW (500 bhp) at 5,500 rpm	700 N⋅m (516 lb⋅ft) at 3,000-4,750 rpm	9.2:1	2009–2012
M1/1	397 kW (532 bhp) at 5,200-6,250 rpm	730 N⋅m (538 lb⋅ft) at 2,800-5,000 rpm	9.2:1	2012–2014
M2, M2/1	397 kW (532 bhp) at 5,200-6,250 rpm	730 N⋅m (538 lb⋅ft) at 2,800-5,000 rpm	10.0:1	2012–2015
M2/2	441 kW (591 bhp) at 6,000 rpm	800 N⋅m (590 lb⋅ft) at 3,500-4,500 rpm	10.0:1	2015-
M5 (N63M30)	447 kW (600 bhp) at 5,750-6,250 rpm	800 N⋅m (590 lb⋅ft) at 3,000-5,000 rpm	10.0:1	2016-
M5/1 (N63B44T3 type)	456 kW (612 bhp) at 5,500-6,500 rpm	800 N⋅m (590 lb⋅ft) at 2,000-5,000 rpm	10.5:1	2020-

=== M1 ===
Applications:

- 2009–2012 Alpina B7 Bi-Turbo: based on the BMW F01 7 Series
- 2010–2011 Alpina B5 Bi-Turbo Sedan/Touring: based on the BMW F10/F11 5 Series.

=== M1/1 ===
Applications:

- 2012–2014 Alpina B5 Bi-Turbo Sedan/Touring: based on the BMW F10/F11 5 Series

=== M1/2 ===
Applications:

- 2011–2015 Alpina B6 Bi-Turbo Coupé/Cabrio: based on the BMW F12/F13 6 Series

=== M2, M2/1 ===
Applications:

- 2014–2015 Alpina B6 Bi-Turbo Gran Coupé: based on the BMW F06 6 Series
- 2012–2015 Alpina B7 Bi-Turbo: based on the BMW F01 7 Series

=== M2/2 ===
Applications:

- 2015 Alpina B5 Bi-Turbo Edition 50 Sedan/Touring: based on the BMW F10/F11 5 Series
- 2015–2016 Alpina B6 Bi-Turbo Edition 50 Coupé/Cabrio: based on the BMW F12/F13 6 Series
- 2016 Alpina B5 Bi-Turbo: based on the BMW F10/F11 5 Series
- 2016–2019 Alpina B6 Bi-Turbo: based on the BMW F06/F12/F13 6 Series

=== M5 ===
The Alpina engine code is N63M30A.

Applications:

- 2016–2019 Alpina B7 Bi-Turbo: based on the BMW G12 7 Series
- 2017–2024 Alpina B5 Bi-Turbo: based on the BMW G30/G31 5 Series

== North American recall ==
In December 2014, BMW North America released a voluntary recall ("Customer Care Package") relating to issues with timing chain stretch, fuel injectors, mass air flow sensors, crankcase vent lines, battery, engine vacuum pump, low pressure fuel sensor and revising the oil service interval.

In 2019 NHTSA addressed the multitude of issues with BMW N63 engines, various class action lawsuits in tow, and never officially declared a mass recall in regard to valve seal issues inherent in the N63 line.

== See also ==
- BMW
- List of BMW engines
