= Alpina B7 (F01) =

Fifth generation of the high performance full-size luxury car

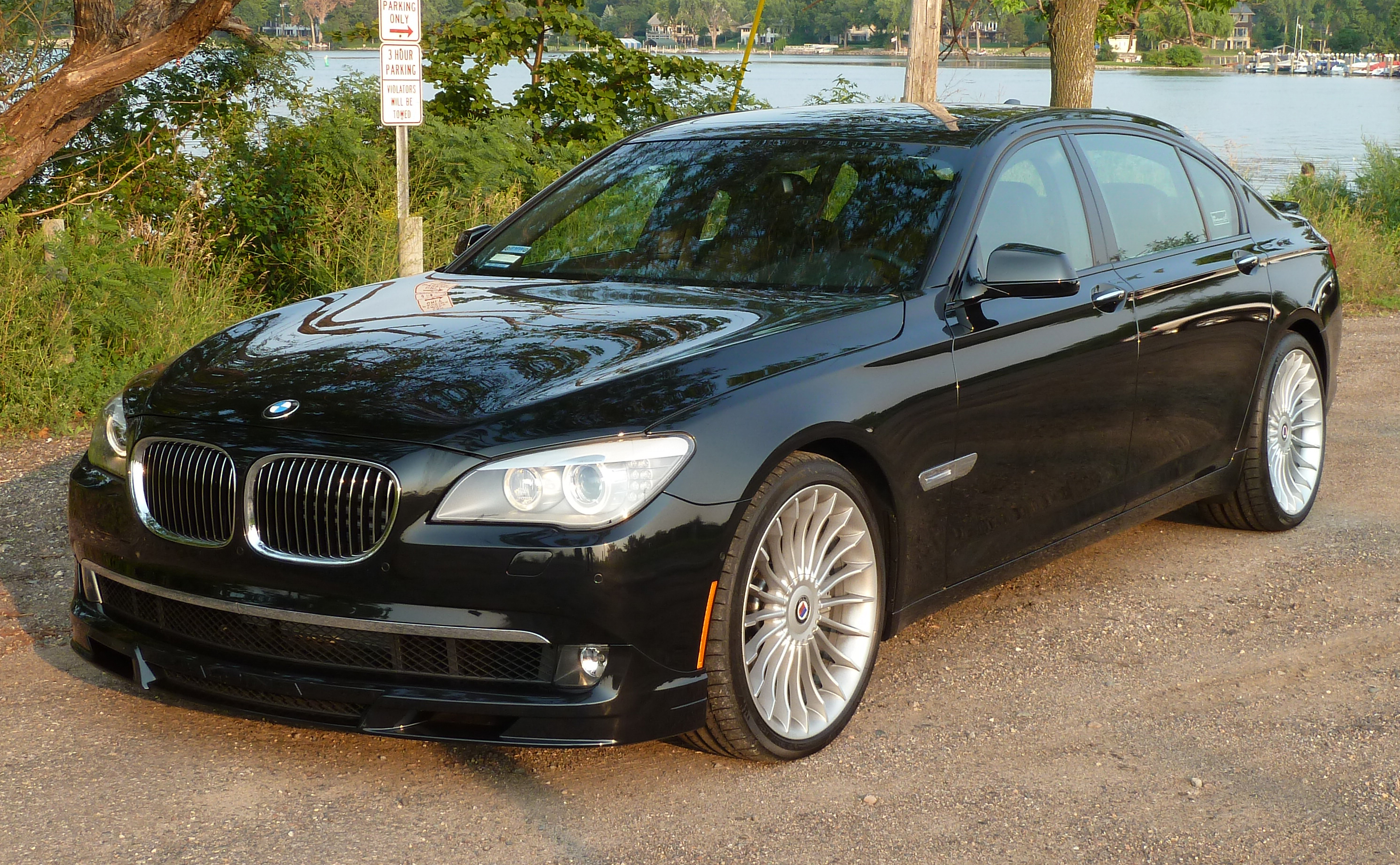
- Alpina B7 (F02) (pre-facelift)

Overview
- Manufacturer: Alpina Burkard Bovensiepen GmbH & Co. KG
- Also called: Alpina B7 Bi-Turbo
- Production: 2009–2015
- Assembly: Germany: Buchloe

Body and chassis
- Class: Full-size luxury car (F)
- Body style: 4-door saloon (F01); 4-door long-wheelbase saloon (F02)
- Layout: Front-engine, rear-wheel-drive Front-engine, all-wheel-drive (xDrive)
- Related: BMW 7 Series (F01); Alpina B6 (F12)

Powertrain
- Engine: 4.4 L BMW N63 twin-turbocharged V8
- Transmission: 6-speed ZF 6HP automatic; 8-speed ZF 8HP automatic

Dimensions
- Wheelbase: 3,070 mm (120.9 in) (F01); 3,210 mm (126.4 in) (F02)
- Length: 5,072 mm (199.7 in) (F01); 5,212 mm (205.2 in) (F02)
- Width: 1,902 mm (74.9 in)
- Height: 1,478–1,486 mm (58.2–58.5 in)
- Kerb weight: Pre-facelift models: 2,070 kg (4,564 lb) (F01); 2,205 kg (4,861 lb) (F02); Post-facelift models: 2,132 kg (4,700 lb) (F01); 2,285 kg (5,037 lb) (F02)

Chronology
- Predecessor: Alpina B7 (E65)
- Successor: Alpina B7 (G12)

The Alpina B7 (F01) is the fourth generation of the Alpina B7, a high-performance executive car manufactured by Alpina from 2011 until 2015. Based on the BMW 7 Series (F01), the car was introduced to the public at the 2010 Chicago Auto Show and was available in normal and long-wheelbase versions, with xDrive or rear-wheel drive. The B7's engine was hand-built at the Alpina factory at Buchloe and then sent to the BMW factory in Dingolfing to be put into the body shell. The car was painted and initially assembled at the Dingolfing plant and was then sent back to Alpina for final assembly. It was the second Alpina B7 to be offered in North America, with 1,740 examples imported and sold in the United States.

== Specifications ==
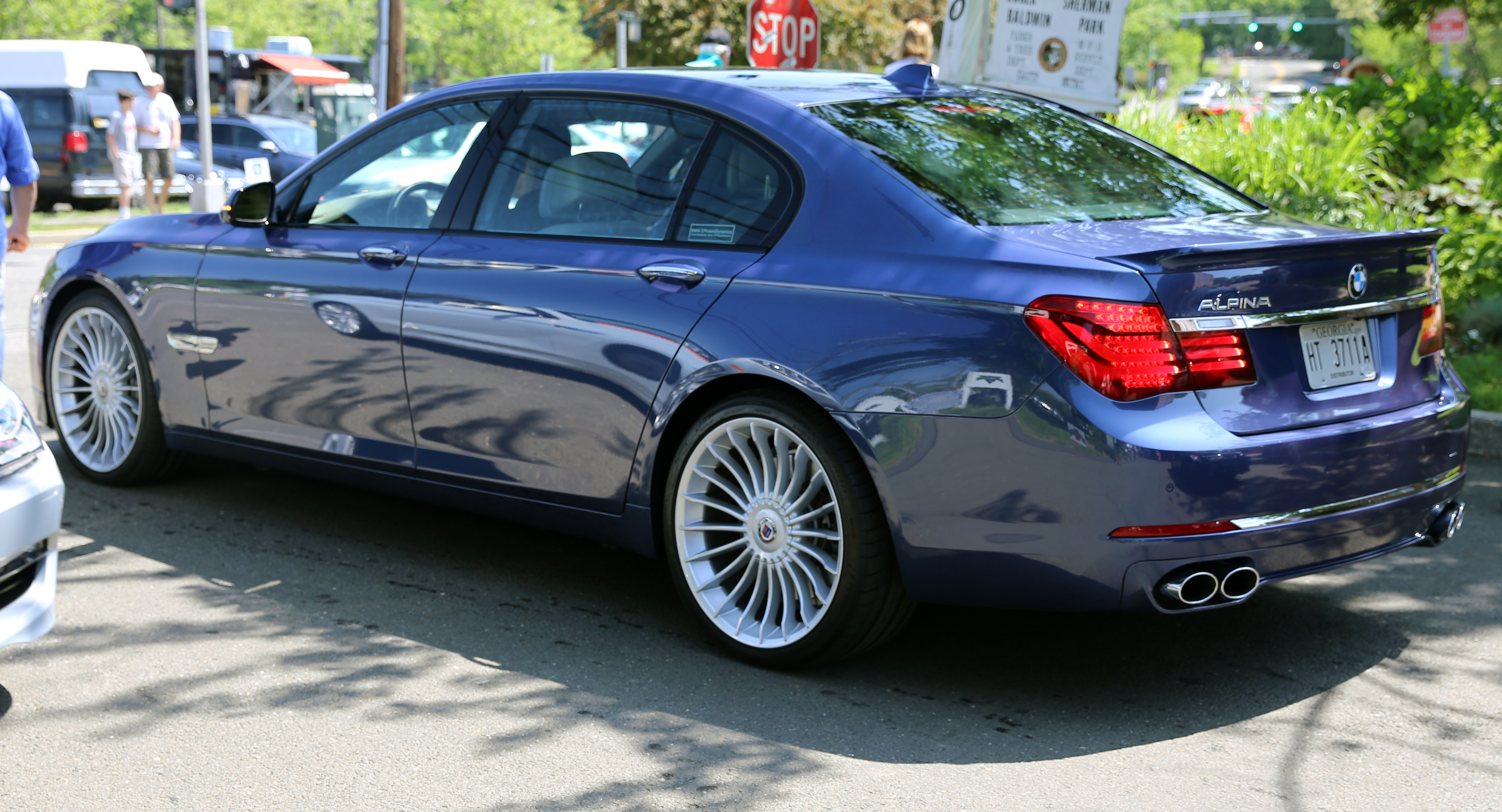
Alpina B7 (F02) (rear view; post face-lift)

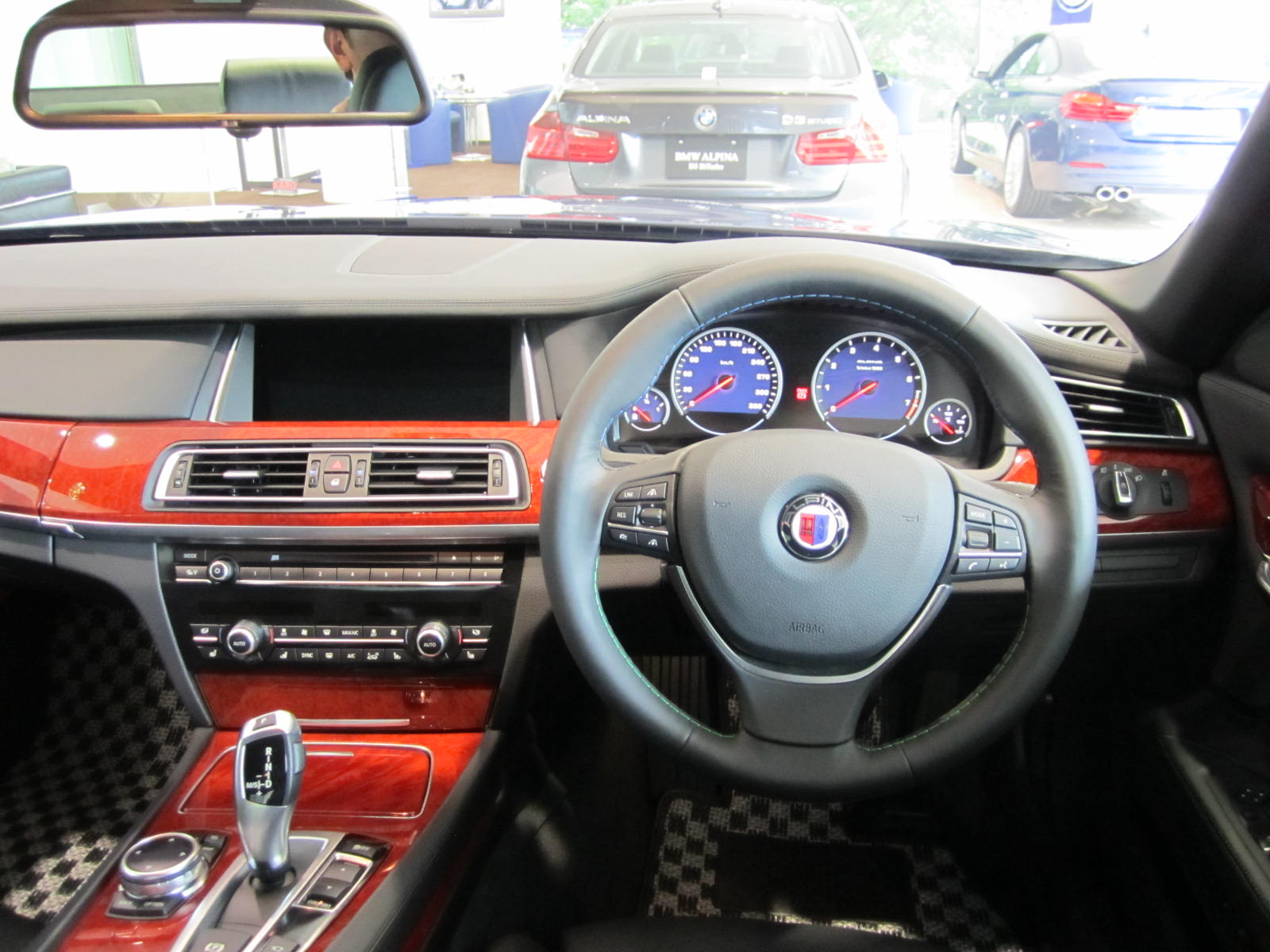
Interior

The B7 is based on the BMW 750i and the 750Li and uses a modified version of its 4.4-litre N63 twin-turbocharged V8 engine. The modifications include large 44 mm (2 in) Honeywell turbochargers, reinforced cylinder heads, NGK spark plugs, high strength MAHLE pistons and an Alpina specific ECU. The maximum boost pressure of the turbochargers is increased to 14.5 psi (1.0 bar). These modifications allow the engine to generate a power output of 507 PS (373 kW; 500 hp) at 5,500 rpm and 700 N⋅m (516 lb⋅ft) of torque. The maximum torque is generated at 3,000 rpm, 1,250 rpm less than the previous model. To cope with the extra heat from the engine, an additional radiator, external engine and transmission oil-coolers, a high performance 1,000 watt fan (shared with the 760i) and larger intercoolers with large diameter water lines were installed.

The engine was mated to a modified version of the 6-speed ZF 6HP26 TUe automatic transmission used in the 750i. Modifications to the transmission include reinforced drive-shafts and half-shafts along with a stiffer iron differential case. The transmission has a manual shifting mode which allows the driver to change gears via two buttons behind the steering wheel. The car was available in rear-wheel-drive and all-wheel-drive drivetrains.

The suspension system was modified by stiffening the spring rates by 20 percent, reducing the front and rear ride height by 15 mm (0.6 in) and 10 mm (0.4 in) respectively and by modifying the stability and traction control settings.

The brakes were shared with the high security 760Li and were the largest brakes fitted to an Alpina automobile.

The B7 was available with 21-inch Alpina multi-spoke alloy wheels wrapped in tyres measuring 245/35 at the front and 285/30 at the rear. Only the rear-wheel-drive models were available with Michelin Pilot Sport PS2 tyres. Other exterior changes include unique exhaust tips, an integrated front spoiler in the front bumper along with additional brake cooling ducts, a rear valance and a rear lip spoiler. The rear spoiler was claimed to reduce lift by 15 percent while the front spoiler was claimed to reduce lift by 30 percent.

The interior of the car had illuminated sill plaques, Lavalina leather upholstery, piano black or burle myrtle wood trim and Alpina logos and badges along with an Alpina instrument cluster. The driving modes were the same as in the 750i.

The B7 can accelerate to 97 km/h (60 mph) from a standstill in 4.5 seconds (4.6 seconds for the all-wheel-drive version) and has an electronically limited top speed of 280 km/h (174 mph).

== Face-lift ==
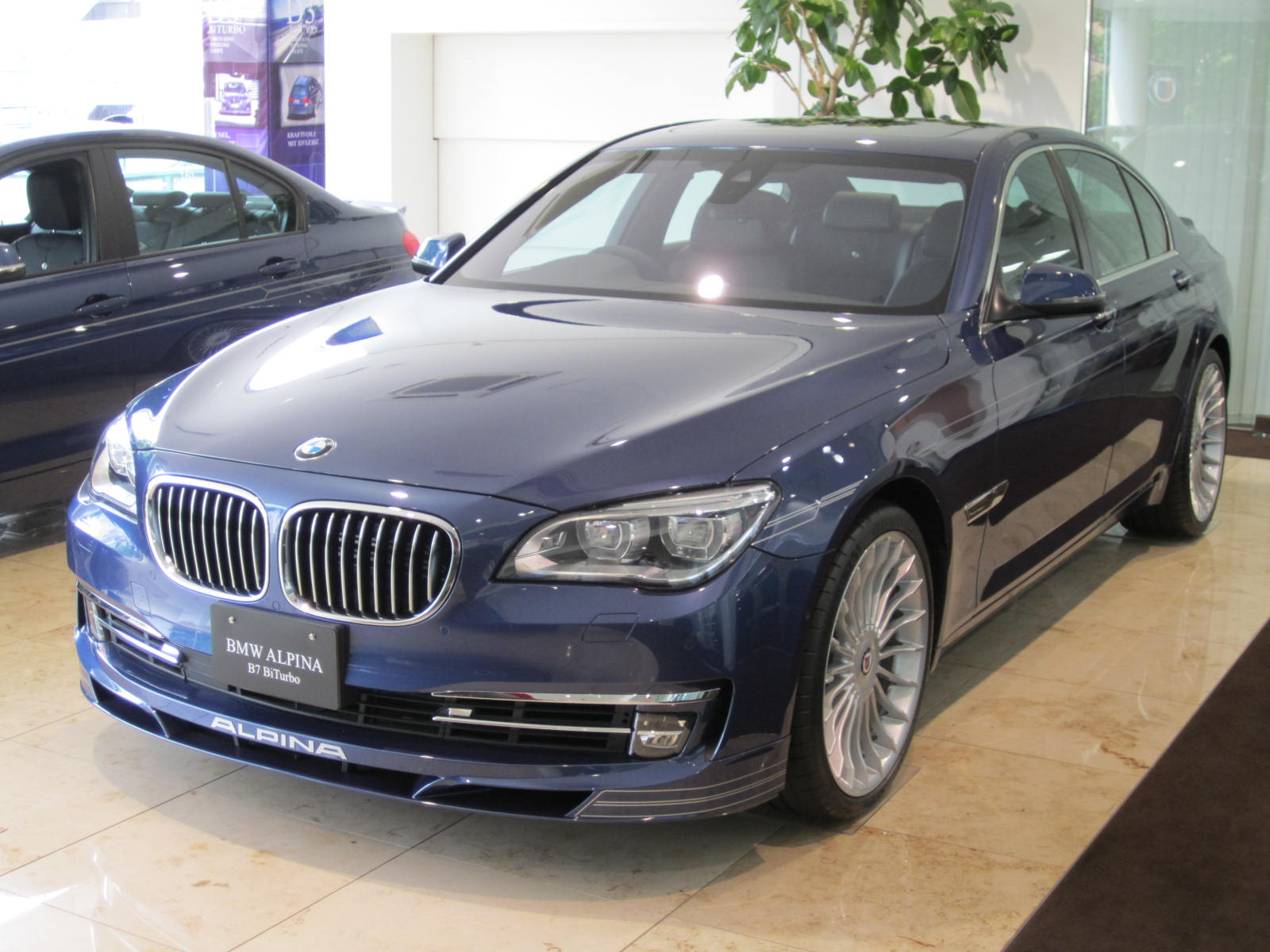
Alpina B7 (F01) (post face-lift)

From 2012 to the end of its production run, the B7 was based on the face-lift 750i. The updated model was introduced at the 2012 Pebble Beach Concours d'Elegance. Changes to the new model include a power increase to 540 PS (397 kW; 533 hp) and torque increase to 729 N⋅m (538 lb⋅ft) due to the introduction of BMW's variable valve timing technology. The 8-speed automatic transmission introduced on the facelift 7 Series also became available on the B7.

Other changes include a start/stop system, removal of the speed limiter, resulting in a top speed of 312 km/h (194 mph), and an improvement in the 0–97 km/h (0–60 mph) acceleration time, now being achieved in 4.2 seconds. Other modifications remained the same as the outgoing model.
