= Alpina B7 =

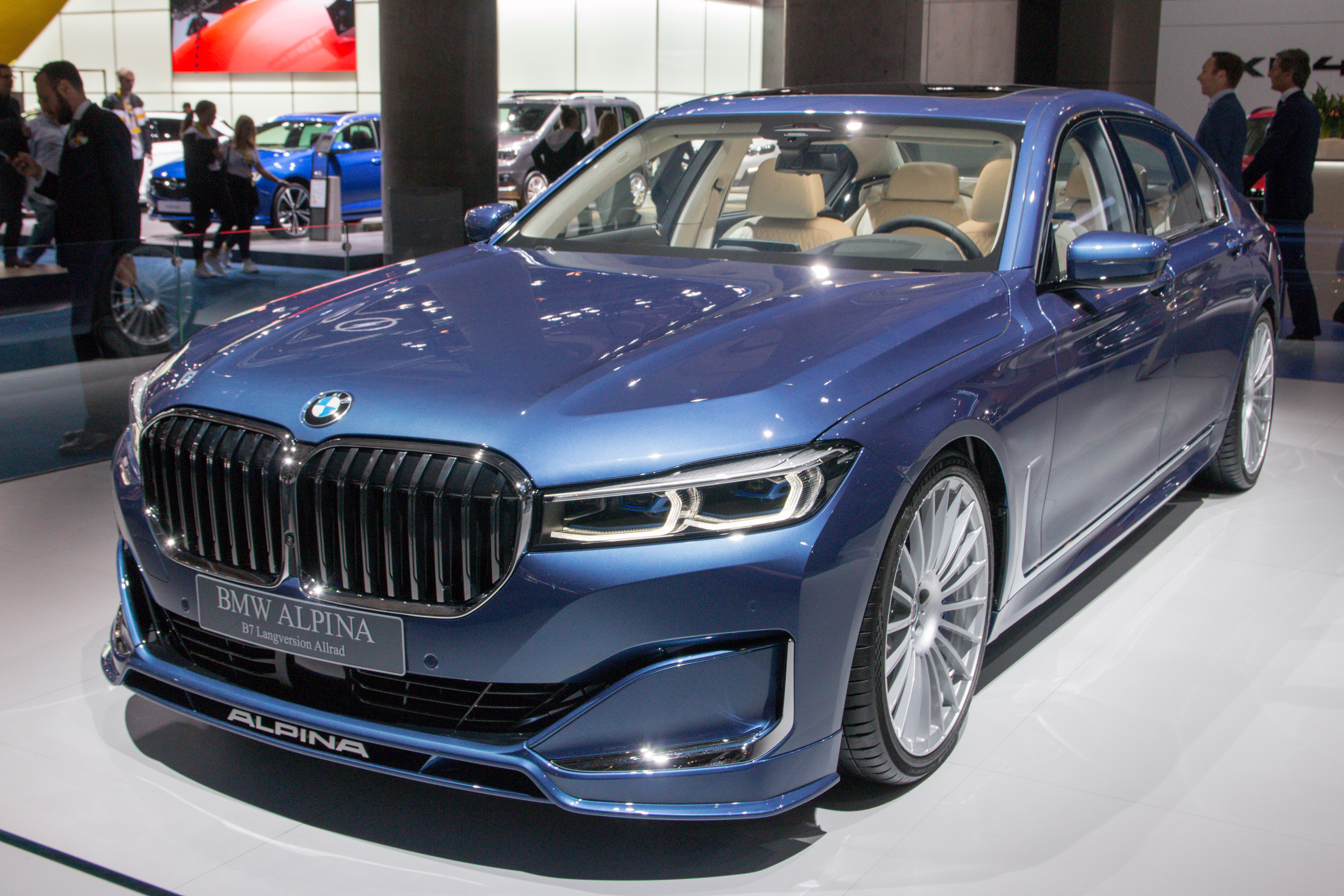
- Alpina B7 (G12)

Overview
- Manufacturer: Alpina
- Production: 2004–2022

Body and chassis
- Class: Full-size luxury car (F)
- Body style: 4-door sedan
- Layout: Front-engine, rear-wheel-drive; Front-engine, four-wheel-drive (xDrive)
- Related: BMW 7 Series; Alpina XB7

Chronology
- Predecessor: Alpina B7 Turbo; Alpina B12

The Alpina B7 is a series of high performance executive cars (F-segment) by the German performance brand Alpina from 2004 to 2022, based on the BMW 7 Series.

== Predecessors (B7 Turbo) ==
=== First generation (E12/E24) ===
The first generation Alpina B7 Turbo is based on the BMW 5 Series (E12) 528i like its predecessor the B2, and was produced from 1978 to 1982. It features a B7 engine producing 221 kW (300 PS; 296 bhp) at 6,000 rpm and 462 N⋅m (341 ft⋅lbf) at 3,000 rpm. In 1981, Alpina introduced the B7 S Turbo with 243 kW (330 PS; 326 bhp) at 5,800 rpm and 500 N⋅m (369 ft⋅lbf) at 3,000 rpm. A total of sixty B7 S Turbos were produced. The B7 Turbo Coupe was based on the BMW 6 Series (E24).

=== Second generation (E28) ===
The second generation was produced from 1984 to 1987 and is based on the BMW 5 Series (E28).

== 7-series based models ==
=== Third generation (E65/E66) ===
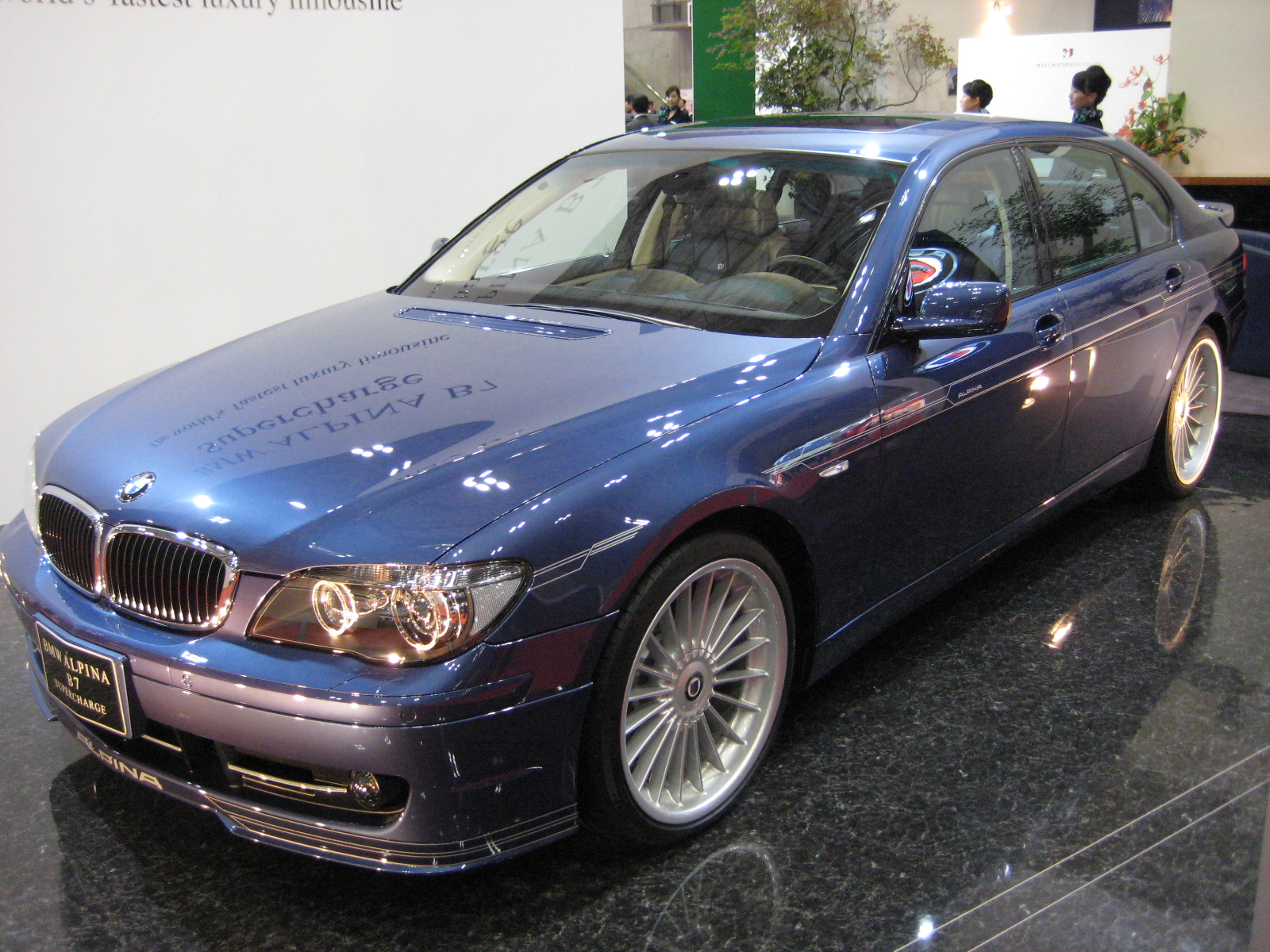
Alpina B7 (E65)

The third generation B7 was introduced in 2003 at the Frankfurt Motor Show, and is powered by a 4.4-liter supercharged V8, producing 493 hp (500 PS; 368 kW). It was introduced in the United States in 2006, and discontinued in 2008.

=== Fourth generation (F01/F02) ===
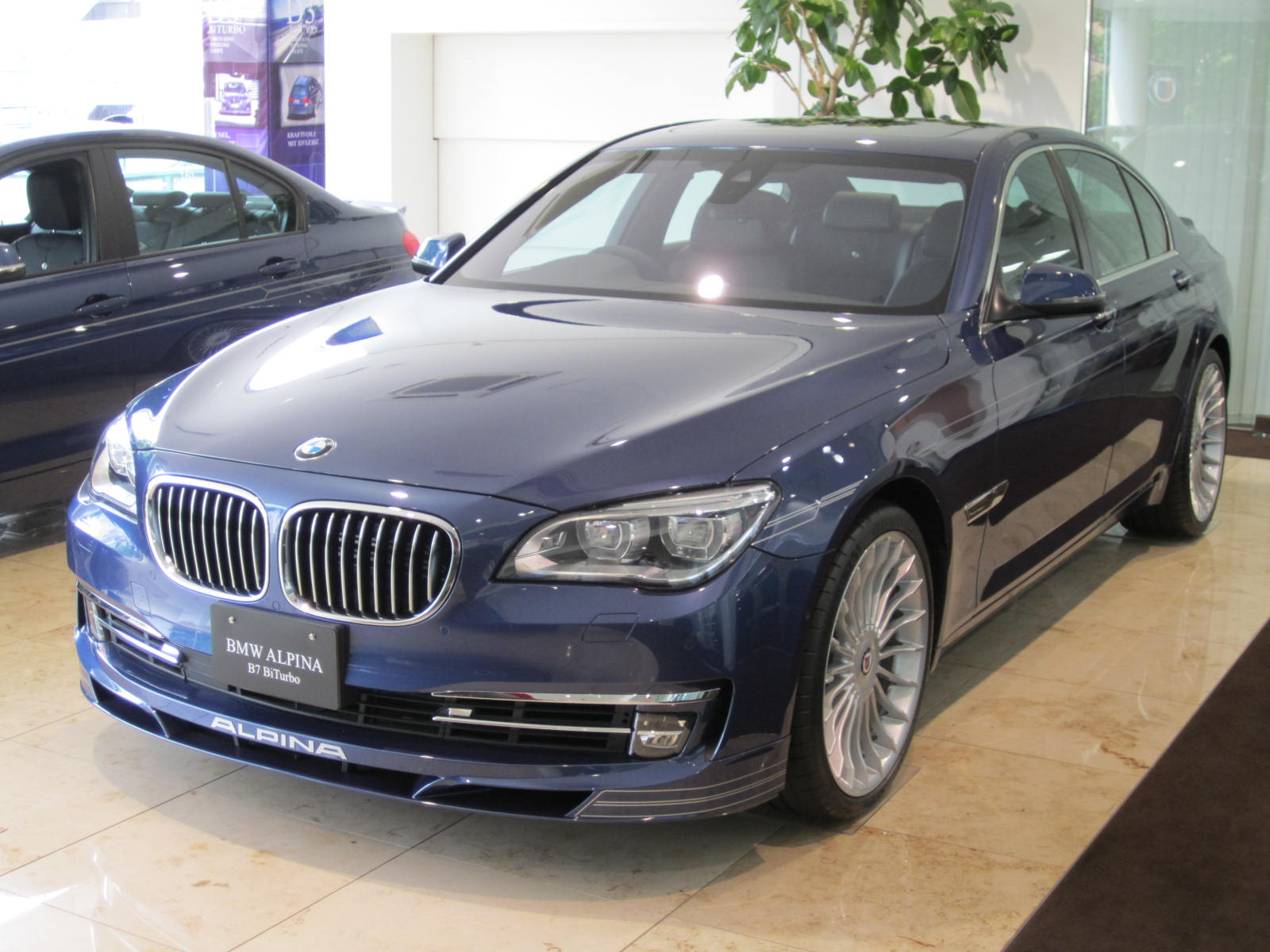
Blue Alpina B7 (F01)

The fourth generation B7 was released in 2011. It is powered by a 4.4-liter V8 producing 507 hp (514 PS; 378 kW). The 2013 facelift increased the power the power to 540 hp (547 PS; 403 kW).

=== Fifth generation (G12) ===
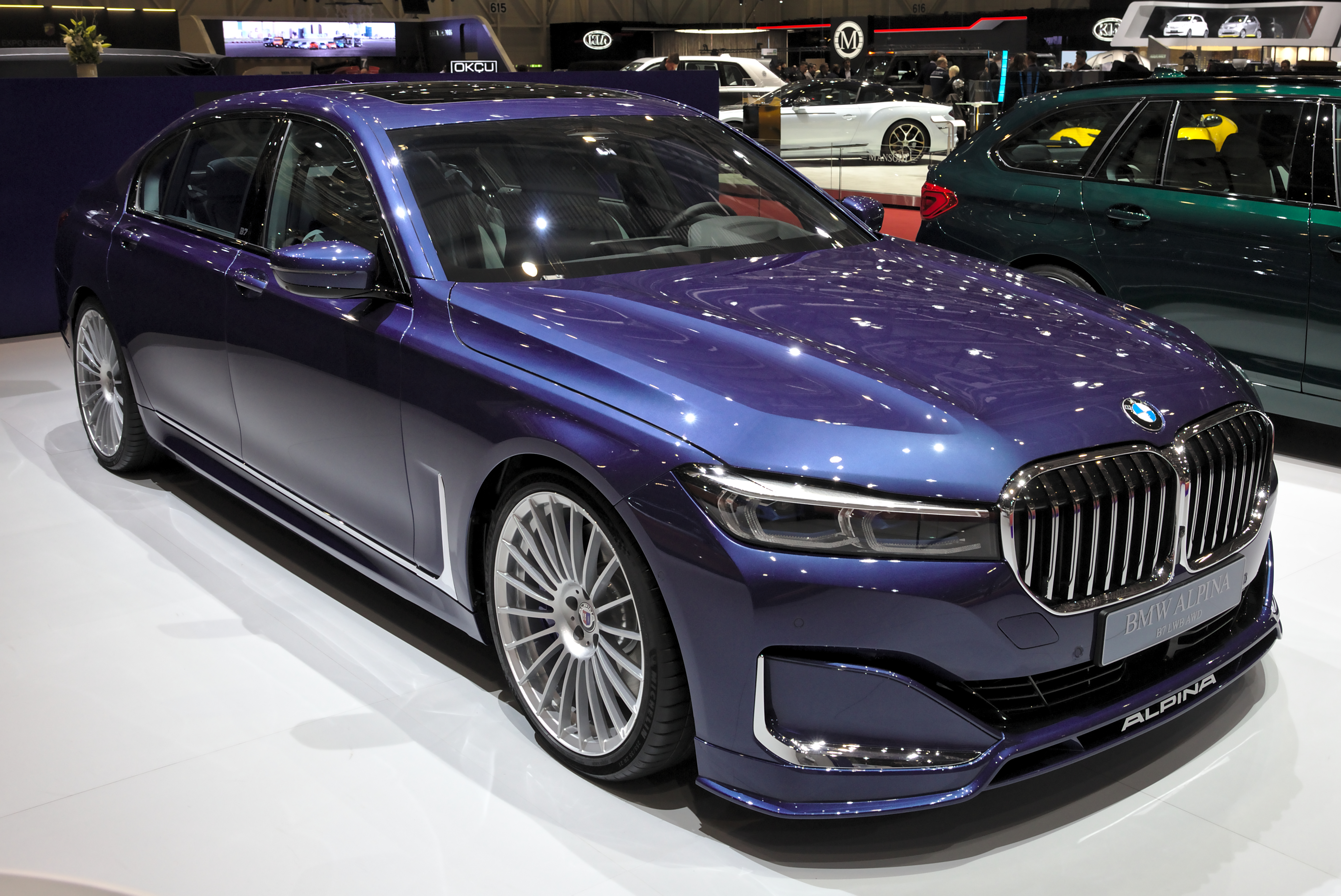
Alpina B7 (G12)

The fifth generation B7 was released in 2017. It is powered by a 4.4-liter twin-turbo V8 producing 600 hp (608 PS; 447 kW). In 2020, a facelift was released.

=== Sixth generation ===
An upcoming model was previewed in November 2026.
