= BMW 7 Series (G11) =

BMW 7 Series (G11/G12)
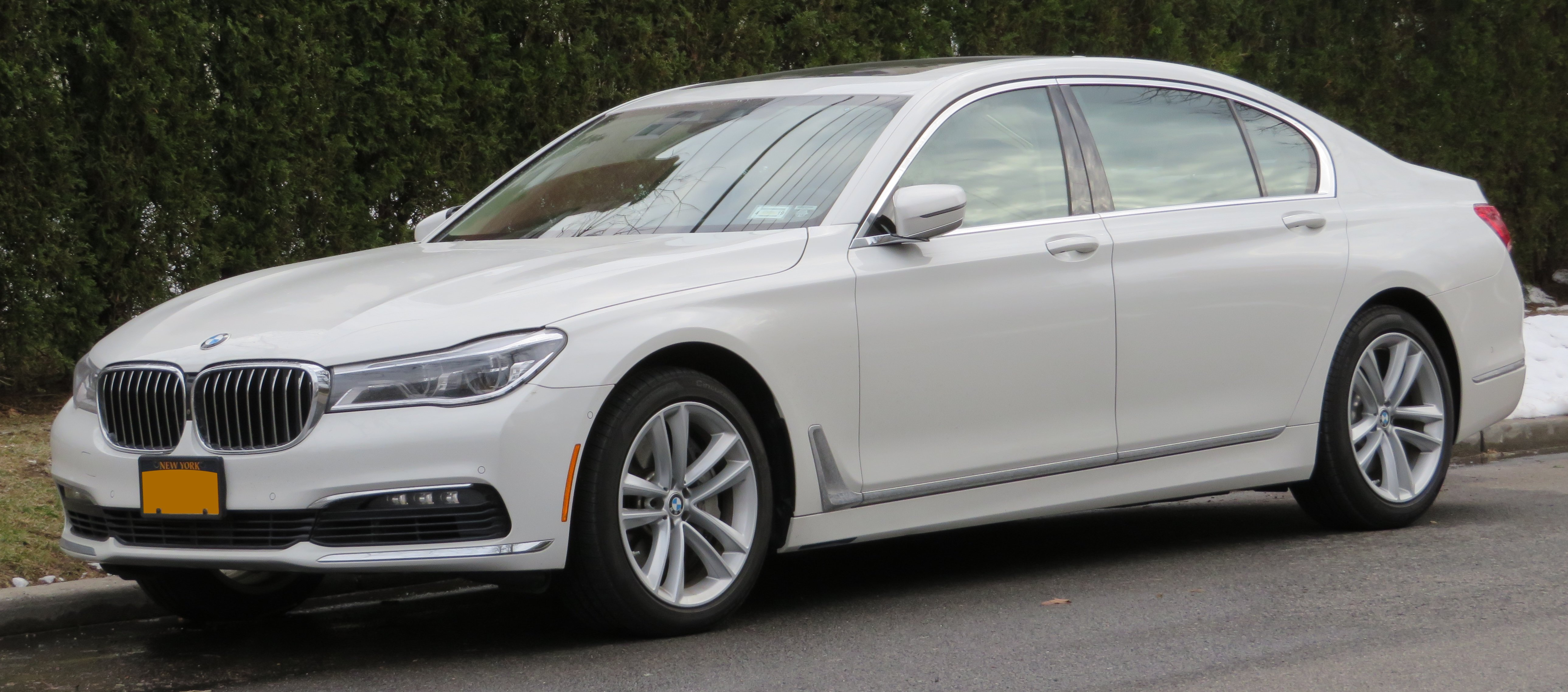

Overview
- Manufacturer: BMW
- Model code: G11 (short-wheelbase); G12 (long-wheelbase)
- Production: July 2015 – 2022
- Model years: 2016–2022
- Assembly: Germany: Dingolfing Malaysia: Kulim (Inokom) Indonesia: Jakarta (Gaya Motor) India: Chennai (BMW India)
- Designer: Nader Faghihzadeh; Alexey Kezha (facelift)

Body and chassis
- Class: Full-size luxury car (F)
- Body style: 4-door sedan
- Layout: Front-engine, rear-wheel-drive; Front-engine, all-wheel-drive (xDrive)
- Related: BMW 5 Series (G30); BMW 6 Series (G32)

Powertrain
- Engine: Petrol: 2.0 L B48 I4 turbo; 3.0 L B58 I6 turbo; 4.4 L N63 V8 twin-turbo; 6.6 L N74 V12 twin-turbo; Petrol plug-in hybrid: 2.0 L B48 I4 turbo; 3.0 L B58 I6 turbo; Diesel: 2.0 L B47 I4 turbo; 3.0 L B57 I6 turbo/quad-turbo
- Transmission: 8-speed automatic
- Hybrid drivetrain: Plug-in hybrid (740e/745e)

Dimensions
- Wheelbase: 3,070 mm (120.9 in); 3,210 mm (126.4 in) (LWB; G12)
- Length: 5,098–5,268 mm (200.7–207.4 in)
- Width: 1,902 mm (74.9 in)
- Height: 1,467–1,479 mm (57.8–58.2 in)
- Kerb weight: 1,755–2,255 kg (3,869–4,971 lb)

Chronology
- Predecessor: BMW 7 Series (F01)
- Successor: BMW 7 Series (G70)

The sixth generation of the BMW 7 Series consists of the BMW G11 (short-wheelbase version) and BMW G12 (long-wheelbase version) luxury saloons. The G11/G12 generation was produced by BMW from 2015 to 2022, and is often collectively referred to as the G11.

The G11 was unveiled on 10 June 2015 at BMW's headquarters in Munich. An official public reveal took place at the 2015 International Motor Show Germany. This generation of the 7 Series is the first car lineup of BMW to be based on the CLAR platform. The CLAR platform adopts technology first introduced in BMW i models, namely the introduction of carbon-fibre-reinforced polymer as structural chassis components. Long-wheelbase cars have the letter "L" in their model name.

As part of BMW's strategy of introducing plug-in hybrid variants for all future car models, the short and long-wheelbase models were available with hybrid powertrains as 740e and 740Le in 2016.

== Development and launch ==
The international launch of the new BMW 7 Series was at the 2015 Internationale Automobil-Ausstellung in Frankfurt am Main, Germany. Held in September 2015. The lead exterior designer is Nader Faghihzadeh and Alexey Kezha (facelift).

Production commenced in July 2015 at the Dingolfing manufacturing plant in Germany, with global vehicle sales starting in October 2015.

== Design ==
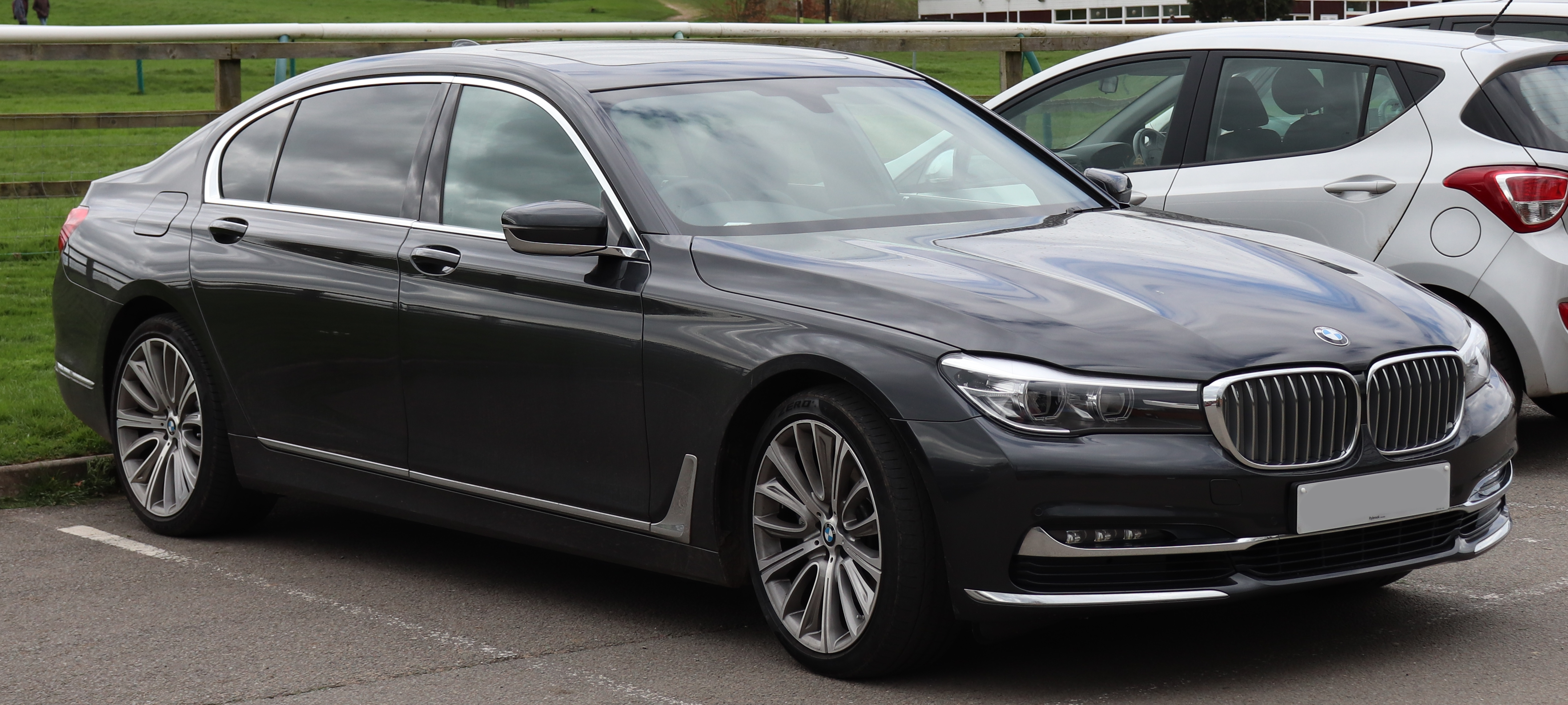
Exclusive

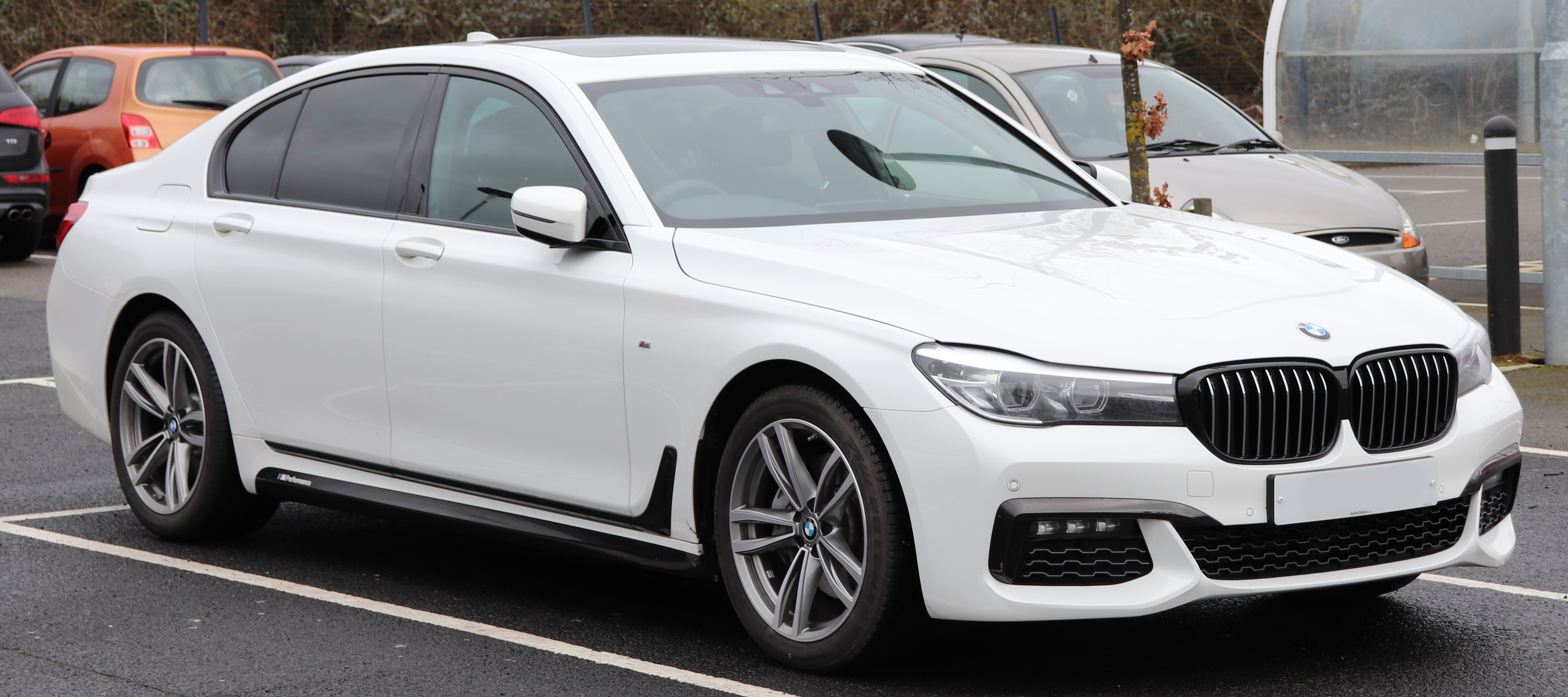

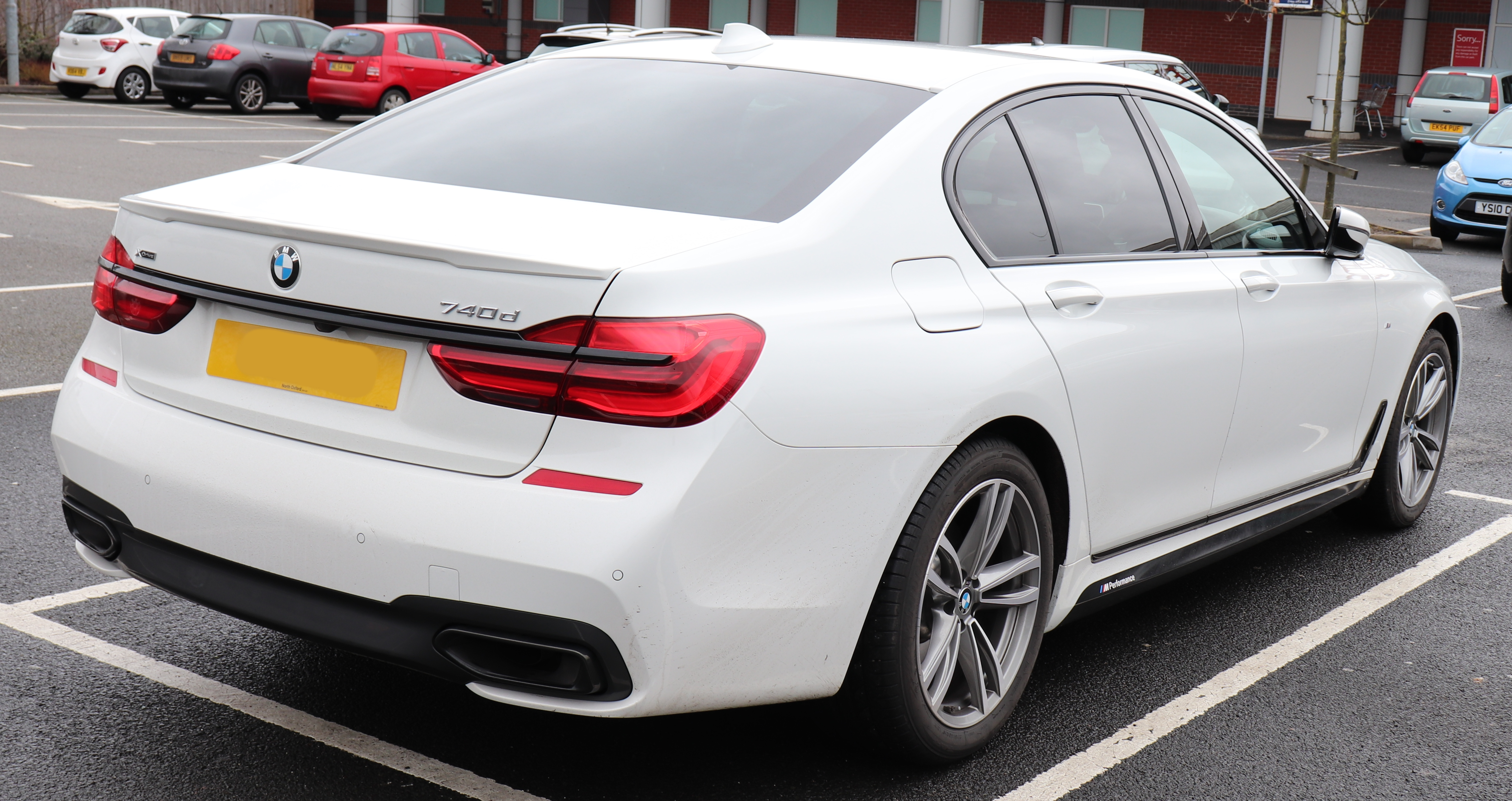
M Sport with M Performance side skirts

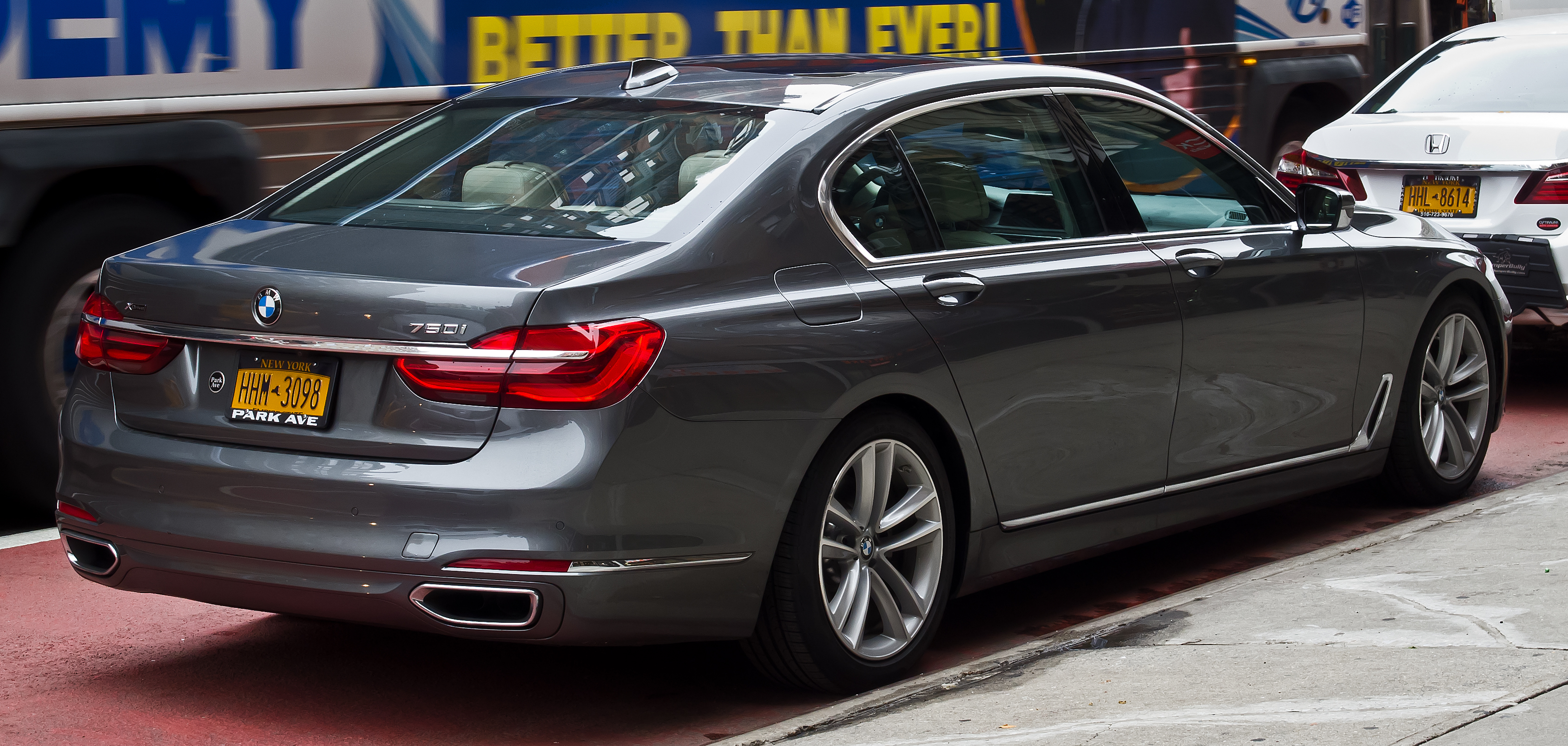
BMW 750Li long wheelbase (named 750i in the United States)

The G11 and G12, which are the respective codenames for the short and long wheelbase models, are the first passenger BMW vehicles to be based on the modular BMW CLAR (cluster architecture) platform.

The passenger cell of the 7 Series is made of carbon-fibre-reinforced polymer (CFRP), tensile steel and aluminium, resulting in a lower curb weight, lower centre of gravity and maintaining a 50/50 axle load distribution. The usage of CFRP allows for weight reduction due to being lighter than steel and aluminium. CFRP also increases structural strength in areas exposed to high steering forces, as it is capable of diverting impact forces to prevent deformations of the material, resulting in higher torsional rigidity. Aluminium has been applied to the doors, boot lid, brake system, wheel hubs and rear suspension arms, further reducing weight and unsprung masses. The G11's body weighs overall 40 kg (88 lb) less than that of its predecessor.

The front features a large signature kidney grille incorporating grille shutters that will only open when an increase of air flow to the engine bay is required, decreasing aerodynamic drag in the process. Along with air openings behind the front wheel arches that reduce turbulence in the wheel housings, the drag coefficient has been reduced to 0.24cd.

The standard self-levelling air suspension of the previous model has been reworked, featuring air springs at both axles with electronically controlled shock absorbers that can automatically adjust damping according to the environment. The active anti-roll system is optionally available with an electro-hydraulic actuator that improves damper reaction times. For the first time, four-wheel steering, marketed as Integral Active Steering, has also become available for all-wheel drive models.

== Equipment ==
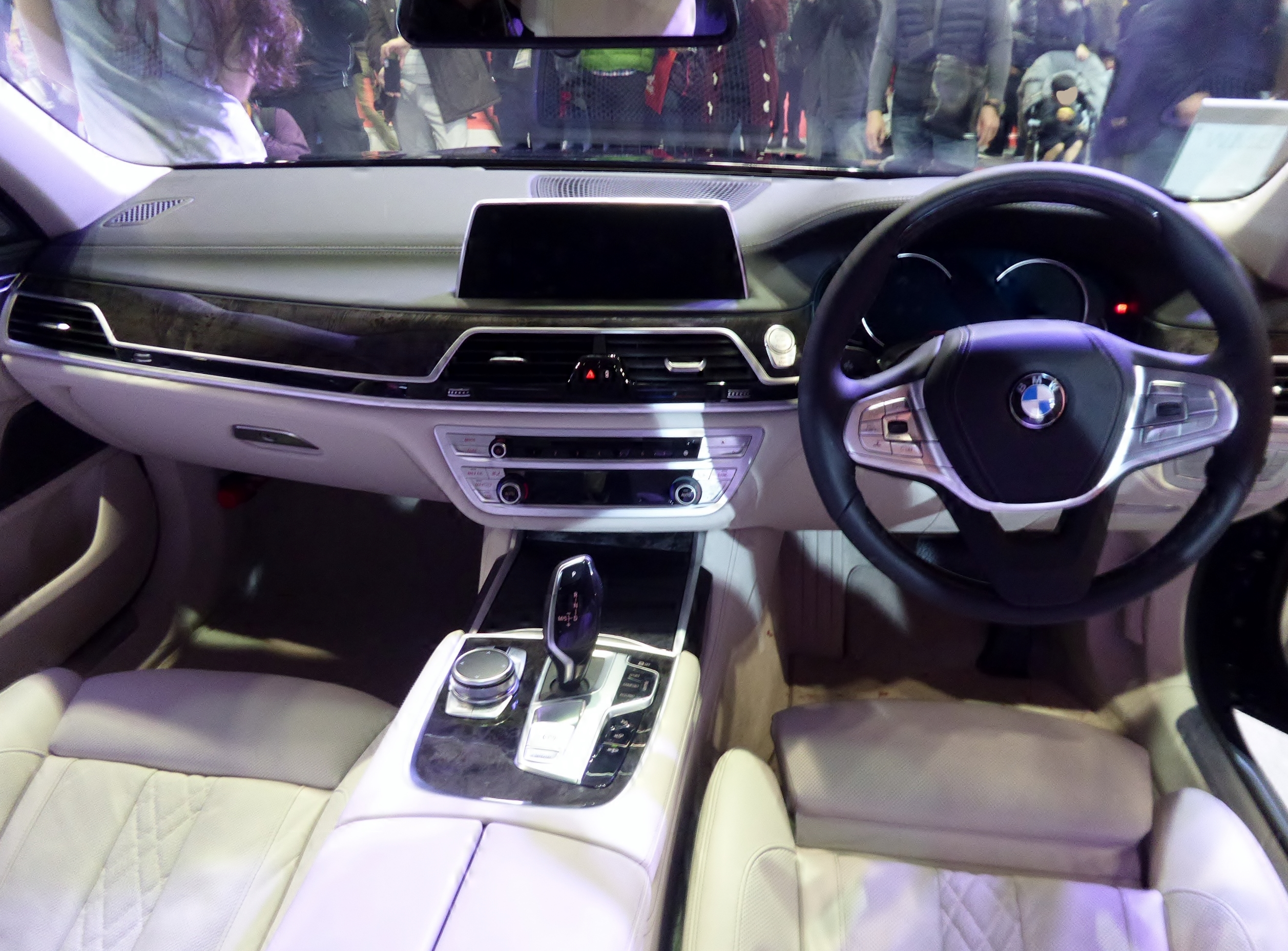
Interior (740d xDrive)

The iDrive operating system 6.0 for secondary car controls now receives user input from a conventional control wheel, touchscreen, voice commands and is capable of recognizing gestures through a 3D scanner, known as the Gesture Control. It is also possible to save a gesture movement with an individual function.

A number of advanced driver assistance systems for the BMW 7 Series have been reworked to work autonomously or partly so—the parking system utilises a number of radar sensors and a stereo camera at the rear, allowing it to execute parking manoeuvres independently and can be operated with a digital key fob. The cruise control driver assist is able to recognize speed limits and will adjust the vehicle's speed accordingly. The lane driving assist warns the driver of possible side or rear collisions. In addition, it is able to detect lane markings and traffic, as well as alter the steering responsiveness to improve driving comfort.

All models can be fitted with M Performance Parts. The parts are a black grille, carbon fibre mirrors, side skirts and sport brakes for facelift models.

== Engines ==
The powertrain line-up consists of a 4.4 litre V8 engine and three engines from BMW's modular B-series engine architecture—two 3.0 litre inline-six engines in petrol and diesel form, as well a 2.0 litre inline-four engine including the hybrid model designated as 740e/740Le, 730i/730Li for the petrol version and 725d/725Ld for diesel version. Initially, each model can be equipped with all-wheel drive and is mated to an 8-speed Steptronic ZF automatic transmission. The 750i/750Li, 740i/740Li, 740d/740Ld and 750d/750Ld models are optionally available with the all-wheel drive option xDrive. The transmission can be optionally linked with the satellite navigation system that provides the transmission with geographical data to adjust shift timing in relation to current driving conditions.

The G11/G12 is the first 7 Series generation to feature a plug-in hybrid variant, called the 740e/740Le iPerformance. This new model effectively replaces the rather undersold ActiveHybrid 7, which evolved from a 750i based mild hybrid to a 740i based full hybrid in 2014 post-LCI (Life Cycle Impulse) variant. The 740e/740Le is marketed as a BMW iPerformance car, not as a member of the BMW i sub-brand.

Petrol engines
Model	Years	Engine	Power	Torque
730i/730Li	2016–2022	2.0 L B48 I4 turbo	192 kW (257 hp; 261 PS)	400 N⋅m (295 lb⋅ft)
740i/740Li	2016–2019	3.0 L B58 I6 turbo	240 kW (322 hp; 326 PS)	450 N⋅m (332 lb⋅ft)
740i/740Li	2019-2022	3.0 L B58 I6 turbo	250 kW (335 hp; 340 PS)	450 N⋅m (332 lb⋅ft)
740e/740Le	2016–2019	2.0 L B48 I4 turbo + electric motor	240 kW (322 hp; 326 PS)	500 N⋅m (369 lb⋅ft)
745e/745Le	2019–2022	3.0 L B58 I6 turbo + electric motor	290 kW (389 hp; 394 PS)	600 N⋅m (443 lb⋅ft)
750i/750Li	2016–2019	4.4 L N63 V8 twin-turbo	330 kW (443 hp; 449 PS)	650 N⋅m (479 lb⋅ft)
750i/750Li	2019–2022	4.4 L N63 V8 twin-turbo	390 kW (523 hp; 530 PS)	750 N⋅m (553 lb⋅ft)
M760Li	2017–2019	6.6 L N74 V12 twin-turbo	448 kW (601 hp; 609 PS)	800 N⋅m (590 lb⋅ft)
M760Li	2019–2022	6.6 L N74 V12 twin-turbo	447 kW (600 hp; 608 PS) (US) 430 kW (577 hp; 585 PS) (EU)	850 N⋅m (627 lb⋅ft)
Alpina B7	2017–2022	4.4 L N63 V8 twin-turbo	447 kW (600 hp; 608 PS)	800 N⋅m (590 lb⋅ft)

Diesel engines
Model	Years	Engine	Power	Torque
725d/725Ld	2016-2019	2.0 L B47 I4 turbo	170 kW (228 hp; 231 PS)	500 N⋅m (369 lb⋅ft)
730d/730Ld	2016–2022	3.0 L B57 I6 turbo	195 kW (261 hp; 265 PS)	620 N⋅m (457 lb⋅ft)
740d/740Ld	2016–2022	3.0 L B57 I6 turbo	235 kW (315 hp; 320 PS)	680 N⋅m (502 lb⋅ft)
750d/750Ld	2017–2020	3.0 L B57 I6 quad turbo	294 kW (394 hp; 400 PS)	760 N⋅m (561 lb⋅ft)

== Special editions ==
=== 740e/740Le iPerformance ===
In February 2016, BMW announced the introduction of the "iPerformance" model designation, which was to be given to all BMW plug-in hybrid vehicles from July 2016. The aim is to provide a visible indicator of the transfer of technology from BMW i to the BMW core brand. The new designation will be used first on the plug-in hybrid variants of the latest BMW 7 Series, the BMW 740e/740Le iPerformance being the first of such plug-in hybrids.

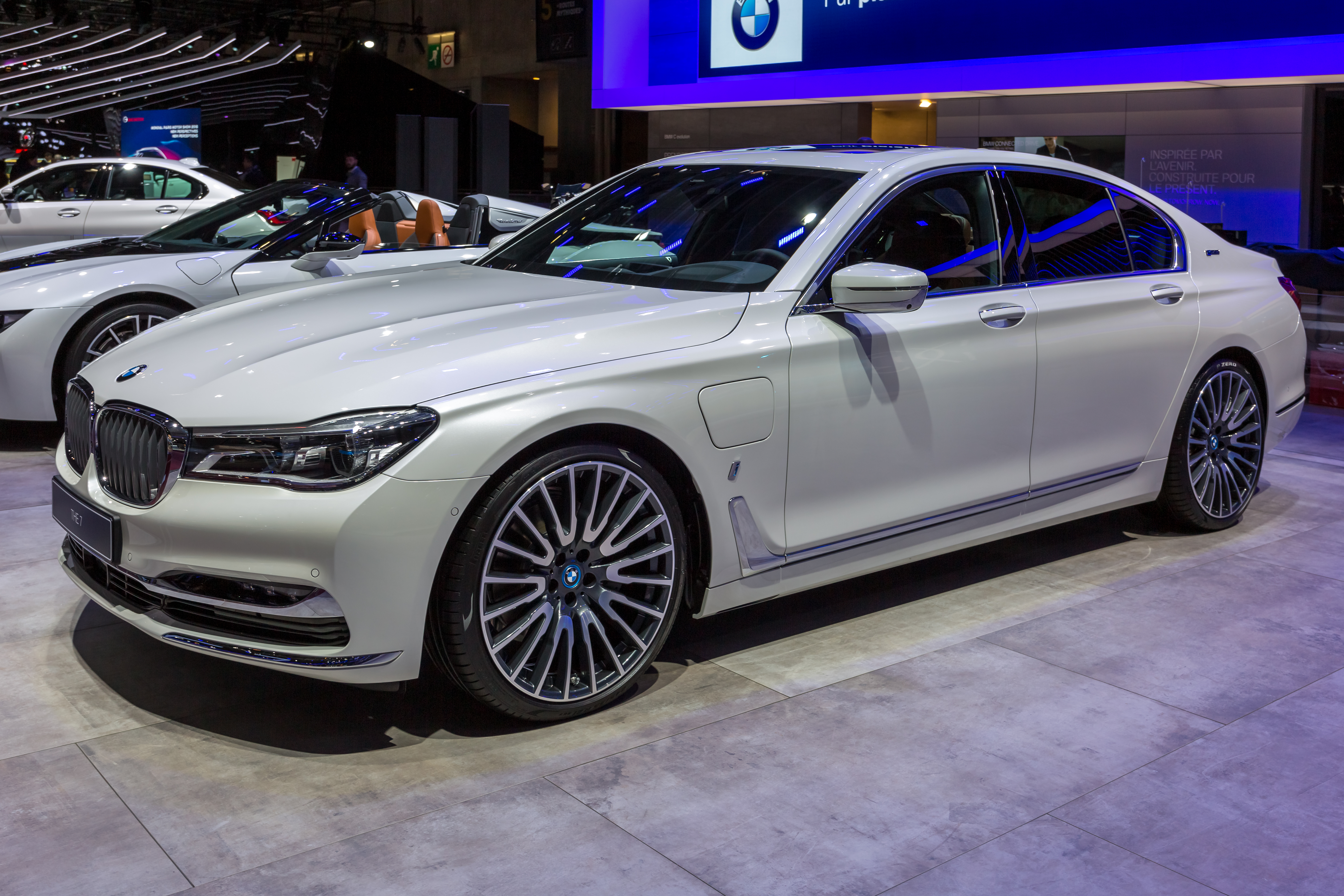
BMW 740e iPerformance

The 740e iPerformance was unveiled at the 2016 Geneva International Motor Show, together with the new BMW M760Li xDrive and the BMW i8 Protonic Red Edition special-edition model. Sales of the 740e/740Le iPerformance began in Germany in July 2016.

The 740e/740Le iPerformance features the same drivetrain as the BMW X5 xDrive40e plug-in hybrid, and has an all-electric range is 40 km (25 miles), dropping to 37 km (23 miles) in the xDrive version, both under the New European Driving Cycle (NEDC). Under the EPA test cycle, the all-electric range was rated at 23 km (14 miles). According to EPA, the 740e/740Le burns some petrol during the first 23 km (14 miles), so the actual all-electric range varies between 0 and 23 km (0 and 14 miles).

The 740e/740Le iPerformance mates a turbocharged 192 kW (257 hp) 2.0-litre, inline four petrol engine with an electric motor, resulting in a combined power output of 240 kW (322 hp) and 500 N⋅m (369 lb⋅ft) of torque. BMW's Auto eDrive function allows drivers to choose how the car operates and features modes for pure electric driving and performance. Drivers can also select from the usual Eco Pro, Comfort and Sport modes too. The 740e/740Le can be charged in less than four hours from a domestic socket, or in under three hours from a wall box charger. All models get an eight-speed automatic transmission as standard. The 740e can accelerate from 0–100 km/h (0–62 mph) in 5.6 seconds—the 740Le version is 0.1 seconds slower while the xDrive variant is 0.2 seconds faster.

Official fuel economy figures under the NEDC test are 2.100 L/100 km (134.5 mpg_{‑imp}; 112.0 mpg_{‑US}), with CO_{2} emissions of 49 g/km (2.8 oz/mi). The 740e is available in both standard and long-wheelbase forms, and also as an all-wheel drive xDrive variant. In all-wheel drive variation, the 740e returns 2.300 L/100 km (122.8 mpg_{‑imp}; 102.3 mpg_{‑US}) and emits 53 g/km (3.0 oz/mi) of CO_{2}. Under the EPA test cycle, the BMW 740e xDrive iPerformance has a combined city/highway fuel economy rating of 3.7 L/100 km (64 mpg_{‑US}; 76.9 mpg_{‑imp}), corresponding to an energy consumption of 1.2 MJ/km (52 kWh/100 mi). When running only on gasoline, the EPA-rated fuel economy is 8.7 L/100 km (27 mpg_{‑US}; 32 mpg_{‑imp}).

=== Alpina B7 ===
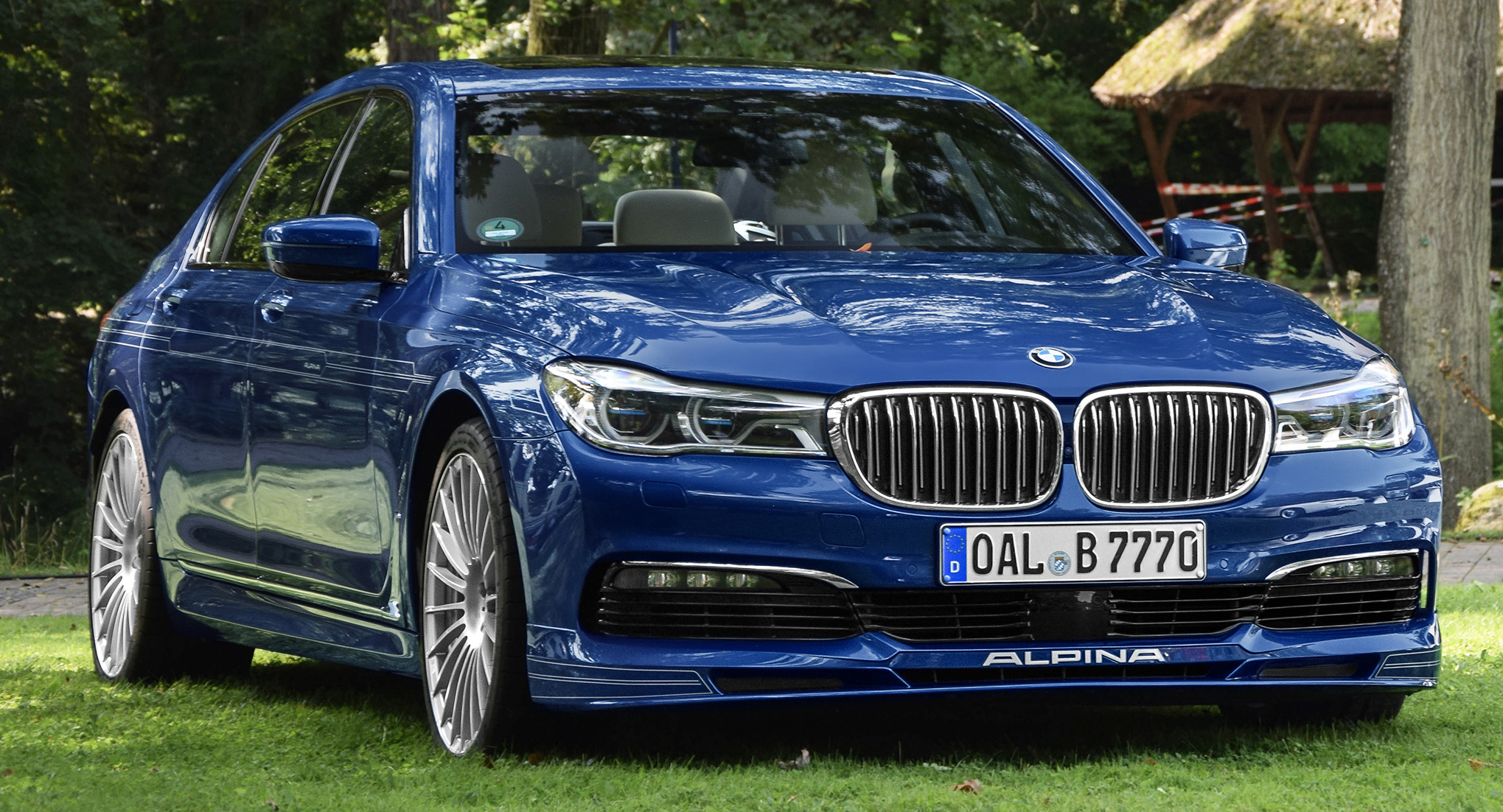
Alpina B7 Bi-Turbo

The Alpina B7 xDrive was announced by BMW North America in February 2016, and was unveiled at the 2016 Geneva Motor Show, with sales starting in September. The B7 uses a modified version of the 750Li's 4.4-litre twin-turbocharged V8 engine, designated the N63M30, producing 600 hp (447 kW; 608 PS) and 800 N⋅m (590 lb⋅ft) of torque. It also features a more luxurious interior. With an electronically limited top speed of 310 km/h (193 mph) and a 0–100 km/h (0–62 mph) acceleration time of 3.7 seconds, as well as a number of other changes to make the car sportier, it is considered the sportiest 7 Series model. The B7 is sold by BMW only in the United States and Canada. The B7 is sold in other countries by Alpina as the B7 Bi-Turbo, with a delimited top speed of 330 km/h (205 mph).

The facelift model was unveiled on 11 February 2019. The power band of the engine is improved, with the maximum 800 N⋅m (590 lb⋅ft) of torque now being available from 2,000 rpm, and the output of 600 hp (447 kW; 608 PS) between 5,500 and 6,500 rpm. Acceleration from 0–100 km/h (62 mph) is achieved in 3.6 seconds while the 330 km/h (205 mph) top speed is now unlimited worldwide. Public introduction took place at the 2019 Geneva Motor Show and deliveries began during July.

=== M760Li xDrive ===
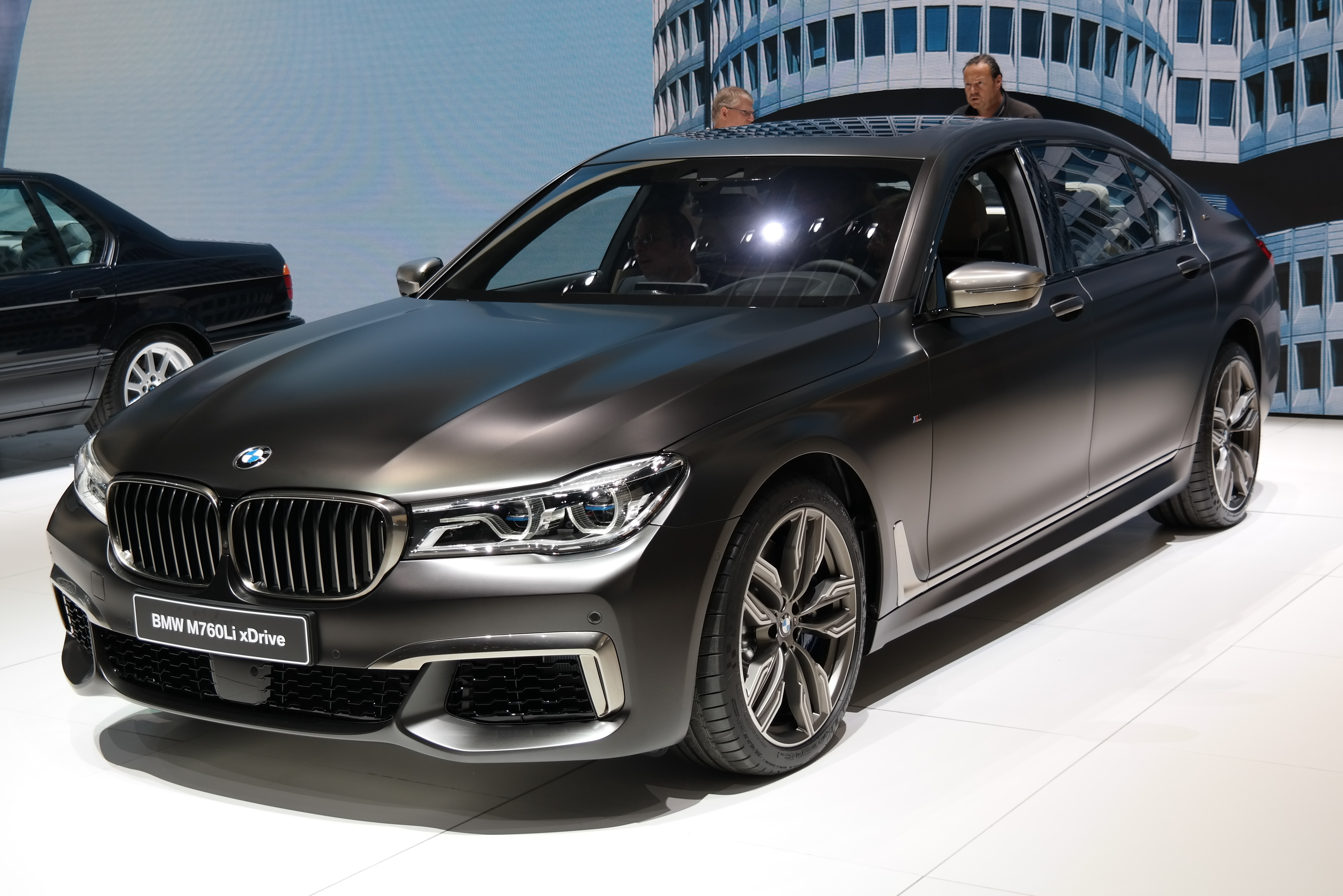
BMW M760Li

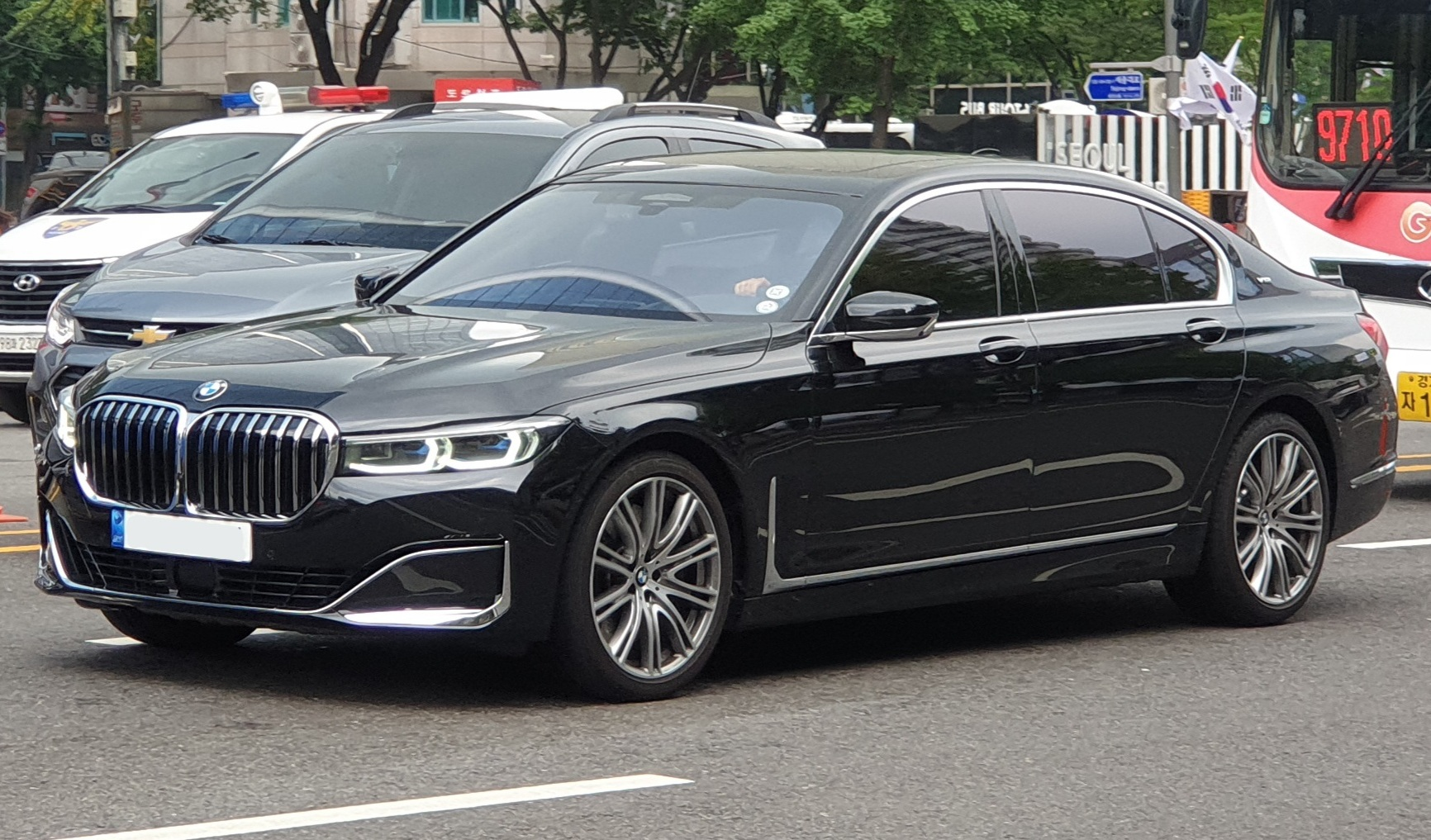
BMW M760Li Excellence (facelift)

The M760Li xDrive is the top trim of the 7 Series. It was unveiled in February 2016 and made its official public debut at the 2016 Geneva Motor Show. It is powered by BMW's N74B66 engine, a 6.6-litre twin-turbocharged V12 which generates a maximum power output of 448 kW (601 hp; 609 PS) and 800 N⋅m (590 lb⋅ft) of torque. If the optional M Driver's Package is specified, the limited top speed is raised to 305 km/h (190 mph), versus 250 km/h (155 mph) as standard. As the first 7 Series to be an M Performance model, the M760Li receives technical upgrades over the standard 7 Series as standard equipment, including M Performance-specific tuning of the transmission's shift programmes, 19-inch (480 mm) M Sport brakes, an M Sport exhaust system, performance tyres and standard fit Integral Active Steering. It is also the first V12-powered BMW model ever made to feature xDrive as standard, breaking the trend of the previous V12-engined BMWs which were only rear-wheel drive.

The M760Li features several visual cues to differentiate it from base 7 Series models. These include a 20-inch alloy wheel design exclusive to the M760Li. Several pieces of exterior trim are finished in "Cerium Grey", most notably the mirror caps, side "Air Breathers" and the tailpipe embellishers. There are V12 badges on the C-pillars, and a unique tailpipe design at the rear.

The M760Li can also be specified as an "Excellence" top of the range model. This receives modifications to the exterior and interior which create a more luxurious appearance, compared to the sporty aesthetics of the standard M760Li.

==== Final V12 ====
On 18 January 2022, BMW announced a new limited edition M760Li xDrive simply called "The Final V12." As the name suggests, it will be the last BMW series production vehicle to be fitted with a V-12 engine. Built exclusively for the United States, just 12 examples were sold to the public. BMW said they approached previous buyers with a history of V-12 BMW ownership with an invitation to purchase the Final V12.

== Facelift ==
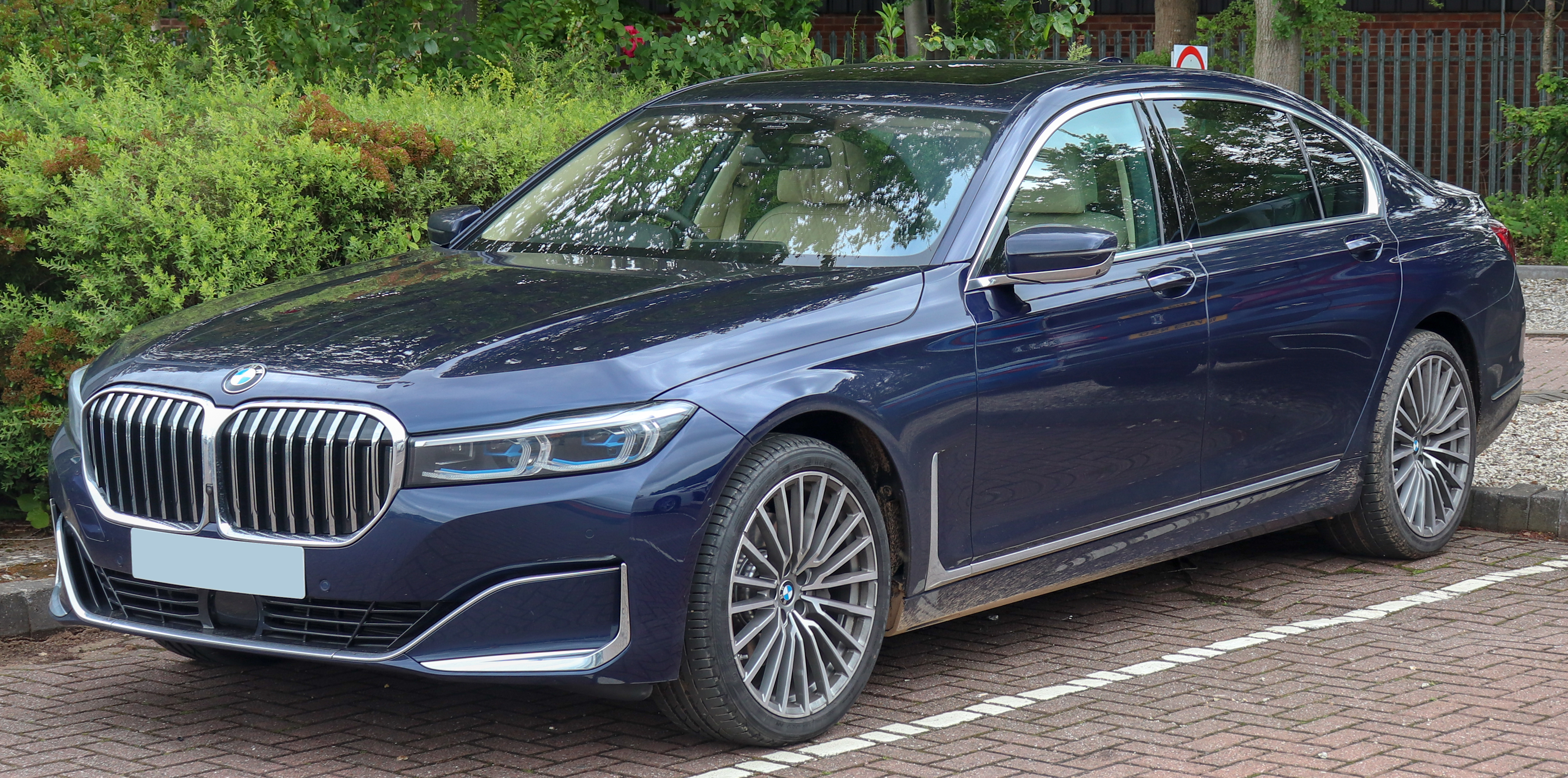
BMW 740Li (facelift)

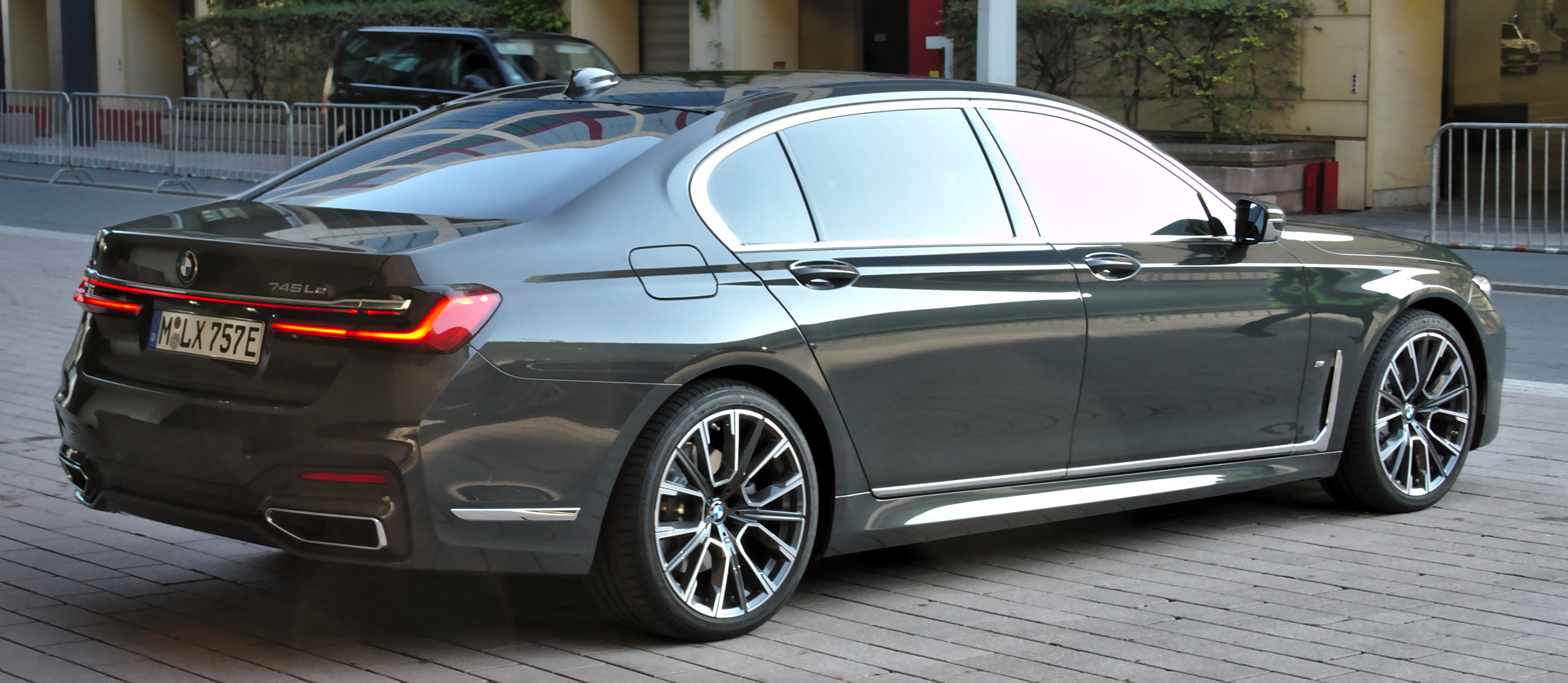
BMW 745Le (facelift)

The updated 7 Series models were unveiled on 16 January 2019 as 2020 model year cars. Production began two months later in March. Notable changes of the facelift include a larger kidney grille shared with the X7 (40 percent larger than the outgoing model) and sleeker headlights with optional laser headlights. The V8 models and the hybrid models were updated and a new hands-free driving system which operates under certain conditions was added to the range.

The new front is accompanied by a more prominent front fascia and a power dome on the bonnet. The rear of the car gained LED tail lamps joined by a central stripe and a new rear bumper. Other exterior changes included new optional 20-inch (510 mm) wheels.

Updates to the interior included a new 12.3-inch (310 mm) instrument cluster and a 10.25-inch (260 mm) infotainment screen. A new voice assistant was also added to the infotainment system along with the BMW iDrive system 7.0 with updated graphics and menus. The main technological feature is the Extended Traffic Jam Assistant which allows the driver to leave the steering wheel at speeds up to 56 km/h (35 mph) during urban city driving. The system manages steering, acceleration and braking of the car and cameras ensure that the driver pays attention on the road.

The turbocharged B58 inline-6 in the 740i/740Li was now rated at 250 kW (335 hp) and 450 N⋅m (332 lb⋅ft) of torque.

The 750i/750Li now shared the same engine enhancements as the M850i which now generates a power output of 390 kW (523 hp) and 750 N⋅m (553 lb⋅ft) of torque. The rear-wheel-drive option for the 750i/750Li was discontinued, making the 740i/740Li the only model to be available with optional rear-wheel-drive.

The 740e/740Le hybrid model was discontinued in favour of the updated 745e/745Le iPerformance. The 745e/745Le iPerformance uses a turbocharged inline-6 engine shared with the X5 xDrive45e. The new engine combined with electric motors generates a power output of 290 kW (389 hp) and 600 N⋅m (443 lb⋅ft) of torque. A new 12 kW⋅h battery pack is employed for the electric motors to increase the electric range.

The engine in the European M760Li xDrive saw a decrease in power output to 430 kW (577 hp), due to the integration of Otto particle filters in the exhaust to meet emissions standards, while the US model saw a decrease to 447 kW (600 hp). Torque increased, though, to 850 N⋅m (627 lb⋅ft) for both European and US models.

The updated 7 Series models went on sale in April 2019.

In Malaysia, the facelift 7 series 745Le is known as 740Le.

In Thailand, the 730Ld, 745Le xDrive, and M760Li xDrive are offered.

== Production ==
The G11 was produced at the BMW Group Plant Dingolfing in Germany. Complete knock-down (CKD) assembly is conducted in Jakarta, Indonesia and at the BMW Thailand plant in Rayong. It is also produced in India at BMW Group Plant, Chennai.

== Reception ==
The 2016 7-series was named one of the top ten tech cars in 2016 by IEEE Spectrum.
