= BMW X7 =

Full-size luxury crossover SUV

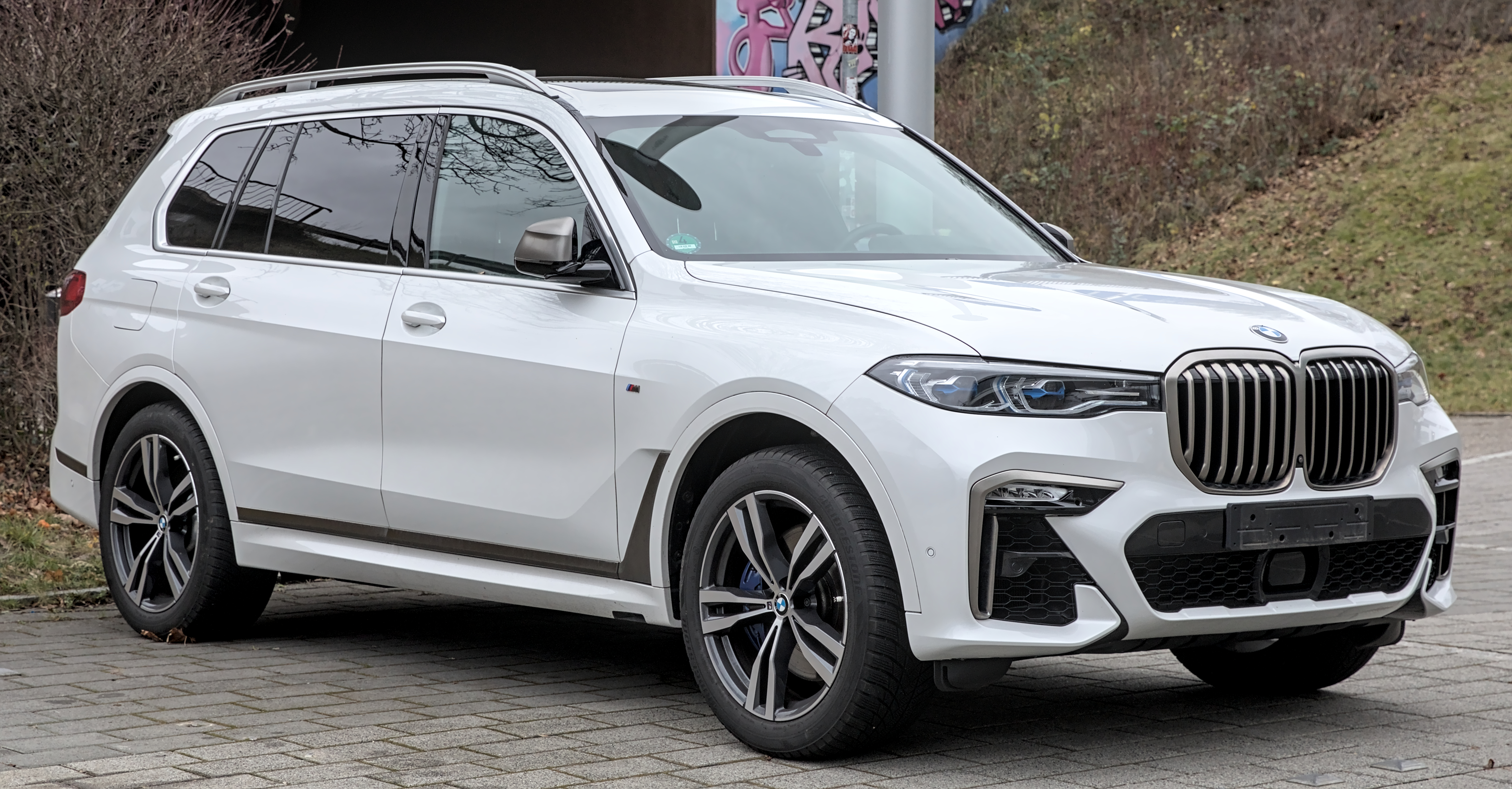
- BMW X7 M50i

Overview
- Manufacturer: BMW
- Model code: G07
- Production: December 2018 – present
- Model years: 2019–present
- Assembly: United States: Greer, South Carolina (Plant Spartanburg); Thailand: Rayong (BMW Thailand); India: Chennai (BMW India); Malaysia: Kulim (Inokom); Indonesia: Jakarta (Gaya Motor)
- Designer: Julien Sarreméjean; Anders Thøgersen (facelift)

Body and chassis
- Class: Full-size luxury crossover SUV
- Body style: 5-door SUV
- Layout: Front-engine, all-wheel drive (xDrive)
- Platform: Cluster Architecture (CLAR)
- Related: BMW X5 (G05/G18); BMW X6 (G06); BMW XM; BMW 7 Series (G11)

Powertrain
- Engine: Petrol: 3.0 L B58 turbo I6; 4.4 L N63 twin-turbo V8; 4.4 L S68 twin-turbo V8; Diesel: 3.0 L B57 turbo I6; 3.0 L B57 twin-turbo I6; 3.0 L B57 quad-turbo I6
- Transmission: 8-speed ZF 8HP automatic
- Hybrid drivetrain: MHEV

Dimensions
- Wheelbase: 3,105 mm (122.2 in)
- Length: 5,151–5,181 mm (202.8–204.0 in)
- Width: 2,000 mm (78.7 in)
- Height: 1,805–1,835 mm (71.1–72.2 in)
- Curb weight: 2,320–2,460 kg (5,115–5,423 lb)

The BMW X7 is a full-size luxury crossover sport utility vehicle manufactured by BMW. It is BMW's largest and second most expensive SUV in its line-up, and is considered a flagship SUV for the brand, and borrows design cues from the 6th and 7th generations of the BMW 7 Series. The X7 was first announced by BMW in March 2014. It was officially unveiled on October 17, 2018, with pre-orders being taken online. The X7 has been available at dealers since March 2019.

== Launch and development ==
BMW provided a preview of the upcoming X7 with the showing of the Concept X7 iPerformance at the 2017 International Motor Show in Frankfurt. Production of the X7 started in 2018 at the BMW US Manufacturing Company plant in Greer, South Carolina.

The X7 is built on the same BMW CLAR platform as the G05 X5, however the X7 is taller and wider plus it has been stretched for increased cargo space and third row seating which is standard and more spacious for adults (the X5's third row seating, which is optional, is mainly for children). In contrast to the X5, it is not available with rear-wheel drive, instead using an all-wheel drive (xDrive) drivetrain for all models. In Europe, diesel and petrol engines are available, while the choice is limited to inline-6 and V8 petrol engines in the United States.

The G07 features a self-levelling air suspension system, with a double-wishbone front suspension and multi-link rear suspension. It can be raised or lowered by 40 mm (1.6 in) and will automatically lower the car by 20 mm (0.8 in) at speeds of over 138 km/h (86 mph). The boot capacity is rated at 326 litres (11.5 cu ft), and 2,120 litres (75 cu ft) with the seats folded down.

All petrol and diesel models feature engine particulate filters and meet the Euro 6d-TEMP emissions standard. The xDrive50i model is available outside the European markets, while the European markets will get the M50i models.

In July 2019, a pickup truck concept car was unveiled, though not intended for production.

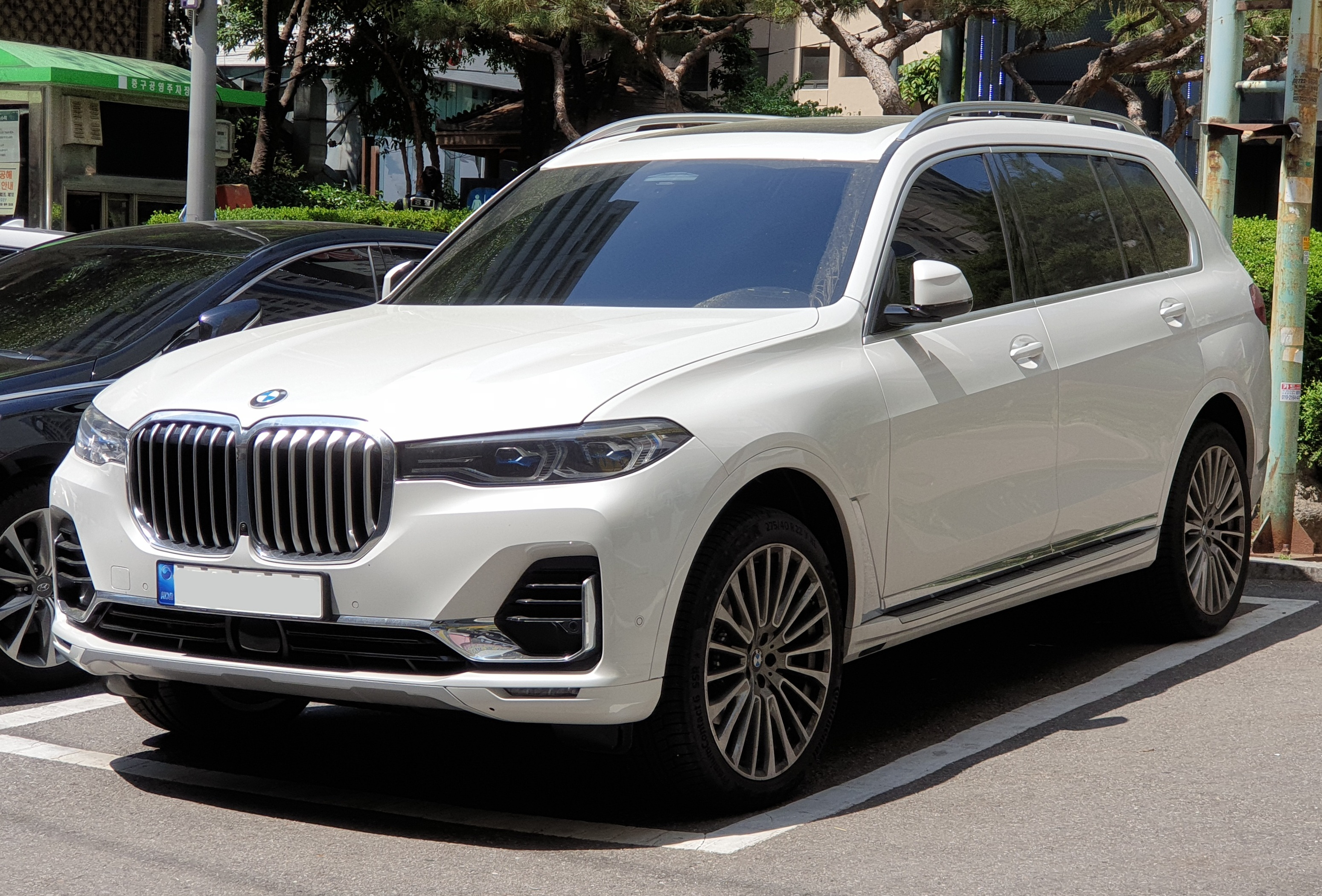
2020 BMW X7 xDrive 40i

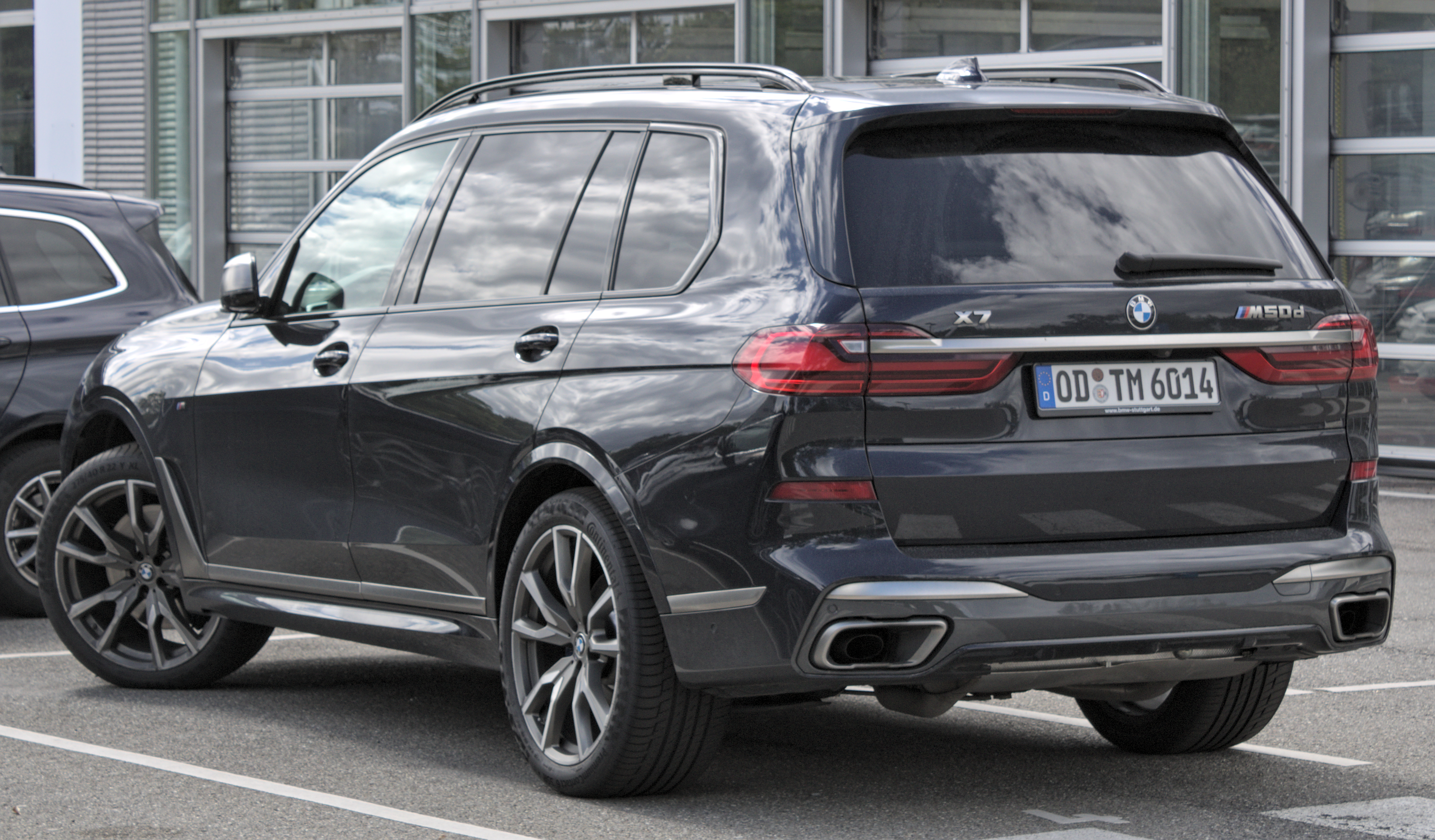
2020 BMW X7 M50d (G07)

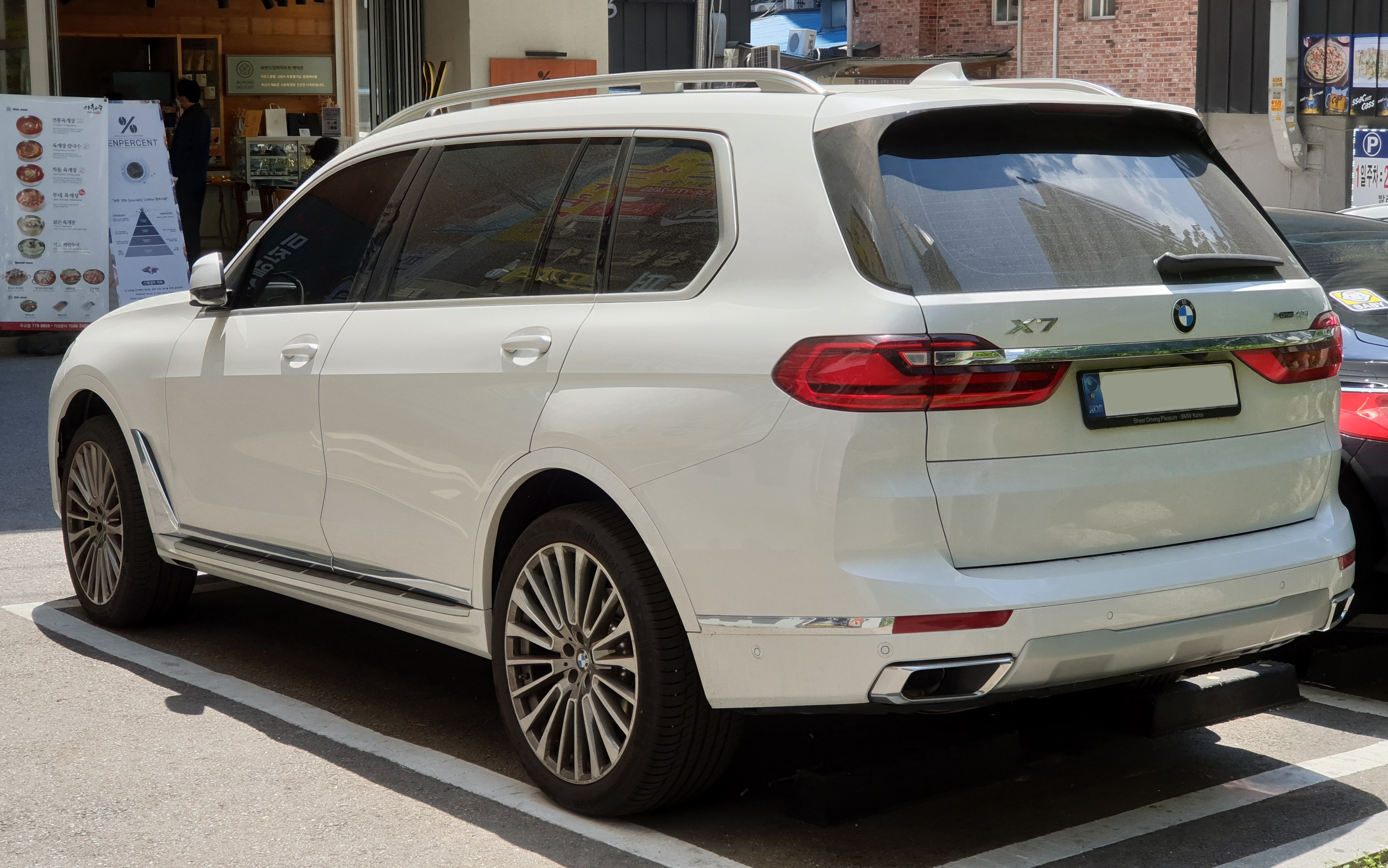
2019 BMW X7 xDrive 40i

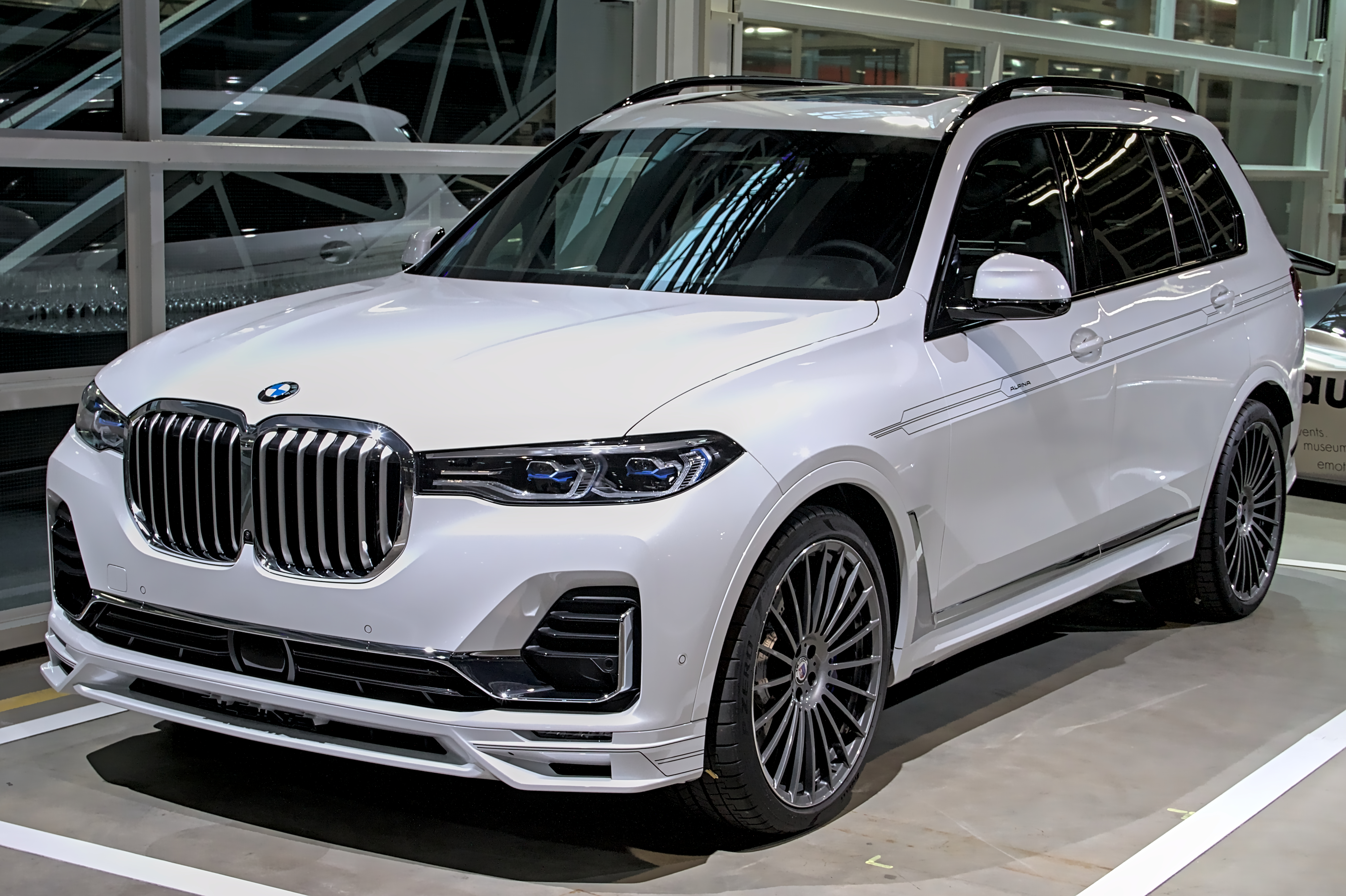
2021 Alpina XB7

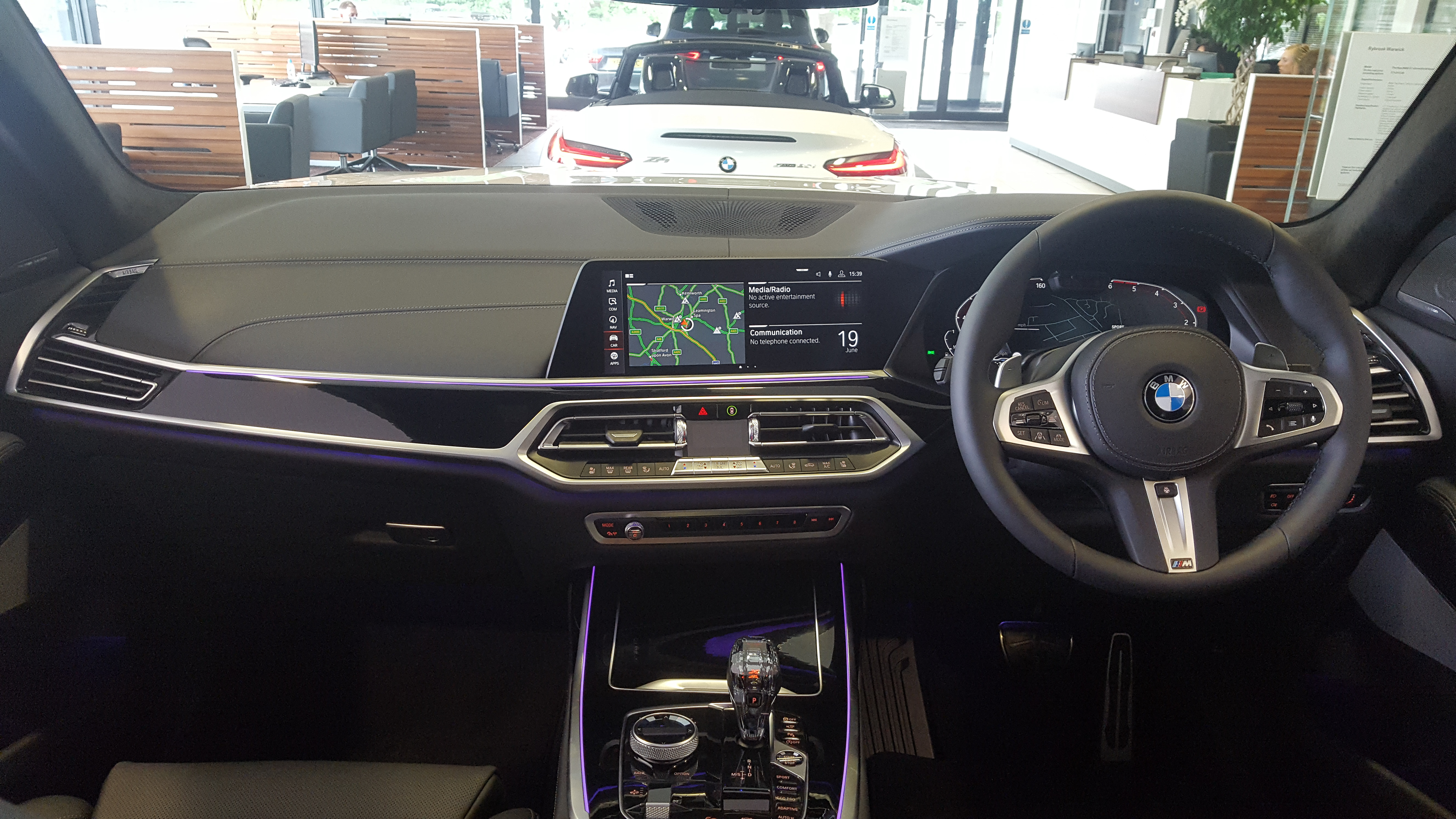
Interior (pre-facelift)

== Facelift ==
In April 2022, BMW unveiled a new revised X7, which entered production in July and was launched the following month. The design is very similar to the original first generation design, with minimal changes to the side profile and rear. The major changes are a heavily revised front end design premiering new "horizontally split headlight units" and a revised curved widescreen focused dashboard within an otherwise largely unchanged interior. It is widely thought that the aesthetic function of the horizontally split headlights is to increase the proportion of the front design dedicated to the headlights relative to a very large kidney grille. The new headlights were also featured on the new 7 Series and i7. The revision also includes all vehicles having an MHEV powertrain.

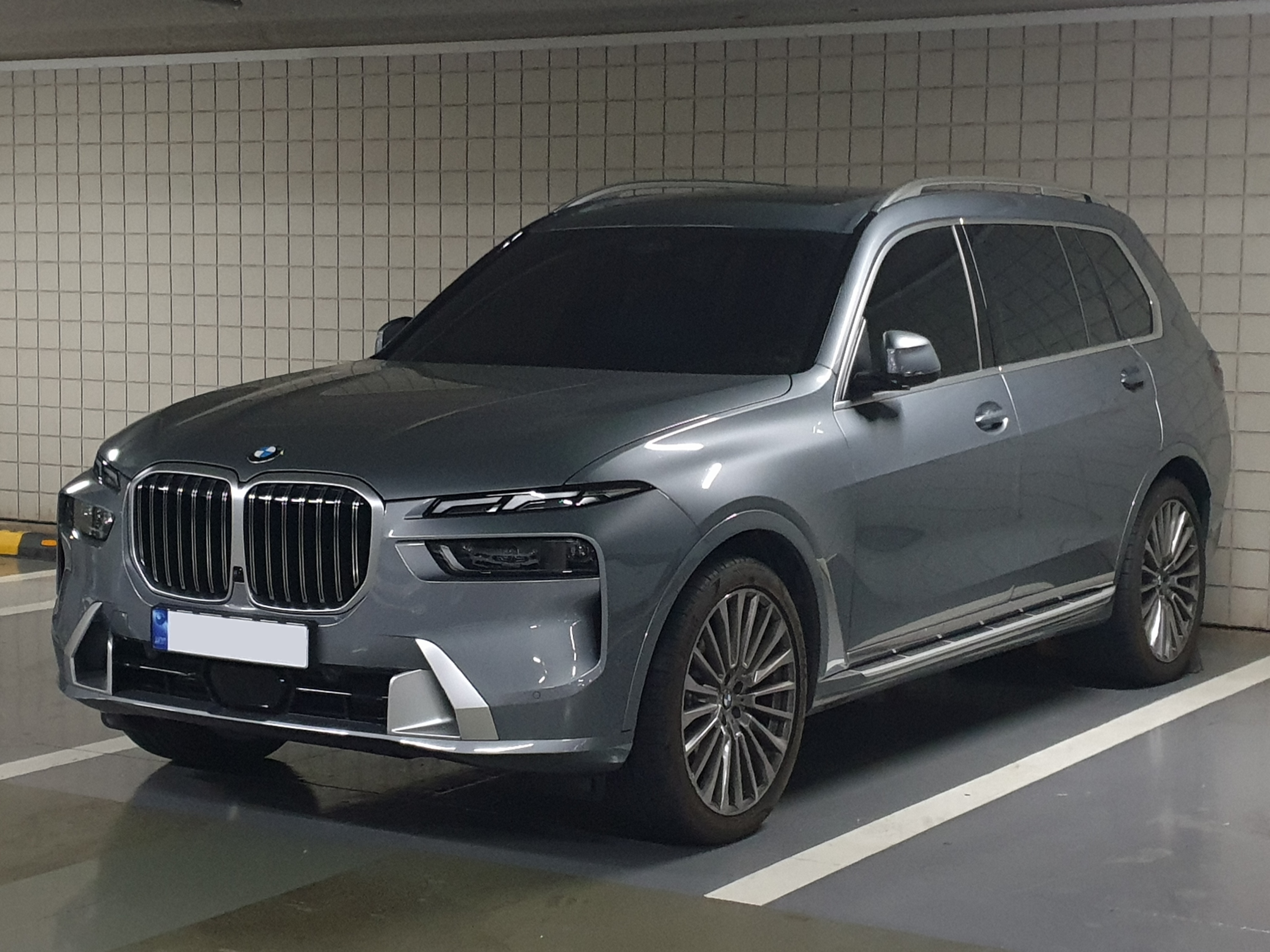
2022 BMW X7

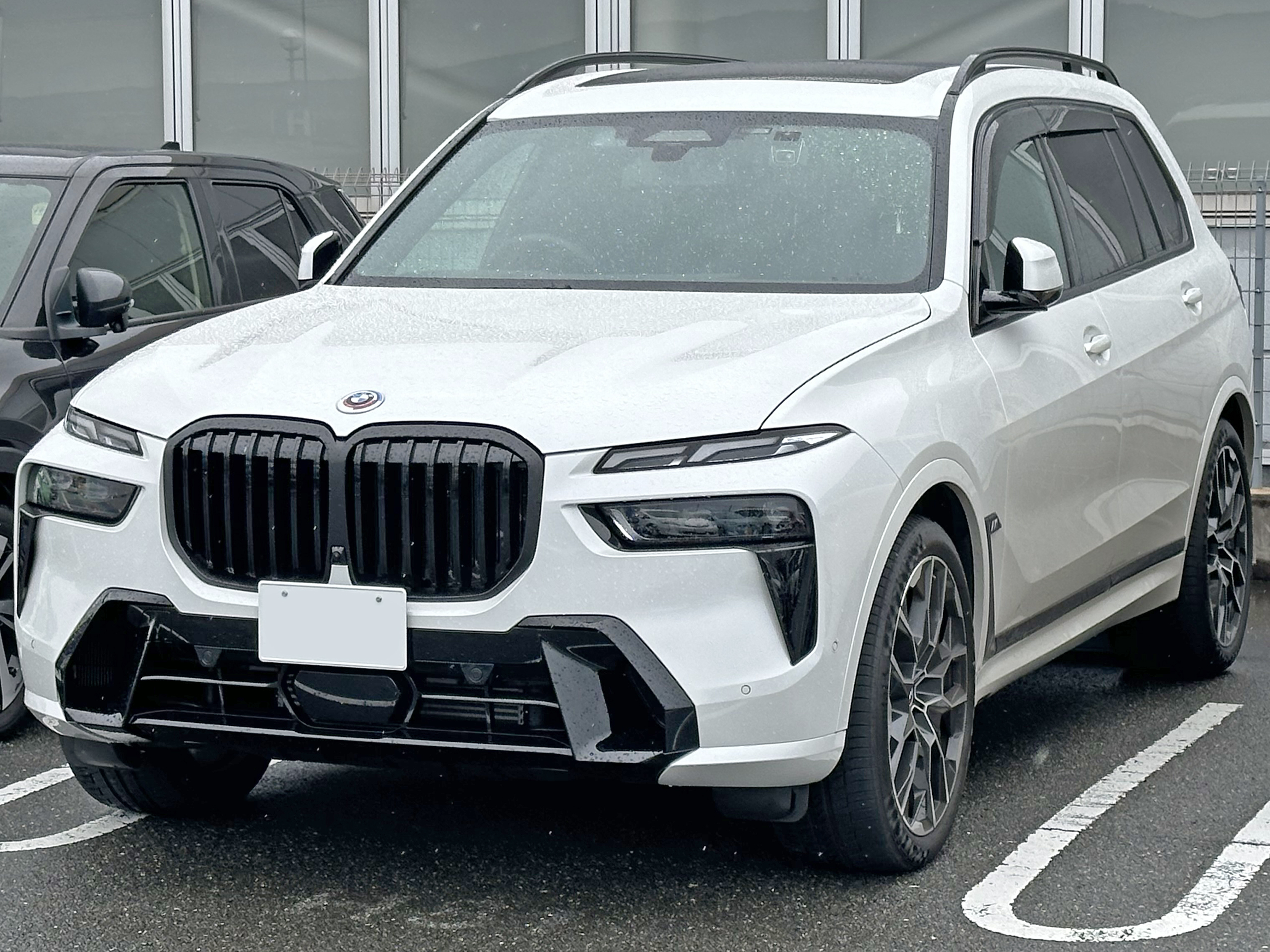
2022 BMW X7 with M Sport Package

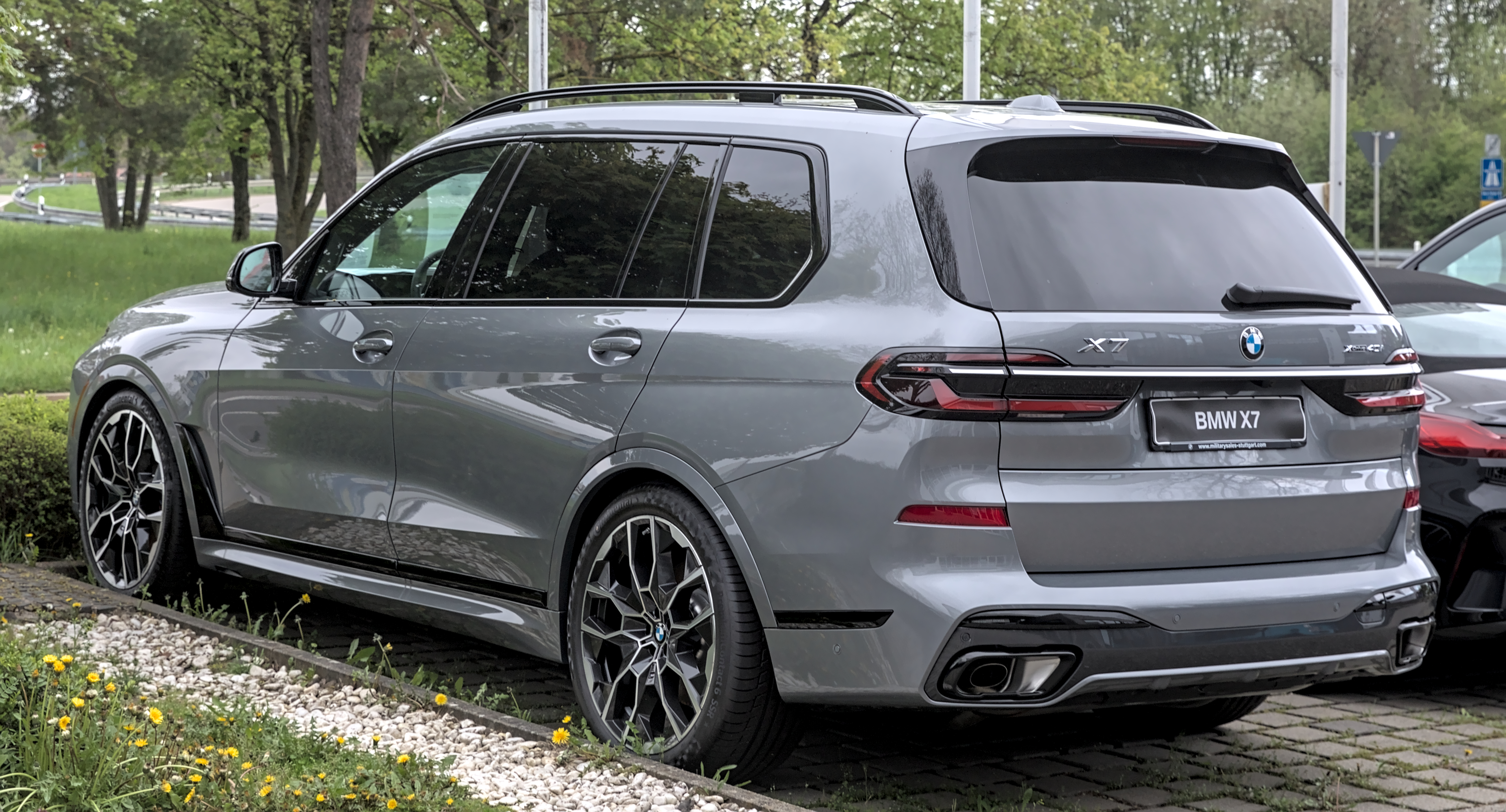
2022 BMW X7

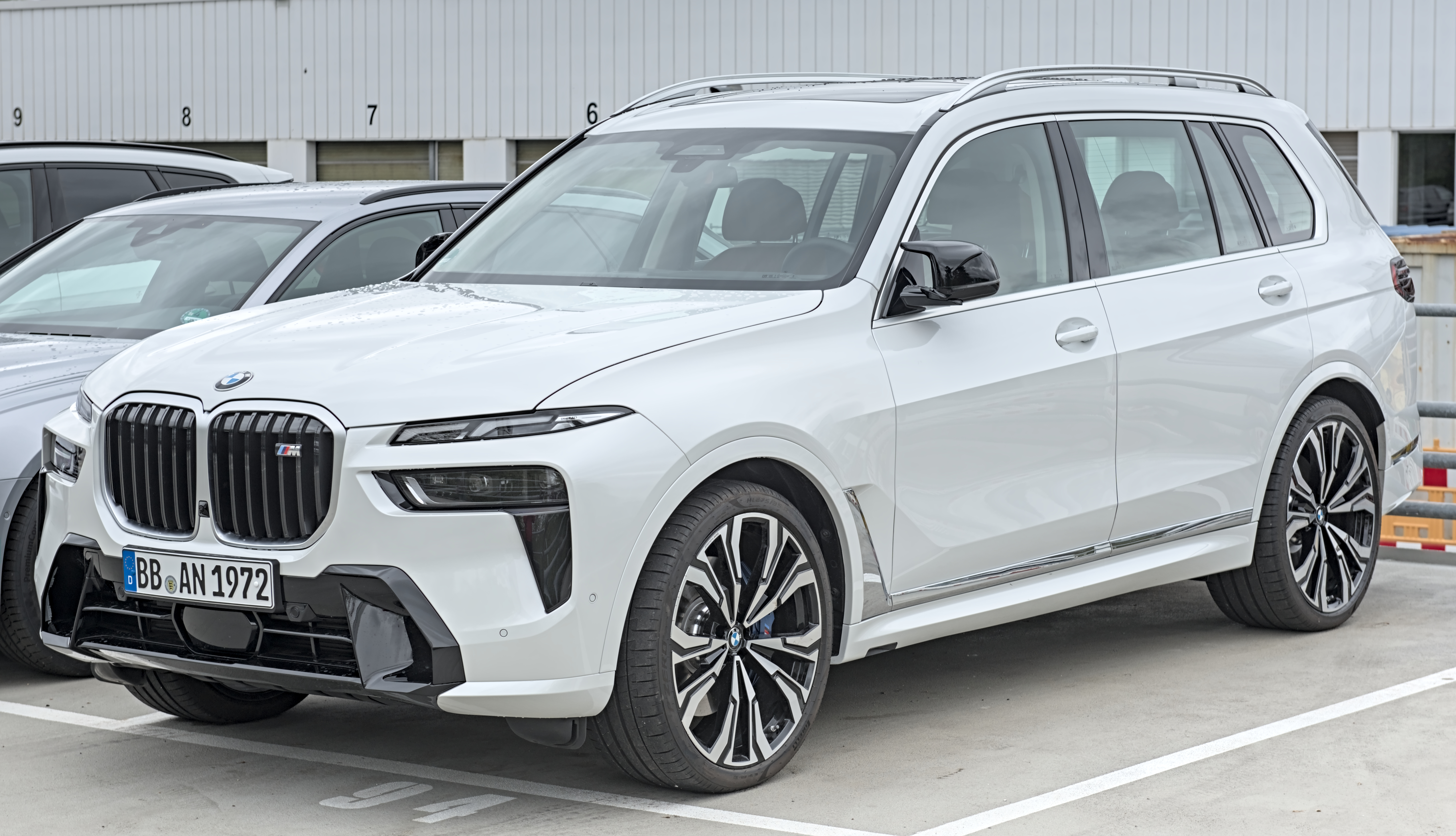
2022 BMW X7 M60i xDrive

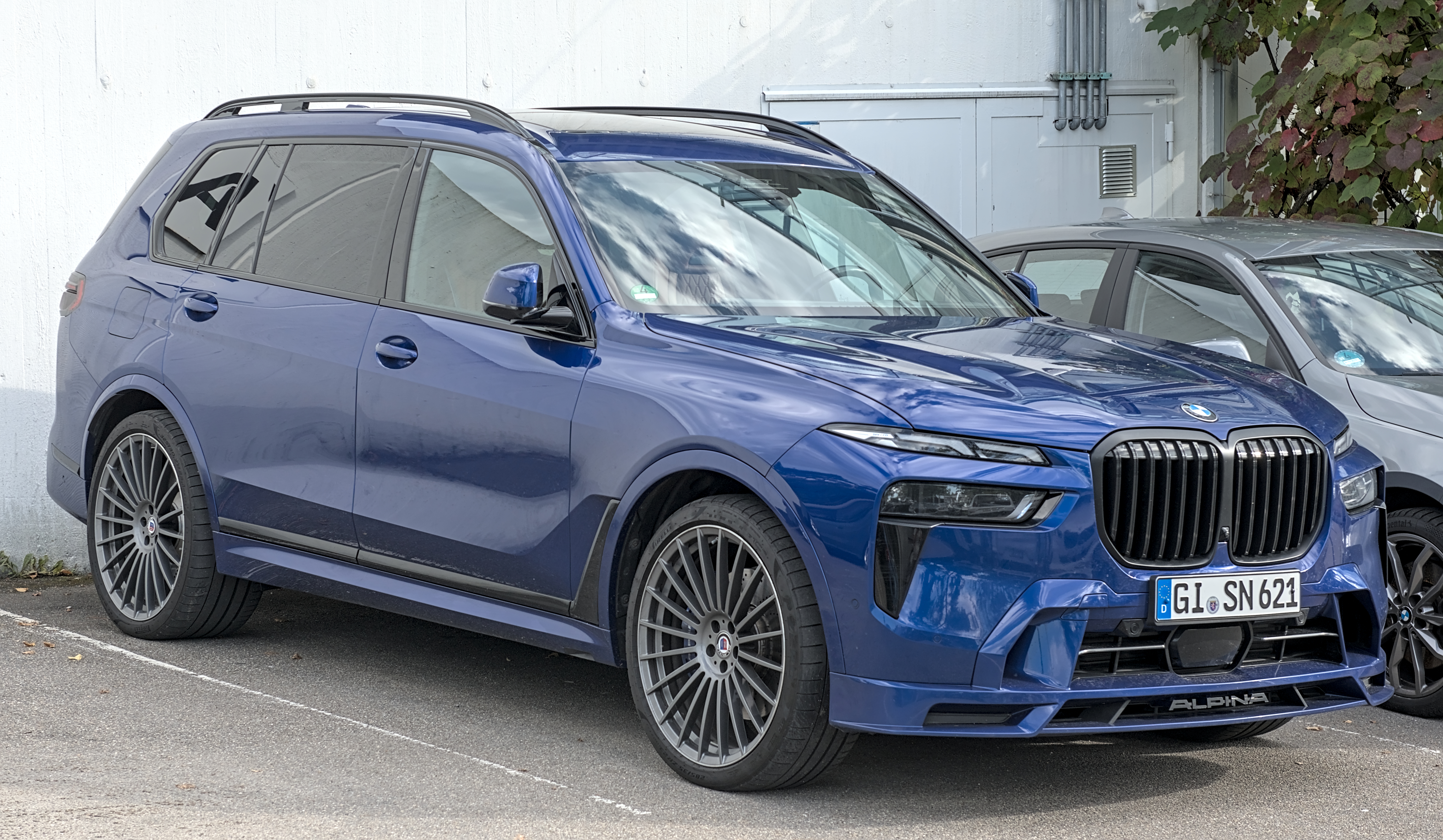
Alpina XB7 (facelift)

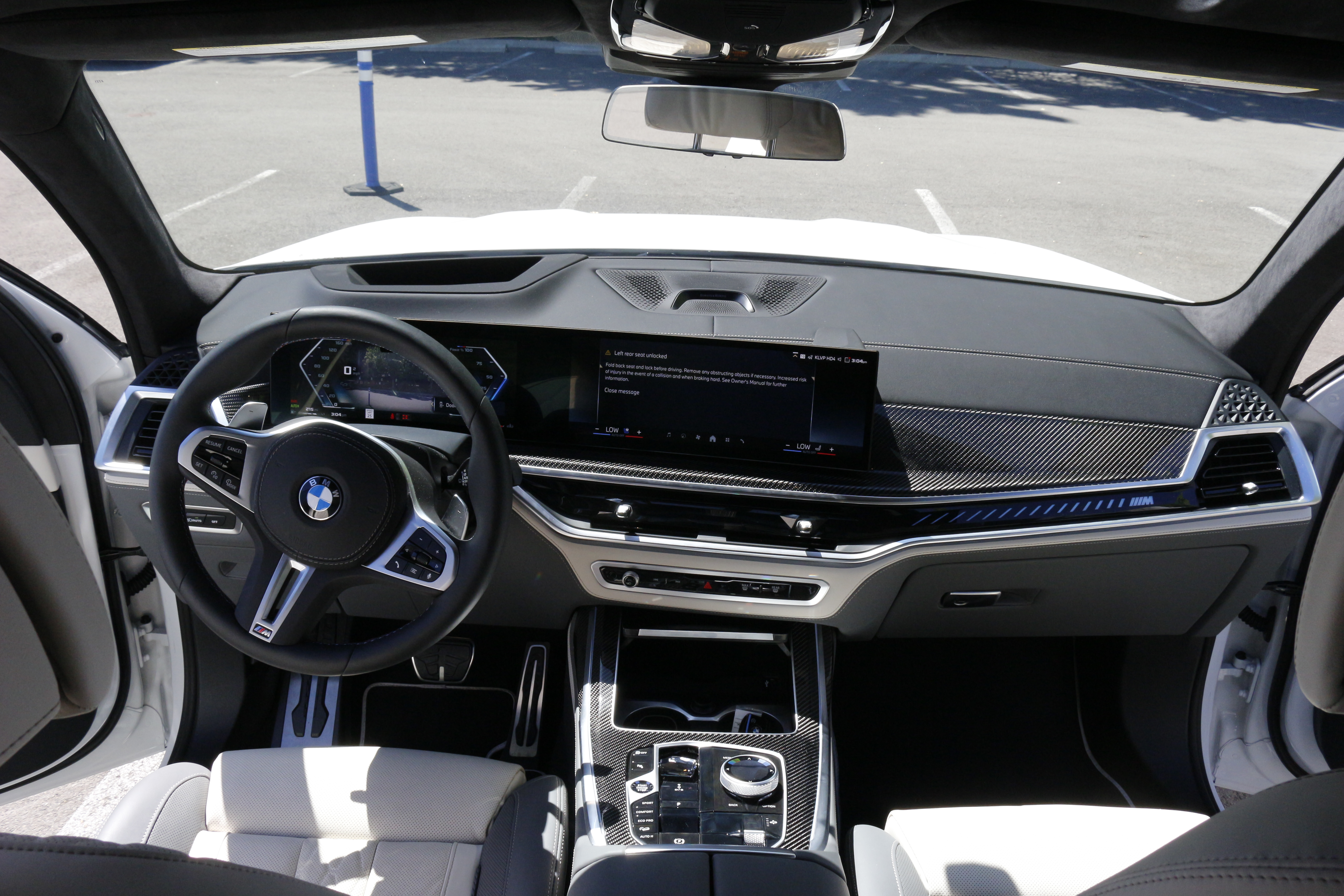
Interior (facelift)

== Equipment ==
The G07 X7 is available in Design Pure Excellence, Sport and M Sport trims.

Standard equipment includes Vernasca leather, four-zone climate control, iDrive 7.0, Adaptive LED headlights, wireless charging, and electrically adjustable and heated three row seating. The middle row features three seats with a two-seat configuration also available. The X7 also receives driver assistance systems including autonomous cruise control and collision detection with braking intervention. Other options include cooled and heated cup holders, a panoramic sunroof with LED light patterns, and laser headlights. An off-road package adds selectable off-road driving modes and adjusts the ride height, acceleration and transmission response, and traction control system.

The instrument cluster features a camera to ensure the driver is paying attention to the road while autonomous functions are active, and allows the driver to take their hands off the steering wheel for up to one minute. Additionally it has an optional heads up display that shows a clear map with navigation instructions, in addition to speed.

30-40 models with the M Sport trim and M50 models can be fitted with M Performance Parts. These include carbon fibre mirrors, a sport steering wheel, floor mats and steel pedals.

== Models ==
=== Petrol engines ===
Model	Years	Engine- turbo	Power	Torque	0–100 km/h (0–62 mph)
xDrive40i	2018–2022	3.0 L B58 straight-6	250 kW (335 hp) at 5,500–6,500 rpm	450 N⋅m (332 lb⋅ft) at 1,500–5,200 rpm	5.8 s
xDrive40i	2023–	3.0 L B58 straight-6	280 kW (375 hp) at 5,500–6,500 rpm	520 N⋅m (384 lb⋅ft) at 1,500–5,200 rpm	5.6 s
xDrive50i	2019–2020	4.4 L N63; V8	340 kW (456 hp) at 5,250–6,000 rpm	650 N⋅m (479 lb⋅ft) at 1,500–4,750 rpm	5.4 s
M50i	2020–2022	4.4 L N63; V8	390 kW (523 hp) at 5,500–6,000 rpm	750 N⋅m (553 lb⋅ft) at 1,800–4,600 rpm	4.5 s
M60i	2023–	4.4 L S68; V8	390 kW (523 hp) at 5,500–6,000 rpm	750 N⋅m (553 lb⋅ft) at 1,800–4,600 rpm	4.7 s
Alpina XB7	2020–2022	4.4 L N63; V8	457 kW (613 hp) at 5500–6600 rpm	800 N⋅m (590 lb⋅ft) at 2,000–5,000 rpm	4.2 s
Alpina XB7	2023–2026	4.4 L S68; V8	471 kW (632 hp) at 5,600–6,500 rpm	800 N⋅m (590 lb⋅ft) at 1,800–5,600 rpm	4.0 s

=== Diesel engines ===
Model	Years	Engine- turbo	Power	Torque	0–100 km/h (0–62 mph)
xDrive30d	2018–2020	3.0 L B57 straight-6	195 kW (261 hp) at 4000 rpm	620 N⋅m (457 lb⋅ft) at 2000–2500 rpm	7.0 s
xDrive40d	2020–2022	3.0 L B57 straight-6	250 kW (335 hp) at 4400 rpm	700 N⋅m (516 lb⋅ft) at 1750–2250 rpm	6.1 s
xDrive40d	2023-	3.0 L B57 straight-6	259 kW (347 hp) at 4400 rpm	720 N⋅m (531 lb⋅ft) at 1750–2250 rpm	5.9 s
M50d	2018–2020	3.0 L B57 straight-6	294 kW (394 hp) at 4400 rpm	760 N⋅m (561 lb⋅ft) at 2000–3000 rpm	5.4 s

=== Electric ===
During 2025 Q1 financial results call, BMW confirmed that electric X7, named iX7, will be coming to the market. Preliminary introduction date is year 2027-2028. The iX7 will be manufactured in BMW's Spartanburg plant in the USA.

== Production ==
In March 2025, Avtotor resumed assembly of the X5, X6, and X7 models using remaining component kits left over after BMW terminated its partnership with the company in 2022 following Russia's invasion of Ukraine. BMW stated that it was not involved in the production, explaining that Avtotor was assembling limited batches of vehicles from "old, partially outdated kits" that had remained in its possession after the partnership ended, with production taking place on an irregular basis.

Avtotor sold a total of 145 vehicles in 2025. Although these vehicles were registered as 2025 and 2026 model-year vehicles, they retained the exterior design of the pre-facelift 2022 models. As supplies of imported components diminished, assembly increasingly incorporated locally sourced parts, including wiring harnesses, hoses, rubber components, and painted body panels.

== Sales ==
Year	China	Indonesia
2019		17
2020		91
2021		90
2022		139
2023	10,997	115
2024	7,331	105
2025	4,362	139

== See also ==
- List of BMW vehicles
