= BMW Manufacturing (Thailand) =

BMW Manufacturing (Thailand) Co., Ltd.
- Company type: Subsididary
- Founded: 1998; 28 years ago
- Headquarters: Rayong, Thailand
- Products: Automobiles, engines, motorcycles

BMW Manufacturing (Thailand) Co., Ltd. is an automobile manufacturing company based Rayong, in the Rayong Province of eastern Thailand and a subsidiary of BMW Group Thailand.

== History ==
The BMW Group Thailand was founded in 1998 as a subsidiary of BMW AG and consists of three companies: BMW (Thailand) Co., Ltd. for Sales, BMW Manufacturing (Thailand) Co., Ltd. for the production and BMW Leasing (Thailand) Co., Ltd. for financial services.

The work was started in May 2000 with the production of BMW 3 Series. In October 2002, the long version of the 7 Series was added. A little later, production of the 5 Series started in April 2004. In 2005, the 3 Series was then replaced by the fifth generation. In January 2006, the BMW X3 was joined by the fourth model. There were new generation changes in January 2010 in the 5 Series as in August of the same year in the 7 Series. In the same year, the X1 was introduced as the 5th model in Thailand. A year later, the X3 followed.

== Current models ==
=== Assembled locally ===
- BMW 2 Series Gran Coupé (2020–present)
- BMW 3 Series (2012–present)
- BMW 5 Series (2010–present)
- BMW 7 Series (2001–present)
- BMW X1 (2009–present)
- BMW X3 (2003–present)
- BMW X5 (2020–present)
- BMW X6 (2022–present)
- BMW X7 (2021–present)
