= F85 =

F85 or F-85 may refer to:

- BMW X5 (F85), mid-size luxury SUV based on the BMW X5 (F15)
- Durango F-85, an early personal computer
- HMS Cumberland (F85), Batch 3 Type 22 frigate of the British Royal Navy
- HMS Jupiter (F85), J-class destroyer of the Royal Navy
- HMS Keppel (F85), anti-submarine frigate built for the Royal Navy in the 1950s
- HMS Montclare (F85), passenger ship built for the Canadian Pacific Steamship Company, Montreal
- Navarra (F85), a Spanish-built Santa Maria-class frigate of the Spanish Navy
- McDonnell XF-85 Goblin, an American experimental fighter aircraft
- Oldsmobile F-85, an American automobile
- Spanish frigate Navarra (F85), a Santa Maria-class frigate
- Volvo F85, a medium size truck
