= Alpina B5 (G30) =

BMW 5 series variant manufactured by Alpina

Alpina B5 and D5 (G30)
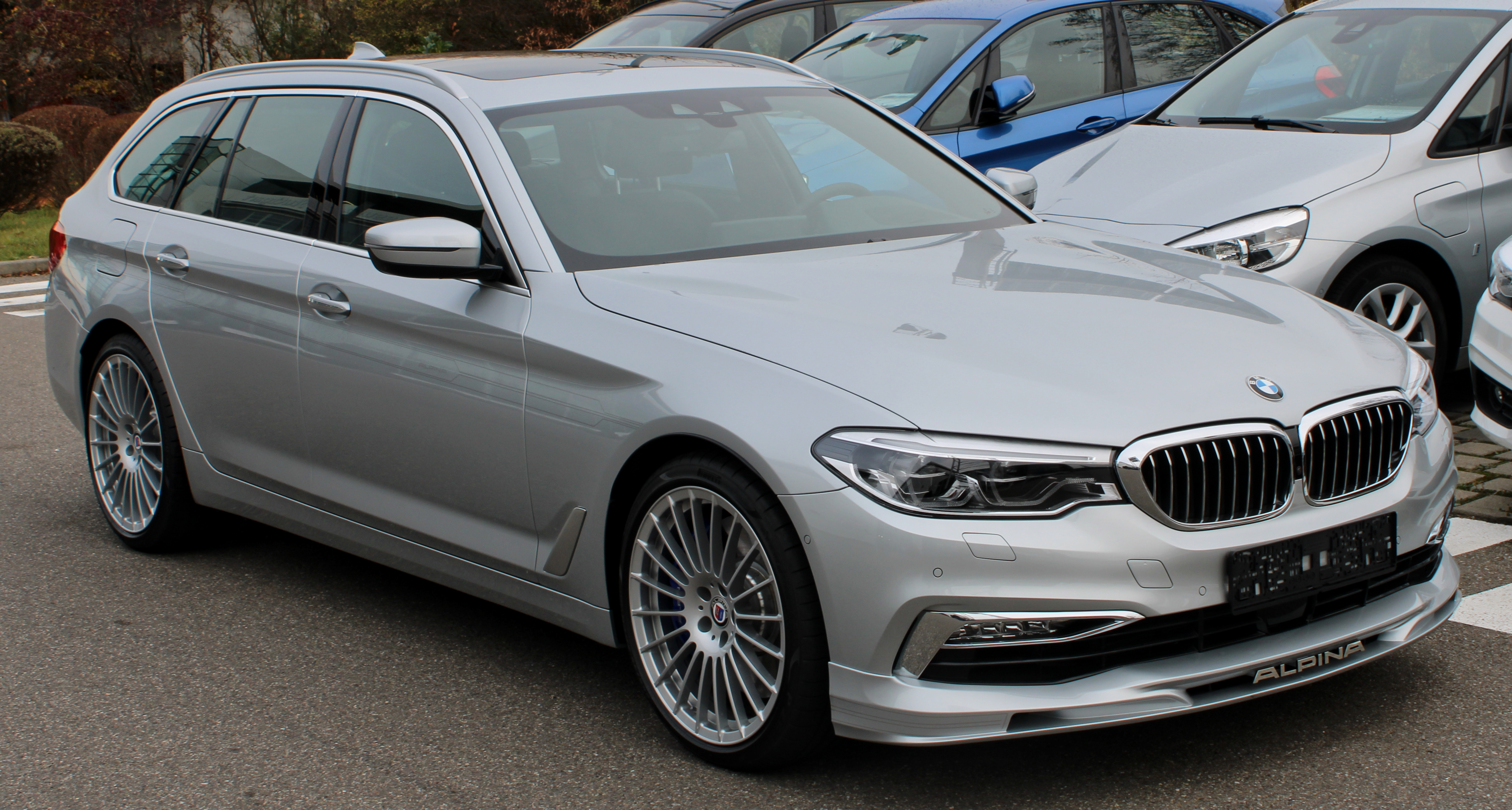
- Alpina B5 'Touring' (wagon)

Overview
- Manufacturer: Alpina Burkard Bovensiepen GmbH & Co. KG
- Also called: Alpina B5 Bi-Turbo
- Production: 2017–2024
- Assembly: Germany: Buchloe

Body and chassis
- Class: Executive car (E)
- Body style: 4-door saloon (G30); 5-door station wagon (G31)
- Layout: Front-engine, all-wheel-drive (xDrive)
- Related: BMW 5 Series (G30)

Powertrain
- Engine: Petrol 4.4 L BMW N63 twin-turbocharged V8; Diesel 3.0 L BMW B57 turbodiesel I6
- Transmission: 8-speed ZF 8HP automatic

Dimensions
- Wheelbase: 2,975 mm (117.1 in)
- Length: 4,956 mm (195.1 in)
- Width: 1,868 mm (73.5 in)
- Height: 1,466 mm (57.7 in)
- Kerb weight: Saloon: 2,015 kg (4,442 lb); Wagon: 2,120 kg (4,674 lb)

Chronology
- Predecessor: Alpina B5 (F10)

The Alpina B5 and D5 (G30) are a series of high performance executive cars manufactured by German Automobile manufacturer Alpina. Introduced at the 2017 Geneva Motor Show, the car is the third generation of the B5 and succeeds the Alpina B5 (F10). Based on the BMW 5 Series (G30), the car is available in both saloon and wagon bodystyles.

== Overview ==
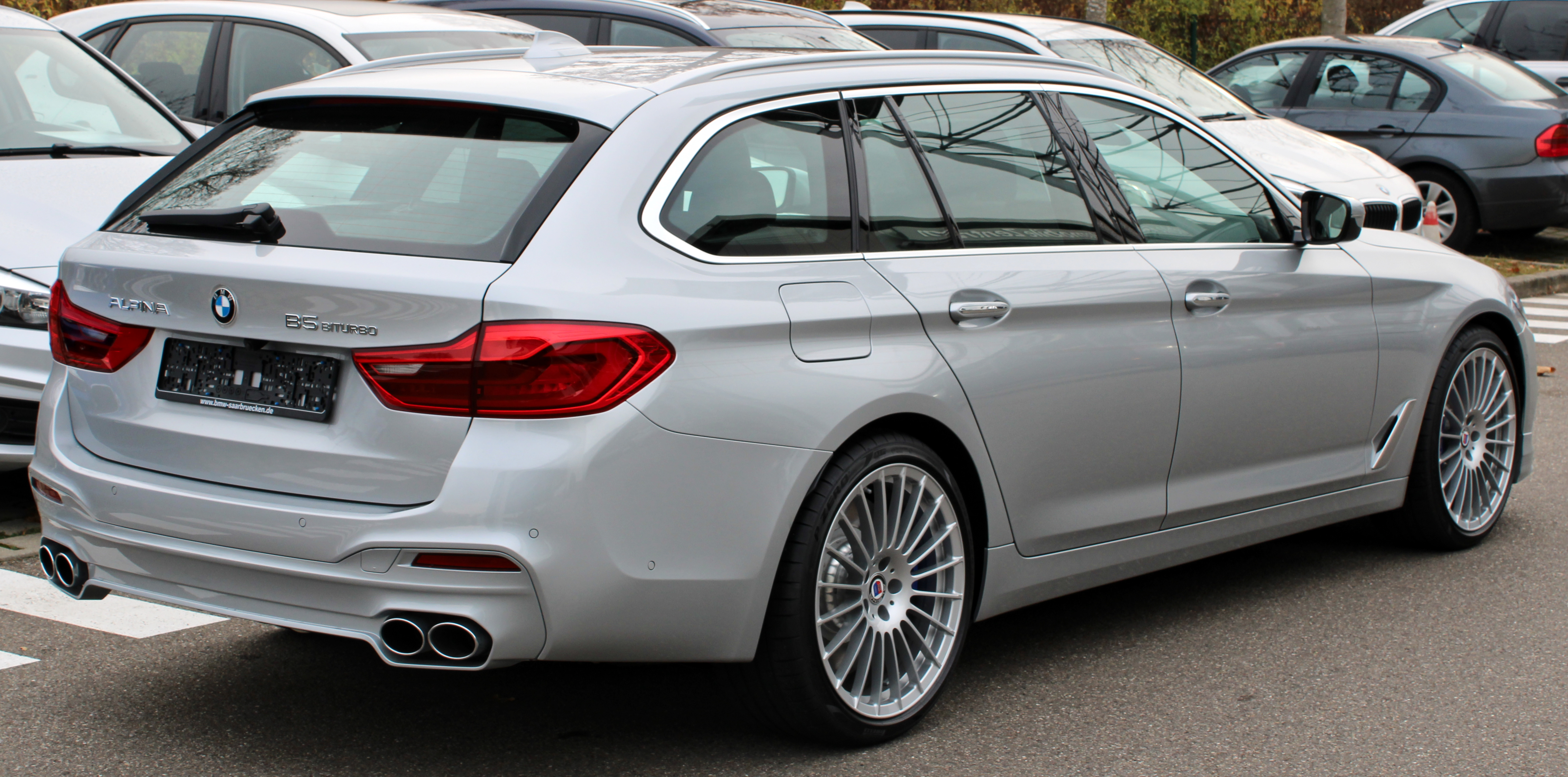
Rear view (B5 Touring)

The B5 is based on the 540i X-Drive, and uses a modified 4.4-litre N63 twin-turbocharged V8 called the N63TU2. Modifications include a re-designed air intake, cooling system, higher compression Mahle pistons, twin-scroll Garrett turbos, a larger intercooler, new NGK spark plugs and revised ECU map. A lighter exhaust system also reduces back pressure. This allows a higher power output of 447 kW (608 PS; 599 hp) and 800 N⋅m (590 lb⋅ft) of torque. Due to the higher torque output, the 8-speed automatic transmission, manufactured by ZF, uses stronger internals. Alpina TCU mapping allows quicker shift times and launch control. The transmission allows 100 launches before disabling the feature to preserve reliability.

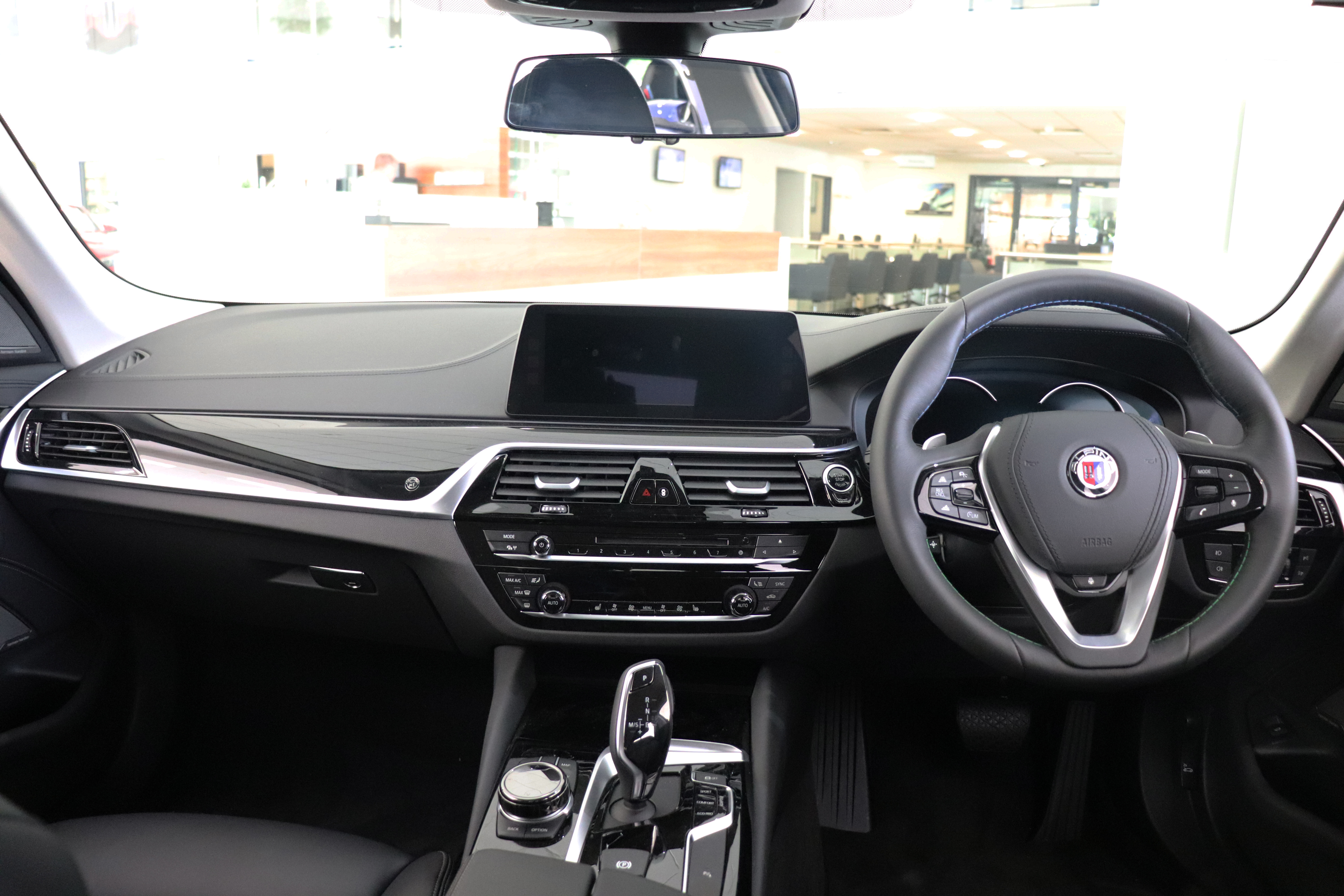
Interior

The B5 is fitted with M style control arms, with added camber and stiffer bushings to reduce understeer and enhance precision. Revised Eibach springs and Bilstein dampers allow better body control, and a new "Comfort" damper mode allows a smoother ride. The Touring version uses rear air springs to maintain a stable ride height. Options include a limited slip differential by Drexler, and higher performance composite brakes.

The car is fitted with 20-inch forged Alpina style alloy wheels, claimed to save 3 kg (7 lb) of weight, wrapped in Pirelli P Zero tyres developed specifically for this car. BMW's xDrive all wheel drive system is used, which can divert up to 90 per cent of the torque to the rear wheels. This is the first generation of the B5 to be offered only with xDrive. The active roll stabilisation and four wheel steering from the M550i have been recalibrated.

Interior changes include higher quality Lavalina leather, wood trim, blue Alpina gauges and BMW Comfort seats. A numbered build number plaque is located just behind the iDrive rotary control. The interior options are customised according to the individual.

Exterior changes include an Alpina style front lip spoiler, rear lip spoiler, a windshield spoiler and optional decal pinstripes.

The B5 can accelerate from 0–100 km/h (62 mph) in 3.5 seconds (Touring 3.6), 0–200 km/h (124 mph) in 11.4 seconds and has a top speed of 330 km/h (205 mph) (325 km/h (202 mph) for the Touring version).

== Variants ==
=== D5 S ===
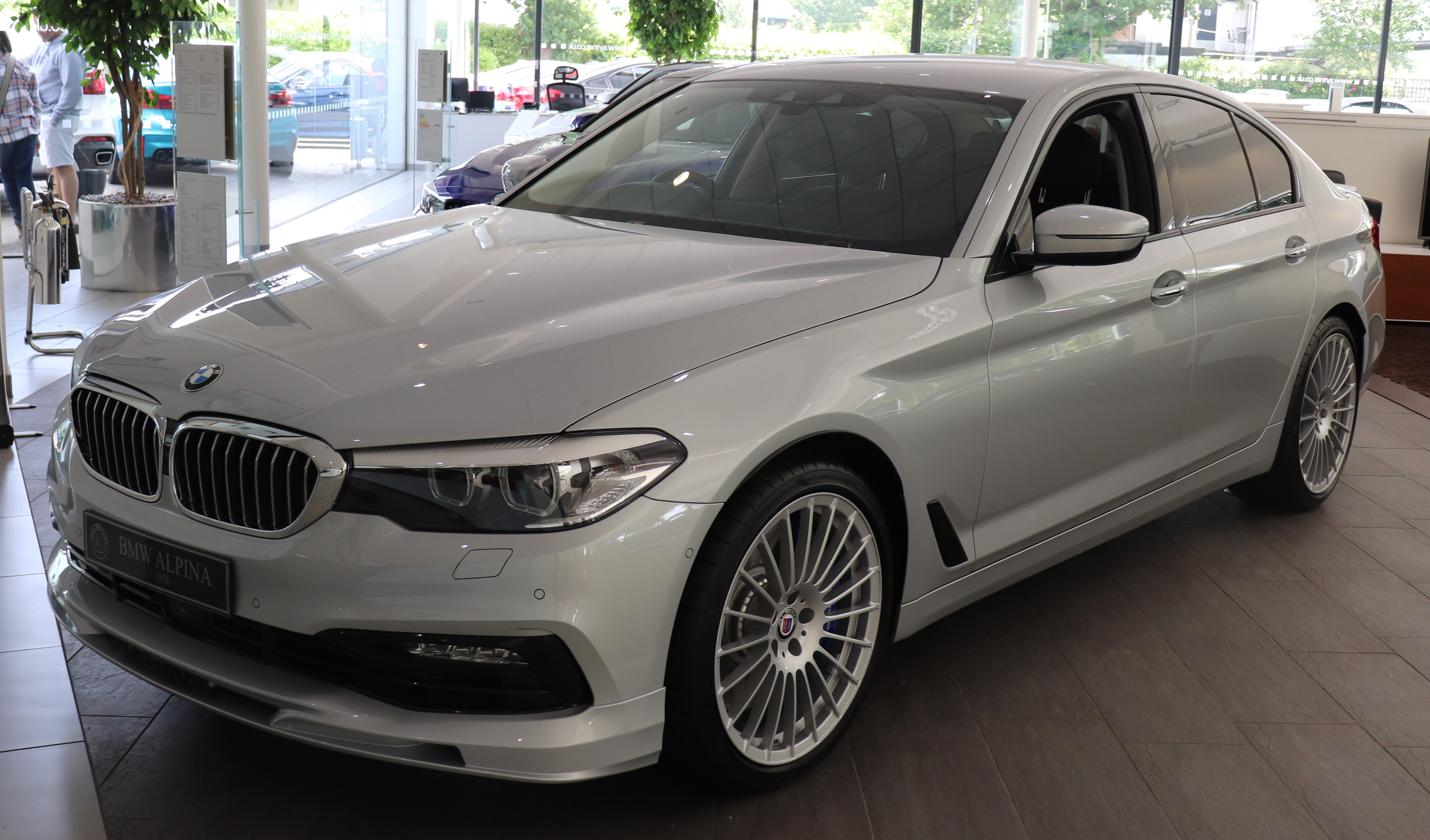
Alpina D5 S (saloon)

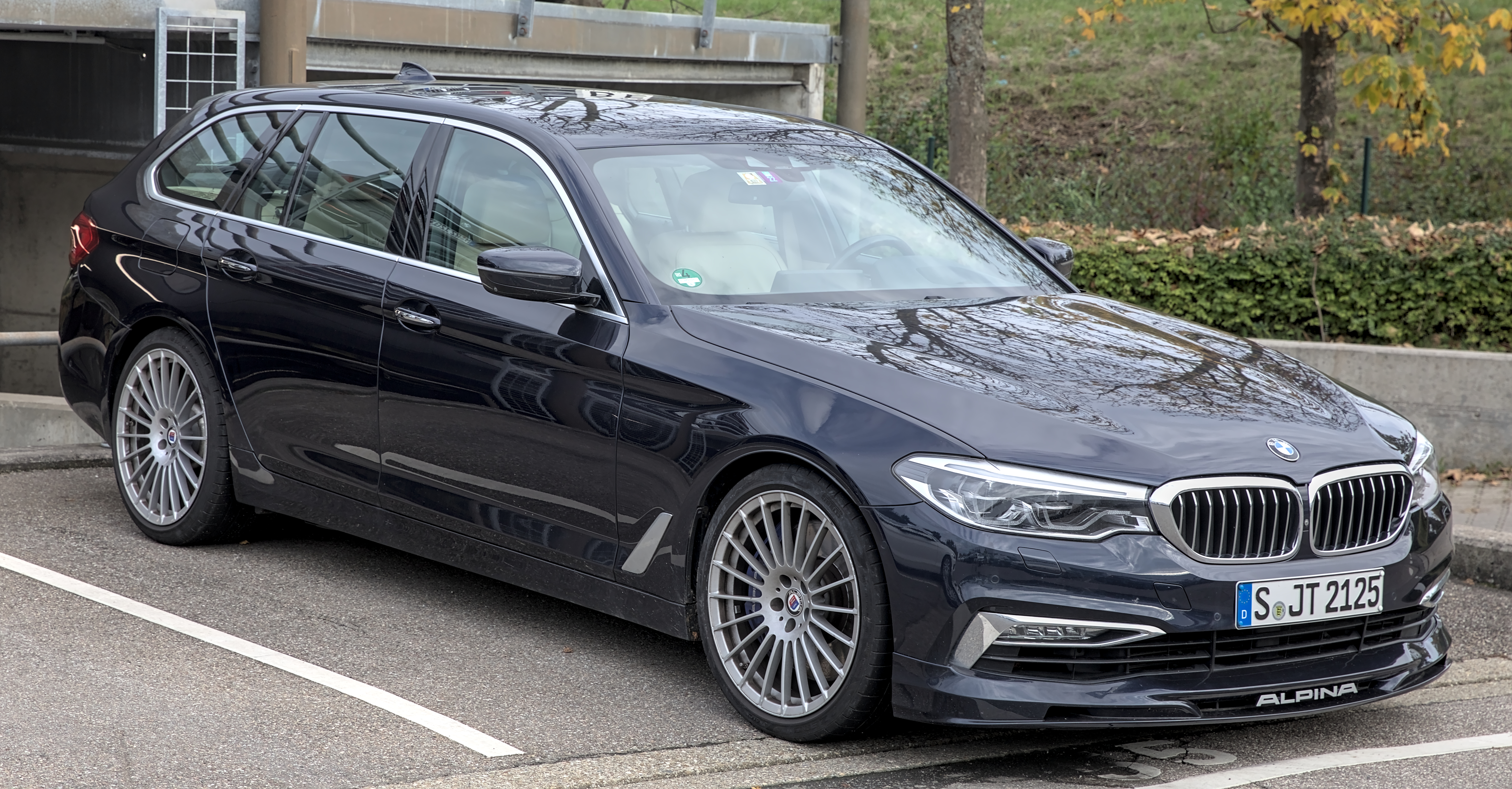
Alpina D5 S 'Touring' (wagon)

Unveiled at the 2017 Frankfurt Auto Show, the D5 S is the diesel engine variant of the B5. Based on the BMW 540d xDrive, the modified BMW B57 straight-6 engine tri-turbo features one low pressure and two high pressure turbochargers. This is exclusive to left hand drive cars, as the right hand drive cars use a twin-turbo with lower performance. The tri-turbo is rated at 282 kW (383 PS; 378 hp) and 800 N⋅m (590 lb⋅ft) of torque, while the twin-turbo is rated at 240 kW (326 PS; 322 hp) and 700 N⋅m (516 lb⋅ft) of torque. The Touring body style is also not offered in right hand drive. Other modifications remain the same as the B5. Performance figures are 0–100 km/h (62 mph) in 4.4 seconds (Touring tri-turbo 4.6 and the twin turbo 4.9). Top speed is 286 km/h (178 mph), (283 km/h (176 mph) for the tri-turbo Touring, and 275 km/h (171 mph) for the twin-turbo).
