= ZF 8HP transmission =

8-speed automatic from 2008

ZF 8HP
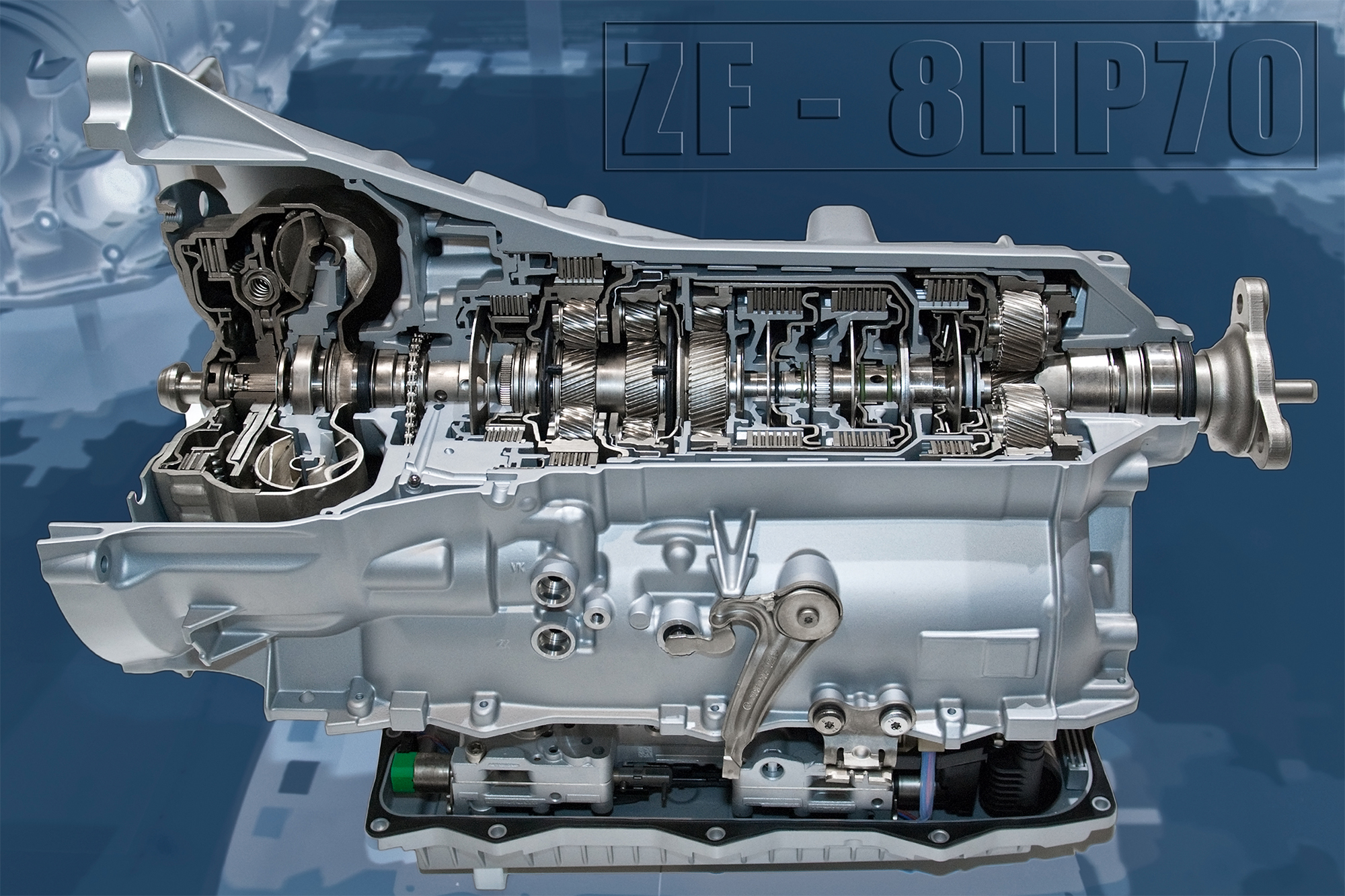
- Automatic Transmission 8HP 70

Overview
- Manufacturer: ZF Friedrichshafen
- Production: 2008–present

Body and chassis
- Class: 8-speed longitudinal automatic transmission
- Related: GM 8L · Aisin-Toyota 8-speed · MB 9G-Tronic · ZF 9HP

Chronology
- Predecessor: ZF 6HP

8HP is ZF Friedrichshafen AG's trademark name for its 8-speed automatic transmission models with hydraulic converter and planetary gearsets for longitudinal engine applications. The 8HP is the first transmission to use this 8-speed gearset concept. Thanks to its economical design, consisting of only 9 components, it became established as the standard version of an automatic transmission with a torque converter. The uneven distribution of the gears apparently posed no problem.

The 8HP is not the world's first 8-speed automatic transmission. That distinction belongs to Toyota's AA 80E, which was introduced in 2006 and features a completely different gearset design.

The GM 8L transmission is based on the same globally patented gearset concept and was introduced in 2014. While fully retaining the gearset logic, it differs from this only in the patented arrangement of the components with gearsets 1 and 3 swapped.

== Key data ==
Gear ratios (Note: Differences in gear ratios have a measurable, direct impact on vehicle dynamics, performance, waste emissions as well as fuel mileage)
Model	Gear									Total Span			Avg. Step	Components		Nomenclature			
Model	R	1	2	3	4	5	6	7	8	Nomi- nal	Effec- tive	Cen- ter	Avg. Step	Total	per Gear (Note: Forward gears only)	Gears Count	Cou- pling	Gear- sets	Maximum Input Torque
2008: Pilot series (Note: without generation designation)														4 Gearsets; 2 Brakes; 3 Clutches	1.125	8	H (Note: Hydraulic torque converter · German: Hydraulischer Wandler oder Drehmomentwandler)	P (Note: Planetary gearing · German: Planetenradsätze)	2008
8HP 70	−3.297	4.696	3.130	2.104	1.667	1.285	1.000	0.839	0.667	7.043	4.945	1.769	1.322	4 Gearsets; 2 Brakes; 3 Clutches	1.125	8	H	P	700 N⋅m (516 lb⋅ft)
2010: 1st generation														4 Gearsets; 2 Brakes; 3 Clutches	1.125	8	H	P	2010
8HP 30/I · 8HP 45	−3.295	4.714	3.143	2.106	1.667	1.285	1.000	0.839	0.667	7.071	4.943	1.773	1.322	4 Gearsets; 2 Brakes; 3 Clutches	1.125	8	H	P	300 N⋅m (221 lb⋅ft) · 450 N⋅m (332 lb⋅ft)
8HP 55 · 8HP 70 8HP 65 · 8HP 90	−3.317	4.714	3.143	2.106	1.667	1.285	1.000	0.839	0.667	7.071	4.975	1.773	1.322	4 Gearsets; 2 Brakes; 3 Clutches	1.125	8	H	P	650 N⋅m (479 lb⋅ft) · 650 N⋅m (479 lb⋅ft); 700 N⋅m (516 lb⋅ft) · 900 N⋅m (664 lb⋅ft)
2014: 2nd generation														4 Gearsets; 2 Brakes; 3 Clutches	1.125	8	H	P	2014
8HP 75/I	−3.317	4.714	3.143	2.106	1.667	1.285	1.000	0.839	0.667	7.071	4.975	1.773	1.322	4 Gearsets; 2 Brakes; 3 Clutches	1.125	8	H	P	740 N⋅m (546 lb⋅ft)
8HP 30/II · 8HP 50	−3.456	5.000	3.200	2.143	1.720	1.314	1.000	0.822	0.640	7.813	5.400	1.789	1.341	4 Gearsets; 2 Brakes; 3 Clutches	1.125	8	H	P	300 N⋅m (221 lb⋅ft) · 500 N⋅m (369 lb⋅ft)
8HP 75/II · 8HP 95	−3.478	5.000	3.200	2.143	1.720	1.313	1.000	0.823	0.640	7.813	5.435	1.789	1.341	4 Gearsets; 2 Brakes; 3 Clutches	1.125	8	H	P	740 N⋅m (546 lb⋅ft) · 900 N⋅m (664 lb⋅ft)
2018: 3rd generation														4 Gearsets; 2 Brakes; 3 Clutches	1.125	8	H	P	2018
8HP 76/I	−3.478	5.000	3.200	2.143	1.720	1.313	1.000	0.823	0.640	7.813	5.435	1.789	1.341	4 Gearsets; 2 Brakes; 3 Clutches	1.125	8	H	P	760 N⋅m (561 lb⋅ft)
8HP 30/III · 8HP 51	−3.712	5.250	3.360	2.172	1.720	1.316	1.000	0.822	0.640	8.203	5.800	1.833	1.351	4 Gearsets; 2 Brakes; 3 Clutches	1.125	8	H	P	300 N⋅m (221 lb⋅ft) · 500 N⋅m (369 lb⋅ft)
8HP 76/II	−3.993	5.500	3.520	2.200	1.720	1.317	1.000	0.823	0.640	8.594	6.239	1.876	1.360	4 Gearsets; 2 Brakes; 3 Clutches	1.125	8	H	P	760 N⋅m (561 lb⋅ft)
2022: 4th generation														4 Gearsets; 2 Brakes; 3 Clutches	1.125	8	H	P	2022
8HP 100	−3.968	5.000	3.200	2.143	1.720	1.297	1.000	0.833	0.640	7.813	6.200	1.789	1.341	4 Gearsets; 2 Brakes; 3 Clutches	1.125	8	H	P	1,000 N⋅m (738 lb⋅ft)
8HP 80	−4.544	5.500	3.520	2.200	1.720	1.301	1.000	0.833	0.640	8.594	7.100	1.876	1.360	4 Gearsets; 2 Brakes; 3 Clutches	1.125	8	H	P	800 N⋅m (590 lb⋅ft)
2016: Racing cars														4 Gearsets; 2 Brakes; 3 Clutches	1.125	8	2016		
8P 45R	TBD	TBD	TBD	TBD	TBD	TBD	1.000	TBD	TBD	4.200	TBD	TBD	1.228	4 Gearsets; 2 Brakes; 3 Clutches	1.125	8	—	P	450 N⋅m (332 lb⋅ft) – 1,050 N⋅m (774 lb⋅ft)
2017: Commercial vehicles														4 Gearsets; 2 Brakes; 3 Clutches	1.125	8	2017		
8AP 600 T · 8AP 1000 T 8AP 800 T · 8AP 1200 T	−4.250	4.889	3.123	2.033	1.639	1.254	1.000	0.840	0.639	7.652	6.652	1.767	1.337	4 Gearsets; 2 Brakes; 3 Clutches	1.125	8	A (Note: Automatic)	P (Note: Powershift)	600 N⋅m (443 lb⋅ft) – 800 N⋅m (590 lb⋅ft); 1,000 N⋅m (738 lb⋅ft) – 1,200 N⋅m (885 lb⋅ft) (Note: higher torque on demand)
8AP 1200 S	−3.757	4.889	3.123	2.033	1.639	1.268	1.000	0.830	0.639	7.652	5.880	1.767	1.337	4 Gearsets; 2 Brakes; 3 Clutches	1.125	8	A	P	1,200 N⋅m (885 lb⋅ft)

== History ==
Designed and first built by ZF's subsidiary in Saarbrücken, Germany, it first was introduced in 2008 on the BMW 7 Series (F01) 760Li sedan fitted with the V12 engine. BMW remains a major customer for the transmission. It is now in its fourth generation and has been adopted by more than 20 brands from BMW to Ram; by 2023 over 15 million units have been produced.

Another major customer is Stellantis, who both received a license to produce the transmission and set up a joint-venture plant with ZF. Stellantis has built the transmission at its Kokomo Transmission plant since 2013 under their own brand name, the Torqueflite 8. The joint venture plant in Gray Court, South Carolina opened in 2012.

== Specifications ==
=== 2008: Pilot series ===
The 8HP 70 transmission with the gearset 4 in 23-85-teeth-configuration was the pilot series and therefore without generation designation. It was first used in the BMW 7 Series (F01) 760Li, has a torque handling limit of 700 N⋅m (516 lb⋅ft), and weighs 87 kg (192 lb).

=== 2010: 1st generation ===
In addition to the rear-wheel drive variant, two different four-wheel drive versions were available, with a version destined for Volkswagen Group applications using a Torsen centre differential. It is able to encompass a torque range from 300 N⋅m (221 lb⋅ft) to 1,000 N⋅m (738 lb⋅ft), and is available for use in middle-class cars through to large luxury sport utility vehicles.

Since gearset 4 meshes in almost all gears up to and including 5th gear, large gear wheels are advantageous for durability. As the very high ratio 1st gear is formed exclusively by gearset 4, its sun gear is unusually small. For this reason, this gearset was enlarged by over 20% when the 1st generation was introduced, even if this advantage had to be given up again immediately when the 2nd generation was introduced in order to increase the total span.

=== 2014: 2nd generation ===
Efficiency improvements over the pilot design and the first generation include a wider ratio span of 7.81, reduced drag torque from the shift elements, reduction in required oil pump pressure, and broadened use of the coasting and start-stop systems. ZF estimated fuel economy improvement over first generation to be 3%. Refinements were also made with respect to vibration.

=== 2018: 3rd generation ===
Major improvements are total span of 8.59 and a fuel economy improvement of 2.5% compared to the second generation. There are several options in maximum torque available, also the gearbox is available with mild hybrid and plug in hybrid options: With 15 kW (20 hp) and 200 N⋅m (148 lb⋅ft) supporting boosting and recuperation in combination with 48 Volt technology up to 90 kW (121 hp) and 250 N⋅m (184 lb⋅ft) for usage with higher voltage.

=== 2022: 4th generation ===
Major improvement is the transition to a versatile modular system that allows vehicle manufacturers to comprehensively and flexibly electrify their models as required. Plug-in Hybrid options with up to 160 kW (215 hp) and 280 N⋅m (207 lb⋅ft) are capable of saving up to 70% of carbon emissions compared with a purely conventional variant of the 8HP according to the Worldwide Harmonised Light Vehicles Test Procedure (WLTP). In addition, a modification to gearset 3 increased the reverse gear ratio, making it less disadvantageous. With this gearset concept, the already disadvantageously large step from 7th to 8th gear is further increased, albeit only slightly.

=== 2016: racing cars ===
The 8P 45R transfers the characteristics of the transmission for volume production passenger cars to racing applications. The racing transmission and the volume production version share 85 % of all components including gearset 3. Total span is 4.2 to suit racing cars. The torque converter is replaced by a wet clutch. This saves weight and optimises the response to the accelerator pedal input. It is a computer-controlled double-clutching.

=== 2017/2020: commercial vehicles ===
The 8AP transmission brings the shifting quality of premium passenger cars to the medium-duty truck, bus and heavy-duty pickup truck segments. This makes it easy to integrate an electric motor with an output of well over 100 kW. Volume production started 2020.

== Planetary gearset concept ==
=== Improved fuel economy ===
The main objective in replacing the predecessor model was to improve vehicle fuel economy with extra speeds and a wider gear span to allow the engine speed level to be lowered (downspeeding), which is a decisive factor in improving energy efficiency and thus reducing fuel consumption. In addition, the lower engine speed level improves the noise-vibration-harshness comfort and the exterior noise is reduced. Compared to the 6-speed ZF 6HP transmission it uses 12% less fuel, and 14% less than a 5-speed transmission. Due to changes in internal design, the shift times have reduced to 0.2 seconds.

=== Reduced manufacturing complexity ===
In order to avoid a further increase in manufacturing complexity while expanding the number of gear ratios, ZF switched from the conventional design method—in which the planetary gearset concept was limited to a purely serial or in-line power flow—to a more modern design method that utilizes a planetary gearset concept with combined parallel and serial power flow. This was only possible thanks to computer-aided design and has resulted in a globally patented gearset concept. The resulting progress is reflected in a better ratio of the number of gears to the number of components used compared to existing layouts. The 8HP has become the new reference standard (benchmark) for automatic transmissions.

Planetary gearset concept: manufacturing complexity (Note: Progress increases cost-effectiveness and is reflected in the ratio of forward gears to main components. It depends on the power flow: parallel: using the two degrees of freedom of planetary gearsets; to increase the number of gears; with unchanged number of components; serial: in-line combined planetary gearsets without using the two degrees of freedom; to increase the number of gears; a corresponding increase in the number of components is unavoidable)
With Assessment	Output: Gear Ratios	Innovation Elasticity (Note: Innovation elasticity classifies progress and market position: Automobile manufacturers drive forward technical developments primarily in order to remain competitive or to achieve or defend technological leadership. This technical progress has therefore always been subject to economic constraints; Only innovations whose relative additional benefit is greater than the relative additional resource input, i.e. whose economic elasticity is greater than 1, are considered for realization; The required innovation elasticity of an automobile manufacturer depends on its expected return on investment. The basic assumption that the relative additional benefit must be at least twice as high as the relative additional resource input helps with orientation; negative, if the output increases and the input decreases, is perfect; 2 or above is good; 1 or above is acceptable (red); below this is unsatisfactory (bold)) Δ Output : Δ Input	Input: Main Components			
With Assessment	Output: Gear Ratios	Innovation Elasticity Δ Output : Δ Input	Total	Gearsets	Brakes	Clutches
8HP Ref. Object	$n_{O1}$ $n_{O2}$	Topic	$n_I= n_G+$ $n_B+ n_C$	$n_{G1}$ $n_{G2}$	$n_{B1}$ $n_{B2}$	$n_{C1}$ $n_{C2}$
Δ Number	$n_{O1}- n_{O2}$	Topic	$n_{I1}- n_{I2}$	$n_{G1}- n_{G2}$	$n_{B1}- n_{B2}$	$n_{C1}- n_{C2}$
Relative Δ	Δ Output $\tfrac{n_{O1}- n_{O2}} {n_{O2}}$	$\tfrac{n_{O1}- n_{O2}} {n_{O2}}: \tfrac{n_{I1}- n_{I2}} {n_{I2}}$ $=\tfrac{n_{O1}- n_{O2}} {n_{O2}} \cdot \tfrac{n_{I2}} {n_{I1}- n_{I2}}$	Δ Input $\tfrac{n_{I1}- n_{I2}} {n_{I2}}$	$\tfrac{n_{G1}- n_{G2}} {n_{G2}}$	$\tfrac{n_{B1}- n_{B2}} {n_{B2}}$	$\tfrac{n_{C1}- n_{C2}} {n_{C2}}$
8HP 6HP (Note: Direct predecessor: To reflect the progress of the specific model change)	8 (Note: plus 1 reverse gear); 6	Progress	9; 8	4; 3 (Note: of which 2 gearsets are combined as a compound Ravigneaux gearset)	2; 2	3; 3
Δ Number	2	Progress	1	1	0	0
Relative Δ	0.333 $\tfrac{2} {6}$	2.667 $\tfrac{2} {6}: \tfrac{1} {8}= \tfrac{1} {3} \cdot \tfrac{8} {1}= \tfrac{8} {3}$	0.125 $\tfrac{1} {8}$	0.333 $\tfrac{1} {3}$	0.000 $\tfrac{0} {2}$	0.000 $\tfrac{0} {3}$
8HP 3-Speed (Note: Reference standard (benchmark): 3-speed transmissions with torque converters have established the modern market for automatic transmissions and thus made it possible in the first place, as this design proved to be a particularly successful compromise between cost and performance; It became the archetype and dominated the world market for around 3 decades, setting the standard for automatic transmissions. It was only when fuel consumption became the focus of interest that this design reached its limits, which is why it has now completely disappeared from the market; What has remained is the orientation that it offers as a reference standard (point of reference, benchmark) for this market for determining progressiveness and thus the market position of all other, later designs; All transmission variants consist of 7 main components; Typical examples are; Turbo-Hydramatic from GM; Cruise-O-Matic from Ford; TorqueFlite from Chrysler; Detroit Gear from BorgWarner for Studebaker; BW-35 from BorgWarner and as T35 from Aisin; 3N 71 from Nissan/Jatco; 3 HP from ZF Friedrichshafen; W3A 040 and W3B 050 from Mercedes-Benz)	8; 3	Market Position	9; 7	4; 2	2; 3	3; 2
Δ Number	5	Market Position	2	2	–1	1
Relative Δ	1.667 $\tfrac{5} {3}$	5.833 $\tfrac{5} {3}: \tfrac{2} {7}= \tfrac{5} {3} \cdot \tfrac{7} {2}= \tfrac{35} {6}$	0.286 $\tfrac{2} {7}$	1.000 $\tfrac{1} {1}$	−0.333 $\tfrac{-1} {3}$	0.500 $\tfrac{1} {2}$

=== Quality ===
The ratios of the 8 gears are relatively unevenly distributed in all versions. Particularly noticeable are

- the too small step between 3rd and 4th gear
- and the too large step between 7th and 8th gear.

This cannot be eliminated without affecting all other gear ratios. On the other hand the selected gearset concept offers 2 to 3 gears more than conventional transmissions of comparable manufacturing costs, which more than compensates for the weaknesses.

Additionally, the gearset brings the ability to shift in a non-sequential manner – going from gear 8 to gear 2 in extreme situations simply by changing one shift element (actuating brake B and releasing clutch D).

Planetary gearset concept: gear ratio quality (Note: Revised 14 January 2026 Nomenclature: $S_n =$ sun gear: number of teeth; $R_n =$ ring gear: number of teeth; $\color{gray}{C_n = }$ carrier or planetary gear carrier (not needed); $s_n =$ sun gear: shaft speed; $r_n =$ ring gear: shaft speed; $c_n =$ carrier or planetary gear carrier: shaft speed; With $n =$ gear is: $i_n =$ gear ratio or transmission ratio; $\omega_{1;n} = \omega_t =$ shaft speed shaft 1: input (turbine) shaft; $\omega_{2;n} =$ shaft speed shaft 2: output shaft; $T_{1;n} = T_t =$ torque shaft 1: input (turbine) shaft; $T_{2;n} =$ torque shaft 2: output shaft; $\mu_n =$ torque ratio or torque conversion ratio; $\eta_n =$ efficiency; $i_0 =$ stationary gear ratio; $\eta_0 =$ (assumed) stationary gear efficiency)
In-Depth Analysis (Note: Gear ratio (transmission ratio) $i_n$ — speed conversion —: The gear ratio $i_n$ is the ratio of; input shaft speed $\omega_{1;n}$; to output shaft speed $\omega_{2;n}$; and therefore corresponds to the reciprocal of the shaft speeds; $i_n = \frac{1} {\frac{\omega_{2;n}} {\omega_{1;n}}} = \frac{\omega_{1;n}} {\omega_{2;n}} = \frac{\omega_t} {\omega_{2;n}}$) With Assessment And Torque Ratio (Note: Torque ratio (torque conversion ratio) $\mu_n$ — torque conversion —: The torque ratio $\mu_n$ is the ratio of; output torque $T_{2;n}$; to input torque $T_{1;n}$; minus efficiency losses; and therefore corresponds (apart from the efficiency losses) to the reciprocal of the shaft speeds too; $\mu_n = i_n \eta_{n;\eta_0} = \frac{\omega_{1;n} \eta_{n;\eta_0}} {\omega_{2;n}} = \frac{T_{2;n} \eta_{n;\eta_0}} {T_{1;n}}$; whereby $\eta_{n;\eta_0}$ may vary from gear to gear according to the formulas listed in this table and $0 \le \eta_{n;\eta_0} \le 1$) And Efficiency Calculation (Note: Efficiency: The efficiency $\eta_n$ is calculated; from the torque ratio; in relation to the gear ratio (transmission ratio); $\eta_n = \frac{\mu_n} {i_n}$; Power loss for single meshing gears; is in the range of 1 % to 1.5 %; helical gear pairs, which are used to reduce noise in passenger cars, are in the upper part of the loss range; spur gear pairs, which are limited to commercial vehicles due to their poorer noise comfort, are in the lower part of the loss range; Corridor for torque ratio and efficiency: in planetary gearsets, the stationary gear ratio $i_0$ is formed via the planetary gears and thus by two meshes; for reasons of simplification, the efficiency for both meshes together is commonly specified there; the efficiencies $\eta_0$ specified here are based on assumed efficiencies for the stationary ratio $i_0$; of $\eta_0 = 0.9800$ (upper value); and $\eta_0 = 0.9700$ (lower value); for both interventions together; The corresponding efficiency; for single-meshing gear pairs is ${\eta_0}^\tfrac {1}{2}$; at $0.9800^\tfrac{1} {2} = 0.98995$ (upper value); and $0.9700^\tfrac{1} {2} = 0.98489$ (lower value))			Planetary Gearset: Teeth (Note: Layout: Input and output are on opposite sides; Planetary gearset 1 is on the input (turbine) side; Input (turbine) shafts are C_{2} and, if actuated, R_{3} and S_{4}; Output shaft is C_{4})				Count	Nomi- nal (Note: Total ratio span (total gear ratio/total transmission ratio) nominal: $\frac{\omega_{2;n}} {\omega_{2;1}} = \frac{\frac{\omega_{2;n}} {\omega_{2;1} \omega_{2;n}}} {\frac{\omega_{2;1}} {\omega_{2;1} \omega_{2;n}}} = \frac{\frac{1} {\omega_{2;1}}} {\frac{1} {\omega_{2;n}}} = \frac{\frac{\omega_t} {\omega_{2;1}}} {\frac{\omega_t} {\omega_{2;n}}} = \frac{i_1} {i_n}$; A wider span enables the; downspeeding when driving outside the city limits; increase the climbing ability; when driving over mountain passes or off-road; or when towing a trailer) Effec- tive (Note: Total ratio span (total gear ratio/total transmission ratio) effective: $\frac{\omega_{2;n}} {max(\omega_{2;1};|\omega_{2;R}|)} = \frac{min(i_1;|i_R|)} {i_n}$; The span is only effective to the extent that; the reverse gear ratio; matches that of 1st gear; see also Standard R:1; Digression Reverse gear: is usually longer than 1st gear; the effective span is therefore of central importance for describing the suitability of a transmission; because in these cases, the nominal spread conveys a misleading picture; which is only unproblematic for vehicles with high specific power; Market participants: Manufacturers naturally have no interest in specifying the effective span; Users have not yet formulated the practical benefits that the effective span has for them; The effective span has not yet played a role in research and teaching; Contrary to its significance: the effective span has therefore not yet been able to establish itself; either in theory; or in practice.; End of digression)	Cen- ter (Note: Ratio span's center: $(i_1 i_n)^\frac{1} {2}$; The center indicates the speed level of the transmission; Together with the final drive ratio; it gives the shaft speed level of the vehicle)
In-Depth Analysis With Assessment And Torque Ratio And Efficiency Calculation			Planetary Gearset: Teeth				Count	Nomi- nal Effec- tive	Avg. (Note: Average gear step: $\left( \frac{\omega_{2;n}} {\omega_{2;1}} \right) ^\frac{1} {n-1} = \left( \frac{i_1} {i_n} \right) ^\frac{1} {n-1}$; There are $n-1$ gear steps between $n$ gears; with decreasing step width; the gears connect better to each other; shifting comfort increases)
Model Type	Version		S_{1} (Note: Sun 1: sun gear of gearset 1) R_{1} (Note: Ring 1: ring gear of gearset 1)	S_{2} (Note: Sun 2: sun gear of gearset 2) R_{2} (Note: Ring 2: ring gear of gearset 2)	S_{3} (Note: Sun 3: sun gear of gearset 3) R_{3} (Note: Ring 3: ring gear of gearset 3)	S_{4} (Note: Sun 4: sun gear of gearset 4) R_{4} (Note: Ring 4: ring gear of gearset 4)	Brakes Clutches	Ratio Span	Gear Step (Note: Standard 50:50 — 50 % is above and 50 % is below the average gear step —: With steadily decreasing gear steps (yellow highlighted line Step); and a particularly large step from 1st to 2nd gear; the lower half of the gear steps (between the small gears; rounded down, here the first 3) is always larger; and the upper half of the gear steps (between the large gears; rounded up, here the last 4) is always smaller; than the average gear step (cell highlighted yellow two rows above on the far right); lower half: smaller gear steps are a waste of possible ratios (red bold); upper half: larger gear steps are unsatisfactory (red bold))
Gear	R	1	2	3	4	5	6	7	8
Gear Ratio	${i_R}$	${i_1}$	${i_2}$	${i_3}$	${i_4}$	${i_5}$	${i_6}$	${i_7}$	${i_8}$
Step	$-\frac{i_R} {i_1}$ (Note: Standard R:1 — reverse and 1st gear have the same ratio —: The ideal reverse gear has the same transmission ratio as 1st gear; no impairment when maneuvering; especially when towing a trailer; a torque converter can only partially compensate for this deficiency; Plus 11.11 % minus 10 % compared to 1st gear is good; Plus 25 % minus 20 % is acceptable (red); Above this is unsatisfactory (bold); see also Total ratio span (total gear ratio/total transmission ratio) effective)	$\frac{i_1} {i_1}$	$\frac{i_1} {i_2}$ (Note: Standard 1:2 — gear step 1st to 2nd gear as small as possible —: With continuously decreasing gear steps (yellow marked line Step); the largest gear step is the one from 1st to 2nd gear, which; for a good speed connection and; a smooth gear shift; must be as small as possible; A gear ratio of up to 1.6667 : 1 (5 : 3) is good; Up to 1.7500 : 1 (7 : 4) is acceptable (red); Above is unsatisfactory (bold))	$\frac{i_2} {i_3}$	$\frac{i_3} {i_4}$	$\frac{i_4} {i_5}$	$\frac{i_5} {i_6}$	$\frac{i_6} {i_7}$	$\frac{i_7} {i_8}$
Δ Step (Note: From large to small gears (from right to left)) (Note: Standard STEP — from large to small gears: steady and progressive increase in gear steps —: Gear steps should; increase: Δ Step (first green highlighted line Δ Step) is always greater than 1; As progressive as possible: Δ Step is always greater than the previous step; Not progressively increasing is acceptable (red); Not increasing is unsatisfactory (bold))			$\tfrac{i_1} {i_2} : \tfrac{i_2} {i_3}$	$\tfrac{i_2} {i_3} : \tfrac{i_3} {i_4}$	$\tfrac{i_3} {i_4} : \tfrac{i_4} {i_5}$	$\tfrac{i_4} {i_5} : \tfrac{i_5} {i_6}$	$\tfrac{i_5} {i_6} : \tfrac{i_6} {i_7}$	$\tfrac{i_6} {i_7} : \tfrac{i_7} {i_8}$	
Shaft Speed	$\frac{i_1} {i_R}$	$\frac{i_1} {i_1}$	$\frac{i_1} {i_2}$	$\frac{i_1} {i_3}$	$\frac{i_1} {i_4}$	$\frac{i_1} {i_5}$	$\frac{i_1} {i_6}$	$\frac{i_1} {i_7}$	$\frac{i_1} {i_8}$
Δ Shaft Speed (Note: Standard SPEED — from small to large gears: steady increase in shaft speed difference —: Shaft speed differences should; increase: Δ Shaft Speed (second line marked in green Δ (Shaft) Speed) is always greater than the previous one; 1 difference smaller than the previous one is acceptable (red); 2 consecutive ones are a waste of possible ratios (bold))	$0 - \tfrac{i_1} {i_R}$	$\tfrac{i_1} {i_1} - 0$	$\tfrac{i_1} {i_2} - \tfrac{i_1} {i_1}$	$\tfrac{i_1} {i_3} - \tfrac{i_1} {i_2}$	$\tfrac{i_1} {i_4} - \tfrac{i_1} {i_3}$	$\tfrac{i_1} {i_5} - \tfrac{i_1} {i_4}$	$\tfrac{i_1} {i_6} - \tfrac{i_1} {i_5}$	$\tfrac{i_1} {i_7} - \tfrac{i_1} {i_6}$	$\tfrac{i_1} {i_8} - \tfrac{i_1} {i_7}$
Torque Ratio	$\mu_R$	$\mu_1$	$\mu_2$	$\mu_3$	$\mu_4$	$\mu_5$	$\mu_6$	$\mu_7$	$\mu_8$
Efficiency $\eta_n$	$\frac{\mu_R} {i_R}$	$\frac{\mu_1} {i_1}$	$\frac{\mu_2} {i_2}$	$\frac{\mu_3} {i_3}$	$\frac{\mu_4} {i_4}$	$\frac{\mu_5} {i_5}$	$\frac{\mu_6} {i_6}$	$\frac{\mu_7} {i_7}$	$\frac{\mu_8} {i_8}$
2008: Pilot series (Note: without generation designation)
8HP 70	700 N⋅m (516 lb⋅ft)		48 96	48 96	69 (Note: Gearset 3: 69/111 or 46/74 · 46/74 is unlikely, since the planetary gear had 14 teeth, which is fewer than the required 23 teeth · 21 teeth in the 69/111 configuration is acceptable for non-commercial vehicles); 111	23 85	2; 3	7.0435; 4.9452	1.7693
8HP 70	700 N⋅m (516 lb⋅ft)		48 96	48 96	69 111	23 85	2; 3	7.0435; 4.9452	1.3216
Gear	R	1	2	3	4	5	6	7	8
Gear Ratio	−3.2968 $-\tfrac{1,744}{529}$	4.6957 $\tfrac{108}{23}$	3.1304 $\tfrac{72}{23}$	2.1039 $\tfrac{162}{77}$	1.6667 $\tfrac{5}{3}$	1.2845 $\tfrac{8,826}{6,871}$	1.0000 $\tfrac{1}{1}$	0.8392 $\tfrac{120}{143}$	0.6667 $\tfrac{2}{3}$
Step	0.7021	1.0000	1.5000	1.4879	1.2623	1.2975	1.2845	1.1917	1.2587
Δ Step			1.0081	1.1787	0.9729	1.0101	1.0779	0.9467	
Speed	–1.4243	1.0000	1.5000	2.2319	2.8174	3.6555	4.6957	5.5957	7.0435
Δ Speed	1.4243	1.0000	0.5000	0.7319	0.5855	0.8382	1.0401	0.9000	1.4478
Torque Ratio	–3.1186 –3.0313	4.6217; 4.5848	3.0603; 3.0253	2.0820; 2.0709	1.6446; 1.6336	1.2720; 1.2658	1.0000	0.8347; 0.8324	0.6622; 0.6599
Efficiency $\eta_n$	0.9460; 0.9195	0.9843; 0.9764	0.9776; 0.9664	0.9896; 0.9843	0.9867; 0.9802	0.9903; 0.9854	1.0000	0.9947; 0.9920	0.9932; 0.9898
2010: 1st generation
HP 30/I 8HP 45	300 N⋅m (221 lb⋅ft); 450 N⋅m (332 lb⋅ft)		48 96	48 96	60; 96	28; 104	2; 3	7.0714; 4.9429	1.7728
HP 30/I 8HP 45	300 N⋅m (221 lb⋅ft); 450 N⋅m (332 lb⋅ft)		48 96	48 96	60; 96	28; 104	2; 3	7.0714; 4.9429	1.3224
Gear	R	1	2	3	4	5	6	7	8
Gear Ratio	−3.2952 $-\tfrac{346}{105}$	4.7143 $\tfrac{33}{7}$	3.1429 $\tfrac{22}{7}$	2.1064 $\tfrac{99}{47}$	1.6667 $\tfrac{5}{3}$	1.2854 $\tfrac{1,171}{911}$	1.0000 $\tfrac{1}{1}$	0.8387 $\tfrac{26}{31}$	0.6667 $\tfrac{2}{3}$
Step	0.6990	1.0000	1.5000	1.4921	1.2638	1.2966	1.2854	1.1923	1.2581
Δ Step			1.0053	1.1805	0.9747	1.0087	1.0781	0.9477	
Speed	–1.4306	1.0000	1.5000	2.2381	2.8286	3.6576	4.7143	5.6209	7.0714
Δ Speed	1.4306	1.0000	0.5000	0.7381	0.5905	0.8390	1.0467	0.9066	1.45058
Torque Ratio	–3.1171 –3.0299	4.6400; 4.6029	3.0724; 3.0373	2.0844; 2.0734	1.6446; 1.6336	1.2729; 1.2666	1.0000	0.8343; 0.8320	0.6622; 0.6599
Efficiency $\eta_n$	0.9460; 0.9195	0.9842; 0.9764	0.9776; 0.9664	0.9896; 0.9843	0.9867; 0.9802	0.9903; 0.9854	1.0000	0.9944; 0.9915	0.9943; 0.9913
8HP 55 8HP 65 8HP 70 8HP 90	650 N⋅m (479 lb⋅ft); 650 N⋅m (479 lb⋅ft); 700 N⋅m (516 lb⋅ft); 900 N⋅m (664 lb⋅ft)		48 96	48 96	69 111	28; 104	2; 3	7.0714; 4.9752	1.7728
8HP 55 8HP 65 8HP 70 8HP 90	650 N⋅m (479 lb⋅ft); 650 N⋅m (479 lb⋅ft); 700 N⋅m (516 lb⋅ft); 900 N⋅m (664 lb⋅ft)		48 96	48 96	69 111	28; 104	2; 3	7.0714; 4.9752	1.3224
Gear	R	1	2	3	4	5	6	7	8
Gear Ratio	−3.3168 $-\tfrac{534}{161}$	4.7143 $\tfrac{33}{7}$	3.1429 $\tfrac{22}{7}$	2.1064 $\tfrac{99}{47}$	1.6667 $\tfrac{5}{3}$	1.2847 $\tfrac{5,397}{4,201}$	1.0000 $\tfrac{1}{1}$	0.8392 $\tfrac{120}{143}$	0.6667 $\tfrac{2}{3}$
Step	0.7036	1.0000	1.5000	1.4921	1.2638	1.2973	1.2847	1.1917	1.2587
Δ Step			1.0053	1.1806	0.9742	1.0098	1.0781	0.9467	
Speed	–1.4213	1.0000	1.5000	2.2381	2.8286	3.6696	4.7143	5.6179	7.0714
Δ Speed	1.4243	1.0000	0.5000	0.7381	0.5905	0.8410	1.0447	0.9036	1.4536
Torque Ratio	–3.1377 –3.0499	4.6400; 4.6029	3.0724; 3.0373	2.0844; 2.0734	1.6446; 1.6336	1.2722; 1.2660	1.0000	0.8347; 0.8324	0.6622; 0.6599
Efficiency $\eta_n$	0.9460; 0.9195	0.9842; 0.9764	0.9776; 0.9664	0.9896; 0.9843	0.9867; 0.9802	0.9903; 0.9854	1.0000	0.9947; 0.9920	0.9932; 0.9898
2014: 2nd generation
8HP 75/I	740 N⋅m (546 lb⋅ft)		48 96	48 96	69 111	28; 104	2; 3	7.0714; 4.9752	1.7728
8HP 75/I	740 N⋅m (546 lb⋅ft)		48 96	48 96	69 111	28; 104	2; 3	7.0714; 4.9752	1.3224
Gear	R	1	2	3	4	5	6	7	8
Gear Ratio	−3.3168	4.7143	3.1429	2.1064	1.6667	1.2847	1.0000	0.8392	0.6667
8HP 30/II 8HP 50	300 N⋅m (221 lb⋅ft); 500 N⋅m (369 lb⋅ft)		48 96	54; 96	60; 96	24; 96	2; 3	7.8125; 5.1840	1.7889
8HP 30/II 8HP 50	300 N⋅m (221 lb⋅ft); 500 N⋅m (369 lb⋅ft)		48 96	54; 96	60; 96	24; 96	2; 3	7.8125; 5.1840	1.3413
Gear	R	1	2	3	4	5	6	7	8
Gear Ratio	−3.4560 $-\tfrac{432}{125}$	5.0000 $\tfrac{5}{1}$	3.2000 $\tfrac{16}{5}$	2.1429 $\tfrac{15}{7}$	1.7200 $\tfrac{43}{25}$	1.3139 $\tfrac{1,507}{1,147}$	1.0000 $\tfrac{1}{1}$	0.8221 $\tfrac{208}{253}$	0.6400 $\tfrac{16}{25}$
Step	0.6912	1.0000	1.5625	1.4933	1.2458	1.3091	1.3139	1.2163	1.2846
Δ Step			1.0463	1.1986	0.9517	0.9964	1.0802	0.9469	
Speed	–1.4468	1.0000	1.5625	2.3333	2.9070	3.8056	5.0000	6.0817	7.8125
Δ Speed	1.4468	1.0000	0.5625	0.7708	0.5736	0.8986	1.1944	1.0817	1.7308
Torque Ratio	–3.2698 –3.1785	4.9200; 4.8800	3.1258; 3.0888	2.1207; 2.1096	1.6965; 1.6848	1.3008; 1.2943	1.0000	0.8873; 0.8148	0.6353; 0.6330
Efficiency $\eta_n$	0.9461; 0.9197	0.9840; 0.9760	0.9768; 0.9653	0.9897; 0.9845	0.9863; 0.9796	0.9901; 0.9851	1.0000	0.9941; 0.9911	0.9927; 0.9890
8HP 75/II 8HP 95	740 N⋅m (546 lb⋅ft); 900 N⋅m (664 lb⋅ft) (Note: The new BMW M760 Li xDrive · BMW Media Information Germany · 02/2016 · P. 23 · German: Der neue BMW M760 Li xDrive · BMW Medieninformation Deutschland · BMW Media Information Germany · 02/2016 · S. 23 · and The new BMW M760 Li xDrive · Technical Specifications · BMW Media Information Austria · 01/2017 · P. 2 · German: Der neue BMW M760 Li xDrive · Technische Daten · BMW Medieninformation Österreich · 01/2017 · S. 2 · 800 N⋅m (590 lb⋅ft))		48 96	54; 96	69 111	24; 96	2; 3	7.8125; 2.2261	1.7889
8HP 75/II 8HP 95	740 N⋅m (546 lb⋅ft); 900 N⋅m (664 lb⋅ft)		48 96	54; 96	69 111	24; 96	2; 3	7.8125; 2.2261	1.3413
Gear	R	1	2	3	4	5	6	7	8
Gear Ratio	−3.4783 $-\tfrac{80}{23}$	5.0000 $\tfrac{5}{1}$	3.2000 $\tfrac{16}{5}$	2.1429 $\tfrac{15}{7}$	1.7200 $\tfrac{43}{25}$	1.3131 $\tfrac{2,315}{1,763}$	1.0000 $\tfrac{1}{1}$	0.8226 $\tfrac{320}{389}$	0.6400 $\tfrac{16}{25}$
Step	0.6957	1.0000	1.5625	1.4933	1.2458	1.3099	1.3131	1.2156	1.2853
Δ Step			1.0463	1.1986	0.9511	0.9975	1.0802	0.9458	
Speed	–1.4375	1.0000	1.5625	2.3333	2.9070	3.8078	5.0000	6.0781	7.8125
Δ Speed	1.4375	1.0000	0.5625	0.7708	0.5736	0.9008	1.1922	1.0781	1.7344
Torque Ratio	–3.2910 –3.1993	4.9200; 4.8800	3.1258; 3.0888	2.1207; 2.1096	1.6965; 1.6848	1.3001; 1.2935	1.0000	0.8178; 0.8153	0.6353; 0.6330
Efficiency $\eta_n$	0.9462; 0.9198	0.9840; 0.9760	0.9768; 0.9653	0.9897; 0.9845	0.9863; 0.9796	0.9901; 0.9851	1.0000	0.9942; 0.9911	0.9927; 0.9890
2018: 3rd generation
8HP 76/I	760 N⋅m (561 lb⋅ft) (Note: narrow total ratio span · preferebly for petrol engines, sports cars, and high performance engines · Alpina B3 Saloon AWD · Technical Data · 730 N⋅m (538 lb⋅ft))		48 96	54; 96	69 111	24; 96	2; 3	7.8125; 5.4348	1.7889
8HP 76/I	760 N⋅m (561 lb⋅ft)		48 96	54; 96	69 111	24; 96	2; 3	7.8125; 5.4348	1.3413
Gear	R	1	2	3	4	5	6	7	8
Gear Ratio	−3.4783	5.0000	3.2000	2.1429	1.7200	1.3131	1.0000	0.8226	0.6400
8HP 30/III 8HP 51	300 N⋅m (221 lb⋅ft) (Note: Technical specifications · The new BMW 3 Series Sedan · BMW Media Information · 03/2019 · p. 2: BMW 320i Sedan · 300 N⋅m (221 lb⋅ft)); 500 N⋅m (369 lb⋅ft) (Note: loc. cit. · p. 10: BMW M340i xDrive Sedan · 500 N⋅m (369 lb⋅ft))		48 96	54; 96	60; 96	24; 102	2; 3	8.2031; 5.8000	1.8330
8HP 30/III 8HP 51	300 N⋅m (221 lb⋅ft); 500 N⋅m (369 lb⋅ft)		48 96	54; 96	60; 96	24; 102	2; 3	8.2031; 5.8000	1.3507
Gear	R	1	2	3	4	5	6	7	8
Gear Ratio	−3.7120 $-\tfrac{464}{125}$	5.2500 $\tfrac{21}{4}$	3.3600 $\tfrac{84}{25}$	2.1724 $\tfrac{63}{29}$	1.7200 $\tfrac{43}{25}$	1.3161 $\tfrac{6,371}{4,841}$	1.0000 $\tfrac{1}{1}$	0.8221 $\tfrac{208}{253}$	0.6400 $\tfrac{16}{25}$
Step	0.7070	1.0000	1.5625	1.5467	1.2630	1.3069	1.3161	1.2163	1.2846
Δ Step			1.0102	1.2246	0.9664	0.9931	1.0820	0.9469	
Speed	–1.4143	1.0000	1.5625	2.4167	3.0523	3.9892	5.2500	6.3858	8.2031
Δ Speed	1.4143	1.0000	0.5625	0.8542	0.6357	0.9369	1.2608	1.1358	1.8173
Torque Ratio	–3.5138 –3.4168	5.1650; 5.1225	3.2815; 3.2423	2.1501; 2.1389	1.6965; 1.6848	1.3031; 1.2966	1.0000	0.8173; 0.8148	0.6353; 0.6330
Efficiency $\eta_n$	0.9466; 0.9205	0.9838; 0.9757	0.9766; 0.9650	0.9897; 0.9846	0.9863; 0.9796	0.9902; 0.9852	1.0000	0.9941; 0.9911	0.9927; 0.9890
8HP 76/II	760 N⋅m (561 lb⋅ft) (Note: wide total ratio span · preferebly for Diesel engines, offroad cars, and low performance engines · loc. cit. · p. 18: BMW 330d Sedan · 580 N⋅m (428 lb⋅ft) and Alpina D3 S Saloon AWD · Technical Data · 730 N⋅m (538 lb⋅ft))		48 96	54; 96	69 111	24; 108	2; 3	8.5938; 6.2391	1.8762
8HP 76/II	760 N⋅m (561 lb⋅ft)		48 96	54; 96	69 111	24; 108	2; 3	8.5938; 6.2391	1.3597
Gear	R	1	2	3	4	5	6	7	8
Gear Ratio	−3.9930 $-\tfrac{2,296}{575}$	5.5000 $\tfrac{11}{2}$	3.5200 $\tfrac{88}{25}$	2.2000 $\tfrac{11}{5}$	1.7200 $\tfrac{43}{25}$	1.3172 $\tfrac{191}{145}$	1.0000 $\tfrac{1}{1}$	0.8226 $\tfrac{320}{389}$	0.6400 $\tfrac{16}{25}$
Step	0.7260	1.0000	1.5625	1.6000	1.2791	1.3058	1.3172	1.2156	1.2853
Δ Step			0.9766	1.2509	0.9796	0.9913	1.0836	0.9458	
Speed	–1.3774	1.0000	1.5625	2.5000	3.1977	4.1754	5.5000	6.6859	8.5938
Δ Speed	1.3774	1.0000	0.5625	0.9375	0.6977	0.9777	1.3246	1.1859	1.8321
Torque Ratio	–3.7818 –3.6783	5.4100; 5.3650	3.4371; 3.3958	2.1776; 2.1663	1.6965; 1.6848	1.3044; 1.2979	1.0000	0.8178; 0.8153	0.6353; 0.6330
Efficiency $\eta_n$	0.9471; 0.9212	0.9836; 0.9755	0.9765; 0.9647	0.9898; 0.9847	0.9863; 0.9796	0.9902; 0.9853	1.0000	0.9942; 0.9911	0.9927; 0.9890
2022: 4th generation
8HP 100	1,000 N⋅m (738 lb⋅ft) (Note: narrow total ratio span · preferebly for petrol engines, sports cars, and high performance engines · The first-ever BMW XM · Market launch September 2022 The all-new BMW M5 · Market launch June 2024)		48 96	54; 96	60; 108	24; 96	2; 3	7.8125; 6.2000	1.7889
8HP 100	1,000 N⋅m (738 lb⋅ft)		48 96	54; 96	60; 108	24; 96	2; 3	7.8125; 6.2000	1.3413
Gear	R	1	2	3	4	5	6	7	8
Gear Ratio	−3.9680 $-\tfrac{496}{125}$	5.0000 $\tfrac{5}{1}$	3.2000 $\tfrac{16}{5}$	2.1429 $\tfrac{15}{7}$	1.7200 $\tfrac{43}{25}$	1.2973 $\tfrac{1,571}{1,211}$	1.0000 $\tfrac{1}{1}$	0.8327 $\tfrac{224}{269}$	0.6400 $\tfrac{16}{25}$
Step	0.7936	1.0000	1.5625	1.4933	1.2458	1.3259	1.2973	1.2009	1.3011
Δ Step			1.0463	1.1986	0.9397	1.0220	1.0803	0.9230	
Speed	–1.2601	1.0000	1.5625	2.3333	2.9070	3.8542	5.0000	6.0045	7.8125
Δ Speed	1.2601	1.0000	0.5625	0.7708	0.5736	0.9473	1.1458	1.0045	1.8080
Torque Ratio	–3.7579 –3.6550	4.9200; 4.8800	3.1258; 3.0888	2.1207; 2.1096	1.6965; 1.6848	1.2846; 1.2782	1.0000	0.8280; 0.8256	0.6353; 0.6330
Efficiency $\eta_n$	0.9471; 0.9211	0.9840; 0.9760	0.9768; 0.9653	0.9897; 0.9845	0.9863; 0.9796	0.9902; 0.9853	1.0000	0.9944; 0.9915	0.9927; 0.9890
8HP 80	800 N⋅m (590 lb⋅ft) (Note: wide total ratio span · preferebly for Diesel engines, offroad cars, and low performance engines · Progress and efficiency with added variety: additional drive system variants and innovations for the new BMW 7 Series · Market launch 2022/2023 Alpina XB7 AWD · Technical Data)		48 96	54; 96	60; 108	24; 108	2; 3	8.5938; 7.1000	1.8762
8HP 80	800 N⋅m (590 lb⋅ft)		48 96	54; 96	60; 108	24; 108	2; 3	8.5938; 7.1000	1.3597
Gear	R	1	2	3	4	5	6	7	8
Gear Ratio	−4.5440 $-\tfrac{1,704}{375}$	5.5000 $\tfrac{11}{2}$	3.5200 $\tfrac{88}{25}$	2.2000 $\tfrac{11}{5}$	1.7200 $\tfrac{43}{25}$	1.3010 $\tfrac{389}{299}$	1.0000 $\tfrac{1}{1}$	0.8327 $\tfrac{224}{269}$	0.6400 $\tfrac{16}{25}$
Step	0.8262	1.0000	1.5625	1.6000	1.2791	1.3221	1.3010	1.2009	1.3011
Δ Step			0.9766	1.2509	0.9675	1.0162	1.0834	0.9230	
Speed	–1.2104	1.0000	1.5625	2.5000	3.1977	4.2275	5.5000	6.6049	8.5938
Δ Speed	1.2104	1.0000	0.5625	0.9375	0.6977	1.0298	1.2725	1.1049	1.9888
Torque Ratio	–4.3071 –4.1910	5.4100; 5.3650	3.4371; 3.3958	2.1776; 2.1663	1.6965; 1.6848	1.2885; 1.2822	1.0000	0.8280; 0.8256	0.6353; 0.6330
Efficiency $\eta_n$	0.9479; 0.9223	0.9836; 0.9755	0.9765; 0.9647	0.9898; 0.9847	0.9863; 0.9796	0.9904; 0.9856	1.0000	0.9944; 0.9915	0.9927; 0.9890
2016: Racing cars
8P 45R (Note: without hydraulic torque converter · narrow total ratio span of 4.2)	450 N⋅m (332 lb⋅ft) – 1,050 N⋅m (774 lb⋅ft)		TBD	TBD	60; 96	TBD	2; 3	4.2000; TBD	TBD
8P 45R	450 N⋅m (332 lb⋅ft) – 1,050 N⋅m (774 lb⋅ft)		TBD	TBD	60; 96	TBD	2; 3	4.2000; TBD	1.2275
Gear	R	1	2	3	4	5	6	7	8
Gear Ratio	TBD	TBD	TBD	TBD	TBD	TBD	1.0000	TBD	TBD
2017: Commercial vehicles (Note: based on the same gearset concept as the 8HP transmissions)
8AP 600 T (Note: Automatic Powershift Transmission for Trucks) 8AP 800 T 8AP 1000 T 8AP 1200 T	600 N⋅m (443 lb⋅ft); 800 N⋅m (590 lb⋅ft); 1,000 N⋅m (738 lb⋅ft); 1,200 N⋅m (885 lb⋅ft) (Note: higher torque on demand)		65 (Note: Gearset 1 & 2 (& 3): 65/115 or 52/92 · 52/92 is unlikely, since the planetary gear had 20 teeth, which is fewer than the required 23 teeth · 25 teeth in the 65/115 configuration is good and essential for commercial vehicles); 115	65 115	62; 122	27; 105	2; 3	7.6522; 6.6523	1.7673
8AP 600 T 8AP 800 T 8AP 1000 T 8AP 1200 T	600 N⋅m (443 lb⋅ft); 800 N⋅m (590 lb⋅ft); 1,000 N⋅m (738 lb⋅ft); 1,200 N⋅m (885 lb⋅ft)		65 115	65 115	62; 122	27; 105	2; 3	7.6522; 6.6523	1.3374
Gear	R	1	2	3	4	5	6	7	8
Gear Ratio	−4.2501 $-\tfrac{10,672}{2,511}$	4.8889 $\tfrac{44}{9}$	3.1235 $\tfrac{253}{81}$	2.0334 $\tfrac{1,584}{779}$	1.6389 $\tfrac{59}{36}$	1.2541 $\tfrac{123,164}{98,209}$	1.0000 $\tfrac{1}{1}$	0.8400 $\tfrac{2,116}{2,519}$	0.6389 $\tfrac{23}{36}$
Step	0.8693	1.0000	1.5652	1.5361	1.2407	1.3068	1.2541	1.1905	1.3148
Δ Step			1.0190	1.2381	0.9494	1.0420	1.0535	0.9054	
Speed	–1.1503	1.0000	1.5652	2.4043	2.9831	3.8983	4.8889	5.8200	7.6522
Δ Speed	1.1503	1.0000	0.5652	0.8391	0.5787	0.9153	0.9906	0.9311	1.8322
Torque Ratio	–4.0268 –3.9174	4.8111; 4.7722	3.0513; 3.0152	2.0132; 2.0030	1.6181; 1.6077	1.2424; 1.2365	1.0000	0.8355; 0.8331	0.6342; 0.6318
Efficiency $\eta_n$	0.9475; 0.9217	0.9841; 0.9761	0.9769; 0.9654	0.9901; 0.9851	0.9873; 0.9810	0.9907; 0.9860	1.0000	0.9946; 0.9918	0.9927; 0.9890
8AP 1200 S (Note: Automatic Powershift Transmission for Special vehicles)	1,200 N⋅m (885 lb⋅ft)		65 115	65 115	65 115	27; 105	2; 3	7.6522; 5.8803	1.7673
8AP 1200 S	1,200 N⋅m (885 lb⋅ft)		65 115	65 115	65 115	27; 105	2; 3	7.6522; 5.8803	1.3374
Gear	R	1	2	3	4	5	6	7	8
Gear Ratio	−3.7569 $-\tfrac{3,956}{1,053}$	4.8889 $\tfrac{44}{9}$	3.1235 $\tfrac{253}{81}$	2.0334 $\tfrac{1,584}{779}$	1.6389 $\tfrac{59}{36}$	1.2676 $\tfrac{49,572}{39,107}$	1.0000 $\tfrac{1}{1}$	0.8305 $\tfrac{828}{997}$	0.6389 $\tfrac{23}{36}$
Step	0.7685	1.0000	1.5652	1.5361	1.2407	1.2929	1.2676	1.2041	1.2999
Δ Step			1.0190	1.2381	0.9596	1.0200	1.0527	0.9263	
Speed	–1.3013	1.0000	1.5652	2.4043	2.9831	3.8568	4.8889	5.8867	7.6522
Δ Speed	1.3013	1.0000	0.5652	0.8391	0.5787	0.8738	1.0321	0.9979	1.7654
Torque Ratio	–3.5566 –3.4585	4.8111; 4.7722	3.0513; 3.0152	2.0132; 2.0030	1.6181; 1.6077	1.2556; 1.2495	1.0000	0.8258; 0.8234	0.6342; 0.6318
Efficiency $\eta_n$	0.9467; 0.9206	0.9841; 0.9761	0.9769; 0.9654	0.9901; 0.9851	0.9873; 0.9810	0.9905; 0.9857	1.0000	0.9943; 0.9914	0.9927; 0.9890
Actuated shift elements (Note: Permanently coupled elements: S_{1} and S_{2}; C_{1} and R_{4}; R_{2} and S_{3}; R_{3} and S_{4})
Brake A (Note: Blocks S_{1} and S_{2})	❶	❶	❶					❶	❶
Brake B (Note: Blocks R_{1})	❶	❶	❶	❶	❶	❶			
Clutch C (Note: Couples R_{3} and S_{4} with the input (turbine))		❶		❶		❶	❶	❶	
Clutch D (Note: Couples C_{3} with C_{4})	❶				❶	❶	❶	❶	❶
Clutch E (Note: Couples R_{2} and S_{3} with R_{3} and S_{4})			❶	❶	❶		❶		❶
Geometric ratios: speed conversion
Gear Ratio R & 1 & 2 Ordinary (Note: Ordinary noted: For direct determination of the gear ratio) Elementary Noted (Note: Elementary noted: Alternative representation for determining the transmission ratio; Contains only operands; With simple fractions of both central gears of a planetary gearset; Or with the value 1; As a basis; For reliable; And traceable; Determination of the torque conversion ratio and efficiency)	$i_R = \frac{R_2 (S_3 S_4- R_3 R_4)} {S_3 S_4 (S_2+ R_2)}$			$i_1 = \frac{S_4+ R_4} {S_4}$			$i_2 = \frac{R_2 (S_4+ R_4)} {(S_2+ R_2) S_4}$		
Gear Ratio R & 1 & 2 Ordinary Elementary Noted	$i_R = \tfrac{1- \tfrac{R_3 R_4} {S_3 S_4}} {1+ \tfrac{S_2} {R_2}}$			$i_1 = 1+ \tfrac{R_4} {S_4}$			$i_2 = \tfrac{1+ \tfrac{R_4} {S_4}} {1+ \tfrac{S_2} {R_2}}$		
Gear Ratio 3 & 4 Ordinary Elementary Noted	$i_3 = \frac{(S_1+ R_1) (S_4+ R_4)} {S_4 R_1+ S_1 (S_4+ R_4)}$					$i_4 = 1+\frac{S_2 R_1} {S_1 (S_2+ R_2)}$			
Gear Ratio 3 & 4 Ordinary Elementary Noted	$i_3 = \tfrac{1} {\tfrac{1} {1+ \tfrac{R_1} {S_1}} +\tfrac{1} {\left( 1+ \tfrac{S_1} {R_1} \right) \left( 1+ \tfrac{R_4} {S_4} \right)}}$					$i_4 = 1+ \tfrac{\tfrac{R_1} {S_1}} {1+ \tfrac{R_2} {S_2}}$			
Gear Ratio 5 Ordinary Elementary Noted	$i_5 = \frac{S_1 R_2 R_4 (S_3+ R_3)+ S_2 S_3 (S_1+ R_1) (S_4+ R_4)} {S_1 R_4 (S_3 (S_2+ R_2)+ R_2 R_3)+ S_2 S_3 S_4 (S_1+ R_1)}$								
Gear Ratio 5 Ordinary Elementary Noted	$i_5 = \tfrac{1} {\tfrac{1} {{\tfrac{ \left( 1+ \tfrac{R_1} {S_1} \right) \left( 1+ \tfrac{S_4} {R_4} \right)} {1+ \tfrac{R_2} {S_2} \left( 1+ \tfrac{R_3} {S_3} \right)} + \tfrac{1} {\tfrac{1} {1+ \tfrac{S_3} {R_3}}+ \tfrac{1+ \tfrac{S_2} {R_2}} {1+ \tfrac{R_3} {S_3}}}}} + \tfrac{1} {1+ \tfrac{R_4} {S_4}+ \tfrac{ \tfrac{R_2 R_4} {S_2 S_4} \left( 1+ \tfrac{R_3} {S_3} \right)} {1+ \tfrac{R_1} {S_1}}}}$								
Gear Ratio 6 – 8 Ordinary Elementary Noted	$i_6 = \frac{1} {1}$		$i_7 = \frac{R_2 (S_3+ R_3)} {R_2 (S_3+ R_3)+ S_2 S_3}$				$i_8 = \frac{R_2} {S_2 + R_2}$		
Gear Ratio 6 – 8 Ordinary Elementary Noted	$i_6 = \frac{1} {1}$		$i_7 = \tfrac{1} {1+ \tfrac{\tfrac{S_2} {R_2}} {1+ \tfrac{R_3} {S_3}}}$				$i_8 = \tfrac{1} {1+ \tfrac{S_2} {R_2}}$		
Kinetic ratios: torque conversion
Torque Ratio R & 1 & 2	$\mu_R = \tfrac{1- \tfrac{R_3 R_4} {S_3 S_4} {\eta_0}^2} {1+ \tfrac{S_2} {R_2} \cdot \tfrac{1} {\eta_0}}$			$\mu_1 = 1+ \tfrac{R_4} {S_4} {\eta_0}$			$\mu_2 = \tfrac{1+ \tfrac{R_4} {S_4} \eta_0} {1+ \tfrac{S_2} {R_2} \cdot \tfrac{1} {\eta_0}}$		
Torque Ratio 3 & 4	$\mu_3 = \tfrac{1} {\tfrac{1} {1+ \tfrac{R_1} {S_1} {\eta_0}^\tfrac{1} {2}} +\tfrac{1} {\left( 1+ \tfrac{S_1} {R_1} {\eta_0}^\tfrac{1} {2} \right) \left( 1+ \tfrac{R_4} {S_4} \eta_0 \right)}}$					$\mu_4 = 1+ \tfrac{\tfrac{R_1} {S_1} \eta_0} {1+ \tfrac{R_2} {S_2} \cdot \tfrac{1} {\eta_0}}$			
Torque Ratio 5	$\mu_5 = \tfrac{1} {\tfrac{1} {{\tfrac{ \left( 1+ \tfrac{R_1} {S_1} {\eta_0}^\tfrac{1} {2} \right) \left( 1+ \tfrac{S_4} {R_4} {\eta_0}^\tfrac{1} {3} \right)} {1+ \tfrac{R_2} {S_2} \cdot \tfrac{1} {{\eta_0}^\tfrac{1} {3}} \left( 1+ \tfrac{R_3} {S_3} \cdot \tfrac{1} {{\eta_0}^\tfrac{1} {4}} \right)} + \tfrac{1} {\tfrac{1} {1+ \tfrac{S_3} {R_3} {\eta_0}^\tfrac{1} {4}} + \tfrac{1+ \tfrac{S_2} {R_2} \cdot \tfrac{1} {{\eta_0}^\tfrac{1} {3}}} {1+ \tfrac{R_3} {S_3} {\eta_0}^\tfrac{1} {4}}}}} + \tfrac{1} {1+ \tfrac{R_4} {S_4} {\eta_0}^\tfrac{1} {3} + \tfrac{ \tfrac{R_2 R_4} {S_2 S_4} {\eta_0}^\tfrac{2} {3} \left( 1+ \tfrac{R_3} {S_3} {\eta_0}^\tfrac{1} {4} \right)} {1+ \tfrac{R_1} {S_1} \cdot \tfrac{1} {{\eta_0}^\tfrac{1} {2}}}}}$								
Torque Ratio 6 – 8	$\mu_6 = \tfrac{1} {1}$		$\mu_7 = \tfrac{1} {1+ \tfrac{\tfrac{S_2} {R_2} \cdot \tfrac{1} {\eta_0}} {1+ \tfrac{R_3} {S_3} \eta_0}}$				$\mu_8 = \tfrac{1} {1+ \tfrac{S_2} {R_2} \cdot \tfrac{1} {\eta_0}}$		

== Applications ==
Variants and applications
Model	Max. torque petrol diesel	Car Model (Note: Passenger cars only) (Note: without any claim of completeness)
2008: Pilot series (8HP 70 only) · 2010: 1st generation
8HP 45	450 N⋅m (332 lb⋅ft); 500 N⋅m (369 lb⋅ft)	BMW 1 Series (F20); BMW X1 (E84); BMW 2 Series (F22) M235i; BMW 3 Series (F30); BMW 4 Series (F32); BMW 5 Series (F10/F11); BMW 6 Series (F06/F12/F13); BMW 7 Series (F01/F02); BMW X3 (F25); BMW X4 (F26); BMW X5 (E70) 35i; BMW X5 (F15); BMW X6 (F16); BMW Z4 (E89); Jaguar XE; Jaguar XF (X250) (2013–2015); Jaguar XJ (2013–2019); Lancia Thema V6; Land Rover Range Rover (L322) (2011–2012); Land Rover Range Rover (L405) (2012–2022); Land Rover Range Rover Velar I4 (2017–)
Torqueflite 845RE	450 N⋅m (332 lb⋅ft); 500 N⋅m (369 lb⋅ft)	Chrysler 300 3.6 L Pentastar V6 (2011–2023); Chrysler 300 C; Dodge Challenger 3.6 L Pentastar V6 (2015–2023); Dodge Charger 3.6 L Pentastar V6 (2012–2023); Dodge Durango 3.6 L Pentastar V6 (2014–2017); Jeep Grand Cherokee (WK2) 3.6 L Pentastar V6 (2014–2016); Ram 1500 3.6 L Pentastar V6 (2012–2019)
8HP 55	650 N⋅m (479 lb⋅ft); 650 N⋅m (479 lb⋅ft)	Audi A4 North American (US) B8/8.5 Quattro Versions (2011–2016); Audi A5 North American (US) B8/8.5 Quattro Versions (2011–2016); Audi A6 (C7); Audi A7 (C7); Audi A6 Hybrid (C7)
8HP 65	650 N⋅m (479 lb⋅ft); 650 N⋅m (479 lb⋅ft)	Audi A4 (B9); Audi S4 (B9); Audi S5 (B9); Audi A6 Hybrid (C7 PHEV) PR China; Audi A6 (C8); Audi A7 (C8); Audi S6 (C8); Audi Q7 (4M); Audi Q8; Audi A8 (D4); Audi A8 (D5); Porsche Cayenne (2018-); Volkswagen Touareg (2018-)
8HP 70 Pilot & 1st	700 N⋅m (516 lb⋅ft); 700 N⋅m (516 lb⋅ft)	Alpina B3 (F30/F31); Alpina D3 (F30/F31); Alpina B3 (G20/G21); Alpina D3 (G20/G21); Alpina B4 (F32/F33); Alpina D4 (F32/F33); Alpina XD4; Aston Martin Rapide S 2014–2020; Aston Martin Vanquish 2015–2018; Audi Q5 8AT version; BMW 3 Series (F30) 330d & 335d; BMW 4 Series (F32) 430d & 435d; BMW 5 Series (F10/F11); BMW 7 Series (F01/F02); BMW X5 (E70) 50i; Chrysler 300 5.7 L HEMI V8 (2015–2023); Dodge Challenger 5.7 L HEMI V8 (2015–2023); Dodge Charger 5.7 L HEMI V8 (2015–2023); Dodge Charger 6.4 L HEMI V8; Dodge Durango 5.7 L HEMI V8; Dodge Durango 6.4 L HEMI V8; Haval H9 (2017–); Iveco Daily (2014–); Jaguar F-Type V6 & V8; Jaguar XE 35t; Jaguar XF (X250) (2013–2015); Jaguar XJ (2013–2019); Jeep Grand Cherokee (WK2) 5.7 L HEMI V8 Engine Code [T] EZH & 6.4 L HEMI V8 Engine Code [J] ESG (2014–2021); Jeep Grand Cherokee (WK2) 3.0 L EcoDiesel V6 (2014–2016); Jeep Grand Cherokee WL & L 5.7 L HEMI V8 (2021–); Land Rover Discovery LR4 (2009–2016); Land Rover Range Rover Sport L320 SDV6 only (2012–2013); Land Rover Range Rover (L322) TDV8 only (2011–2012); Land Rover Range Rover (L405) (2012–2022); Land Rover Range Rover Sport L494 (2012–); Land Rover Range Rover Velar V6 & V8 (2017–); MAN TGE (longitudinal engine only) (2017–); Maserati Ghibli (M157); Maserati Grecale; Maserati Levante; Maserati Quattroporte (2013–2023); Morgan Plus Six; Porsche Panamera Diesel & Hybrid models only (2009–2016); Porsche Cayenne (2011–2018); Ram 1500 5.7 L HEMI V8 (2012–2019); Ram 1500 3.0 L EcoDiesel V6 (2013–2019); Rolls-Royce Phantom VII; Rolls-Royce Phantom VIII; Volkswagen Touareg (2018-); Volkswagen Amarok (2012–2020); Volkswagen Crafter SY/SZ (longitudinal engine only) (2017–)
8HP 90	900 N⋅m (664 lb⋅ft); 1,000 N⋅m (738 lb⋅ft)	Audi A8 (D4); Audi RS6 (C7); Bentley Mulsanne (2010); Bentley Continental GT 2nd gen. (2011–2018); BMW 760i/Li (F01/F02); Dodge Challenger SRT Hellcat 6.2 L HEMI V8 Supercharged; Dodge Charger SRT Hellcat 6.2 L HEMI V8 Supercharged; Porsche Cayenne (2011–2018) Turbo models and V8 Diesel only; Rolls-Royce Ghost; Bufori CS8; Rolls-Royce Wraith (2013); Volkswagen Touareg V8 TDI only (2018-)
2014: 2nd generation
8HP 50	500 N⋅m (369 lb⋅ft); 500 N⋅m (369 lb⋅ft)	Alfa Romeo Giulia; Alfa Romeo Stelvio; BMW 1 Series (F20) LCI; BMW X1 (E84); BMW 2 Series (F22) M240i; BMW 3 Series (F30) LCI; BMW 4 Series (F32) LCI; BMW 5 Series (F10//F11); BMW 5 Series (G30/G31); BMW 7 Series (G11/G12); BMW X3 20D (G01); BMW X3 30i (G01); BMW X3 M40i (G01); BMW X4 20D (G02); BMW X4 30i (G02); BMW X4 M40i (G02); BMW X7; Jaguar F-Pace (2016–); Jaguar XF (X260) (2016–2024); Jaguar XJ (2013–2019); Land Rover Defender (L663) (2019–); Land Rover Range Rover (L405) (2012–2022); Land Rover Range Rover (L460) (2022–); Maserati Grecale; Hongqi H9 V6 (2024–); CMC Zinger (2023–)
Torqueflite 850RE	500 N⋅m (369 lb⋅ft); 500 N⋅m (369 lb⋅ft)	Dodge Charger Pursuit V6 (2021–2023); Dodge Durango 3.6 L Pentastar V6 (2017–); Jeep Gladiator (JT) 3.6 L Pentastar V6 (2019–); Jeep Grand Cherokee (WK2) 3.6 L Pentastar V6 (2017–2021); Jeep Grand Cherokee WL & L 2.0 L I4 (2021–); Jeep Grand Cherokee WL & L 3.6 L Pentastar V6 (2021–); Jeep Wrangler/Unlimited (JL) 2.0 L I4 Hurricane Turbocharged (2017–); Jeep Wrangler/Unlimited (JL) 3.6 L Pentastar V6 (2017–); Ram 1500 (DT) 3.6 L Pentastar V6 (2019–)
8HP 75	700 N⋅m (516 lb⋅ft) 740 N⋅m (546 lb⋅ft)	Alfa Romeo Giulia Quadrifoglio; Alfa Romeo Stelvio Quadrifoglio; Alpina B5 (G30/G31); Alpina D5 (G30/G31); Alpina B6 (F12) Gran Coupé (2014); Alpina XD3; Alpina XB7; Aston Martin DB11; Aston Martin Vantage (2018) V8; BMW 5 Series (G30/G31); BMW M5 (F90); BMW 7 Series (G11/G12); BMW X3 30D (G01); BMW X5 (F15); BMW X5 M (F85); BMW X6 M (F86); BMW X7; Jaguar F-Pace (2016–); Jaguar XF (X260) (2016–2024); Jaguar XJ (2013–2019); Jeep Gladiator (JT) 3.0 L EcoDiesel V6 (2020–2023); Jeep Grand Cherokee (WK2) 3.0 L EcoDiesel V6 (2017–2021); Jeep Wagoneer/Grand Wagoneer (WS) (2021–); Jeep Wrangler 392 (2021–); Jeep Wrangler/Unlimited (JL) 6.4 L HEMI V8 (2021–); Jeep Wrangler/Unlimited (JL) 3.0 L EcoDiesel V6 (2020–2023); JMC Vigus; Land Rover Defender (L663) (2019–); Land Rover Discovery L462 (2017–); Land Rover Range Rover (L405) (2012–2022); Land Rover Range Rover (L460) (2022–); Ram 1500 (DT) 5.7 L HEMI V8 (2019–); Ram 1500 (DT) 3.0 L EcoDiesel V6 (2019–2023)
8HP 75-LCV	700 N⋅m (516 lb⋅ft) 740 N⋅m (546 lb⋅ft)	Ram 2500 6.4 L HEMI V8 (2018–); Ram 3500 6.4 L HEMI V8 (2018–)
8HP 95	900 N⋅m (664 lb⋅ft); 1,000 N⋅m (738 lb⋅ft)	Aston Martin DBS Superleggera; Audi S8; Audi RS6; Audi RS 7; Audi SQ7; Audi Q8; Audi RS Q8; Bentley Bentayga; Bentley Flying Spur (2013) 2014–2019; BMW M760i/Li; Dodge Durango SRT Hellcat 6.2 L HEMI V8 Supercharged; Jeep Grand Cherokee (WK2) SRT Trackhawk 6.2 L HEMI V8 Supercharged; Lamborghini Urus; Porsche Cayenne Turbo models only (2018-); Ram 1500 (DT) TRX 6.2 L HEMI V8 Supercharged (2021–2024, 2027–); Rolls-Royce Ghost Black Badge; Rolls-Royce Wraith (2013) Black Badge; Rolls-Royce Dawn Black Badge; Rolls-Royce Cullinan; Volkswagen Touareg V8 TDI only (2018-)
2018: 3rd generation
8HP 51	500 N⋅m (369 lb⋅ft); 500 N⋅m (369 lb⋅ft)	BMW 2 Series (G42); BMW 3 Series (G20); BMW 4 Series (G22); BMW Z4 (G29); BMW X3 M40i (G01); BMW X4 M40i (G02); Jaguar XE 20d RWD (2019–2024); Morgan Plus Four; Toyota GR Supra; Ineos Grenadier (petrol version)
8HP 76	760 N⋅m (561 lb⋅ft); 760 N⋅m (561 lb⋅ft)	Alpina B7 (G11/12); Alpina B8; BMW 3 Series (G20/G21) M340dX & 330d & 330dX; BMW 4 Series (G22/G23) M440dX & 430d & 430dX; BMW M3 (G80/G81); BMW M5 (F90); BMW M8 (F91/F92/F93); BMW 730d (G11/G12) LCI; BMW 8 Series (G15); BMW X5 (F95) M; BMW X7; Ineos Grenadier (diesel version)
2022: 4th generation
8HP 80	800 N⋅m (590 lb⋅ft); 800 N⋅m (590 lb⋅ft)	BMW 7 Series (G70/G73); BMW X5 (G05); BMW X5 M (F95); BMW X6 (G06); BMW X6 M (F96); BMW X7(G07 LCI); Alpina XB7 (G07); Hongqi Guoya
Torqueflite 880RE	800 N⋅m (590 lb⋅ft); 800 N⋅m (590 lb⋅ft)	Dodge Charger (2024) 3.0 L Hurricane twin-turbo I6
8HP 100	1,000 N⋅m (738 lb⋅ft); 1,000 N⋅m (738 lb⋅ft)	BMW XM (G09); BMW M5 (G90/G99)
1st–3rd generation
8HP 30	300 N⋅m (221 lb⋅ft); 300 N⋅m (221 lb⋅ft)	BMW 1 Series (F20) 116i; BMW X1 (E84)
Various
8HP TBD	TBD; TBD	AEBI MT750; Great Wall Pao (2019–); Great Wall Tank 300 (2020–); Haval H8 (2017–2018); Ineos Grenadier; VinFast LUX A2.0; VinFast LUX SA2.0

== See also ==
- List of Chrysler transmissions
- List of ZF transmissions
