= BMW X5 (F85) =

BMW X5 M (F85)
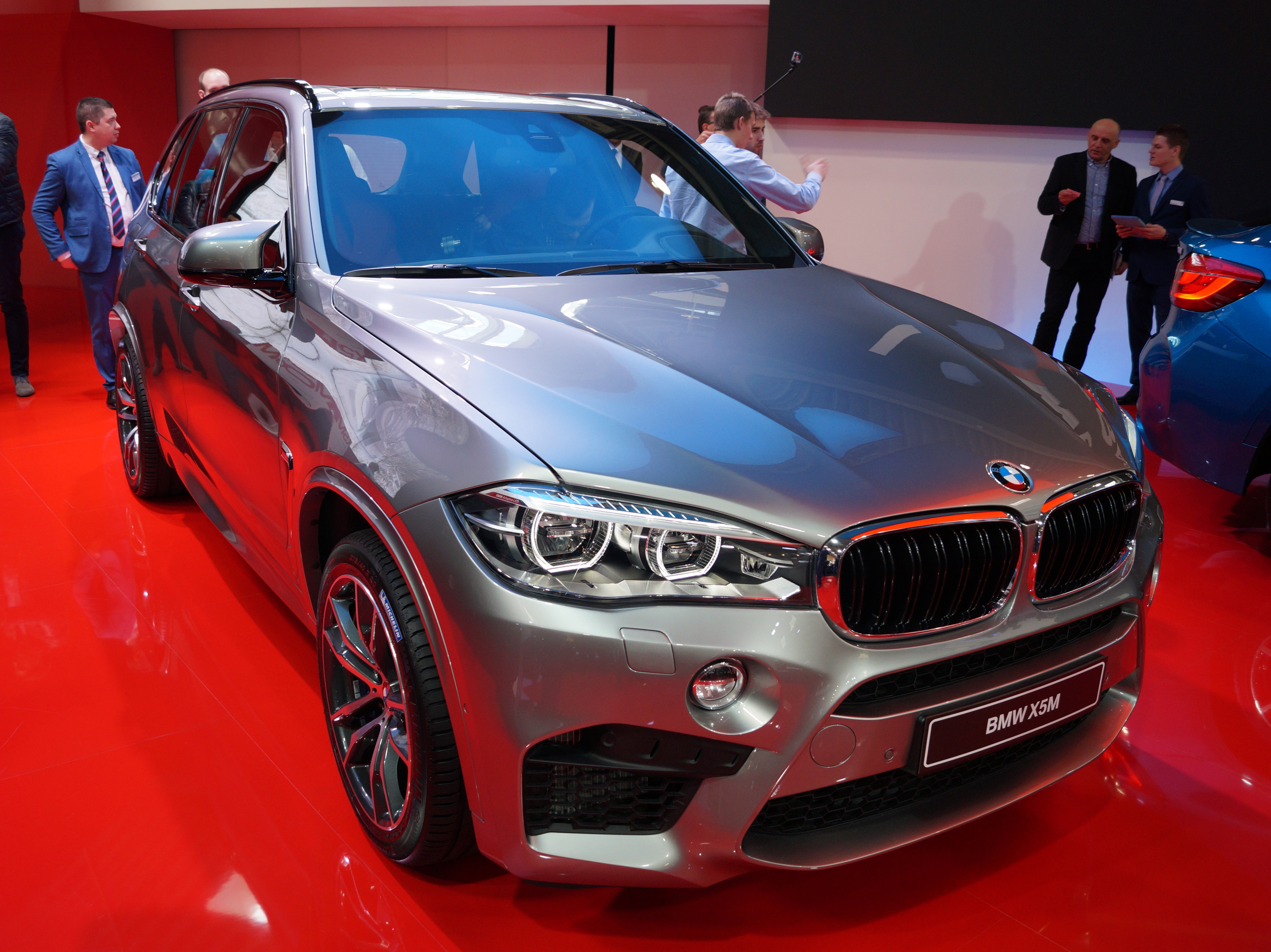

Overview
- Manufacturer: BMW
- Production: 2014–2018
- Model years: 2015–2018
- Assembly: Greer, South Carolina
- Designer: Mark Johnson (2010)

Body and chassis
- Class: Mid-size luxury SUV
- Body style: 5-door SUV
- Layout: F4 layout
- Related: BMW X6 M

Powertrain
- Engine: Petrol: 4.4L V8
- Transmission: 8-speed ZF 8HP automatic

Dimensions
- Wheelbase: 2,933 mm (115.5 in)
- Length: 4,886 mm (192.4 in)
- Width: 1,938 mm (76.3 in)
- Height: 1,762 mm (69.4 in)
- Curb weight: 2,105–2,350 kg (4,641–5,181 lb)

Chronology
- Predecessor: BMW X5 M 2010–2013
- Successor: 2020 BMW X5 M

The BMW X5 M (F85) is a mid-size luxury SUV that is based on the BMW X5 (F15) which has been built by BMW since 2014. Unlike the BMW X5 M50d the X5 M is a full BMW M series car that has the M Powered engine. In comparison, the M50d is classified as an "M Performance Car" which means it isn't a full M car unlike the BMW M3 or the BMW M5.

Its S63B44T2 4.4 liter V8 engine has 575 hp (429 kW) and 553 lb⋅ft (750 N⋅m) of torque, which made it the most powerful engine ever developed for an all-wheel drive BMW at the time. The engine has M TwinPower Turbo and Valvetronic technologies, to deliver a 0–100 km/h (62 mph) time of 4.2 seconds.

An M-tuned xDrive all-wheel drive system provides traction. It distributes drive between the front and rear axles, while Dynamic Performance Control distributes torque between the 21-inch M Double-spoke light-alloy wheels—all for dynamic driving and all-road capability.

== Successor ==
In June 2018, BMW announced the BMW X5 (G05) which is the successor to the BMW X5 (F15), the X5 M (F85) successor is named F95, it was expected to be G85 but interestingly BMW used F95.

== See also ==
- BMW
- BMW M
- BMW X5 (F15)
- BMW X5 (G05)
- BMW X6 (F16)
